= List of state highways in Louisiana (900–949) =

The following is a list of state highways in the U.S. state of Louisiana designated in the 900–949 range.

== Louisiana Highway 900 ==
Louisiana Highway 900
- Location: Clayton
- Length: 4.275 mi (6.880 km)
- Existed: 1955–present

Louisiana Highway 900 (LA 900) runs 4.28 miles (6.89 km) in a north–south direction from LA 568 northeast of Ferriday to US 65 in Clayton. The route's mileposts increase from the northern end contrary to common practice.

The entire highway is in Concordia Parish.

Location	mi	km	Destinations	Notes
	4.275	6.880	LA 568 (Lake Drive)	Southern terminus
Clayton	0.000	0.000	US 65 – Ferriday, Newellton	Northern terminus
1.000 mi = 1.609 km; 1.000 km = 0.621 mi

== Louisiana Highway 901 ==
Louisiana Highway 901
- Location: Concordia Parish
- Length: 3.9 mi (6.3 km)
- Existed: 1955–1976

Louisiana Highway 901 (LA 901) ran 3.9 miles (6.3 km) in a north–south direction from LA 569 south of Canebrake to a local road at L'Argent.

The entire highway was in Concordia Parish.

Location	mi	km	Destinations	Notes
	0.0	0.0	LA 569	Southern terminus
L'Argent	3.9	6.3	End state maintenance	Northern terminus
1.000 mi = 1.609 km; 1.000 km = 0.621 mi

== Louisiana Highway 902 ==
Louisiana Highway 902
- Location: Concordia Parish
- Length: 2.6 mi (4.2 km)
- Existed: 1955–c. 1957

Louisiana Highway 902 (LA 902) ran 2.6 miles (4.2 km) in a general southwest to northeast direction from a local road to LA 566 west of Clayton.

The entire route was in Concordia Parish.

mi	km	Destinations	Notes
0.0	0.0	Begin state maintenance	Southern terminus
2.6	4.2	LA 566	Northern terminus
1.000 mi = 1.609 km; 1.000 km = 0.621 mi

== Louisiana Highway 903 ==
Louisiana Highway 903
- Location: Ferriday
- Length: 1.478 mi (2.379 km)
- Existed: 1955–present

Louisiana Highway 903 (LA 903) runs 1.48 miles (2.38 km) in an east–west direction from the junction of two local roads west of Ferriday to a junction with the concurrent US 425/LA 15 in Ferriday. The route's mileposts increase from the eastern end contrary to common practice.

The entire highway is in Concordia Parish.

Location	mi	km	Destinations	Notes
	1.478	2.379	Begin state maintenance at junction of Doty Road and Country Store Road	Western terminus
Ferriday	0.000	0.000	US 425 / LA 15 (E.E. Wallace Boulevard) – Vidalia, Winnsboro	Eastern terminus
1.000 mi = 1.609 km; 1.000 km = 0.621 mi

== Louisiana Highway 904 ==
Louisiana Highway 904
- Location: Concordia Parish
- Length: 0.8 mi (1,300 m)
- Existed: 1955–c. 1957

Louisiana Highway 904 (LA 904) ran 0.8 miles (1.3 km) in a southeast to northwest direction from a dead end to a junction with US 84 west of Ferriday.

The entire route was in Concordia Parish.

mi	km	Destinations	Notes
0.0	0.0	Dead end	Southern terminus
0.8	1.3	US 84 – Ferriday, Jonesville	Northern terminus
1.000 mi = 1.609 km; 1.000 km = 0.621 mi

== Louisiana Highway 905 ==
Louisiana Highway 905
- Location: Concordia Parish
- Length: 3.3 mi (5.3 km)
- Existed: 1955–c. 1957

Louisiana Highway 905 (LA 905) ran 3.3 miles (5.3 km) in a north–south direction from LA 566 to a local road north of Elkhorn.

The entire route was in Concordia Parish.

mi	km	Destinations	Notes
0.0	0.0	LA 566	Southern terminus
3.3	5.3	End state maintenance	Northern terminus
1.000 mi = 1.609 km; 1.000 km = 0.621 mi

== Louisiana Highway 906 ==
Louisiana Highway 906
- Location: Concordia Parish
- Length: 2.402 mi (3.866 km)
- Existed: 1955–present

Louisiana Highway 906 (LA 906) runs 2.40 miles (3.86 km) in a general north–south direction from the concurrent LA 129/LA 565 in Monterey to a local road north of Monterey.

The entire highway is in Concordia Parish.

Location	mi	km	Destinations	Notes
Monterey	0.000	0.000	LA 129 / LA 565 – Monterey, Ferriday	Southern terminus
	2.402	3.866	End state maintenance on Island Road	Northern terminus
1.000 mi = 1.609 km; 1.000 km = 0.621 mi

== Louisiana Highway 907 ==
Louisiana Highway 907
- Location: Concordia Parish
- Length: 5.158 mi (8.301 km)
- Existed: 1955–present

Louisiana Highway 907 (LA 907) runs 5.16 miles (8.30 km) in a southeast to northwest direction from LA 129 to a local road west of Monterey.

The entire highway is in Concordia Parish.

Location	mi	km	Destinations	Notes
Eva	0.000	0.000	LA 129 – Monterey, New Era	Southern terminus
	1.661	2.673	LA 908 (Crouch Road)	Eastern terminus of LA 908
	4.167	6.706	LA 3203	Western terminus of LA 3203
	5.158	8.301	End state maintenance on Herbert Crouch Road	Northern terminus
1.000 mi = 1.609 km; 1.000 km = 0.621 mi

== Louisiana Highway 908 ==
Louisiana Highway 908
- Location: Concordia Parish
- Length: 3.444 mi (5.543 km)
- Existed: 1955–present

Louisiana Highway 908 (LA 908) runs 3.444 miles (5.543 km) in an east–west direction from a local road to LA 907 west of Monterey. The route's mileposts increase from the eastern end contrary to common practice.

The entire route is in Concordia Parish.

mi	km	Destinations	Notes
3.444	5.543	Begin state maintenance on Levee Road	Western terminus
0.000	0.000	LA 907	Eastern terminus
1.000 mi = 1.609 km; 1.000 km = 0.621 mi

== Louisiana Highway 909 ==
Louisiana Highway 909
- Location: Concordia Parish
- Length: 5.350 mi (8.610 km)
- Existed: 1955–present

Louisiana Highway 909 (LA 909) runs 5.35 miles (8.61 km) in a north–south direction from LA 129 north of Acme to a second junction with LA 129 in New Era.

The entire highway is in Concordia Parish.

Location	mi	km	Destinations	Notes
	0.000	0.000	LA 129 – Acme, New Era	Southern terminus
New Era	5.350	8.610	LA 129 – Acme, Monterey	Northern terminus
1.000 mi = 1.609 km; 1.000 km = 0.621 mi

== Louisiana Highway 910 ==
Louisiana Highway 910
- Location: Concordia Parish
- Length: 2.784 mi (4.480 km)
- Existed: 1955–present

Louisiana Highway 910 (LA 910) runs 2.78 miles (4.47 km) in an east–west direction along Dora Knapp Road from an intersection with Black Hawk-Levee Road west of Shaw to a junction with LA 15 at Shaw. The route's mileposts increase from the eastern end contrary to common practice.

The entire highway is in Concordia Parish.

Location	mi	km	Destinations	Notes
	2.784	4.480	Begin state maintenance at junction of Dora Knapp Road and Black Hawk-Acme Levee Road	Western terminus
Shaw	0.000	0.000	LA 15 – Vidalia	Eastern terminus
1.000 mi = 1.609 km; 1.000 km = 0.621 mi

== Louisiana Highway 911 ==
Louisiana Highway 911
- Location: Slocum–Deer Park
- Length: 16.4 mi (26.4 km)
- Existed: 1955–1961

Louisiana Highway 911 (LA 911) ran 16.4 miles (26.4 km) in a general north–south direction from LA 131 at Slocum to a second junction with LA 131 at Deer Park.

The entire highway was in Concordia Parish.

Location	mi	km	Destinations	Notes
Slocum	0.0	0.0	LA 131 – Shaw, Vidalia	Southern terminus
Deer Park	16.4	26.4	LA 131 – Vidalia, Shaw	Northern terminus
1.000 mi = 1.609 km; 1.000 km = 0.621 mi

== Louisiana Highway 912 ==
Louisiana Highway 912
- Location: St. James
- Length: 0.1 mi (160 m)
- Existed: 1955–1999

Louisiana Highway 912 (LA 912) ran 0.1 miles (0.16 km) in a southwest to northeast direction along Post Office Street from the Union Pacific Railroad tracks to a junction with LA 18 in St. James.

The entire highway was in St. James, St. James Parish.

mi	km	Destinations	Notes
0.0	0.0	Begin state maintenance at Union Pacific Railroad track	Southern terminus
0.1	0.16	LA 18 – Vacherie, Donaldsonville	Northern terminus
1.000 mi = 1.609 km; 1.000 km = 0.621 mi

== Louisiana Highway 913 ==
Louisiana Highway 913
- Location: Leland–Peck
- Length: 8.169 mi (13.147 km)
- Existed: 1955–present

Louisiana Highway 913 (LA 913) runs 8.17 miles (13.15 km) in a north–south direction from LA 8 in Leland to the concurrent US 425/LA 15 at Peck.

The entire highway is in Catahoula Parish.

Location	mi	km	Destinations	Notes
Leland	0.000	0.000	LA 8 – Sicily Island, Harrisonburg	Southern terminus
	1.330	2.140	LA 914	Western terminus of LA 914
	2.945	4.740	LA 915 west	South end of LA 915 concurrency
	2.987	4.807	LA 915 east	North end of LA 915 concurrency
	3.539	5.695	LA 916	Northern terminus of LA 916
Peck	8.157– 8.169	13.127– 13.147	US 425 / LA 15 – Sicily Island, Winnsboro	Northern terminus
1.000 mi = 1.609 km; 1.000 km = 0.621 mi: Concurrency terminus

== Louisiana Highway 914 ==
Louisiana Highway 914
- Location: Catahoula Parish
- Length: 1.883 mi (3.030 km)
- Existed: 1955–present

Louisiana Highway 914 (LA 914) runs 1.88 miles (3.03 km) in an east–west direction from LA 913 south of Norris Springs to LA 8 west of Sicily Island.

The entire route is in Catahoula Parish.

mi	km	Destinations	Notes
0.000	0.000	LA 913 – Leland, Norris Springs	Western terminus
1.883	3.030	LA 8 – Sicily Island, Harrisonburg	Eastern terminus
1.000 mi = 1.609 km; 1.000 km = 0.621 mi

== Louisiana Highway 915 ==
Louisiana Highway 915
- Location: Catahoula Parish
- Length: 2.657 mi (4.276 km)
- Existed: 1955–present

Louisiana Highway 915 (LA 915) runs 2.66 miles (4.28 km) in an east–west direction from a local road northwest of Norris Springs to a junction with LA 916 northeast of Norris Springs. The route's mileposts increase from the eastern end contrary to common practice.

The entire route is in Catahoula Parish.

mi	km	Destinations	Notes
2.657	4.276	Begin state maintenance on Bend Road	Western terminus
0.887	1.427	LA 913 south – Norris Springs, Leland	West end of LA 913 concurrency
0.847	1.363	LA 913 north – Peck	East end of LA 913 concurrency
0.000	0.000	LA 916	Eastern terminus
1.000 mi = 1.609 km; 1.000 km = 0.621 mi: Concurrency terminus

== Louisiana Highway 916 ==
Louisiana Highway 916
- Location: Catahoula Parish
- Length: 3.539 mi (5.695 km)
- Existed: 1955–present

Louisiana Highway 916 (LA 916) runs 3.54 miles (5.70 km) in a north–south direction from LA 8 west of Sicily Island to LA 913 north of Norris Springs.

The entire route is in Catahoula Parish.

mi	km	Destinations	Notes
0.000	0.000	LA 8 – Sicily Island, Harrisonburg	Southern terminus
2.549	4.102	LA 915	Eastern terminus of LA 915
3.539	5.695	LA 913 – Norris Springs, Peck	Northern terminus
1.000 mi = 1.609 km; 1.000 km = 0.621 mi

== Louisiana Highway 917 ==
Louisiana Highway 917
- Location: Catahoula Parish
- Length: 0.6 mi (970 m)
- Existed: 1955–1978

Louisiana Highway 917 (LA 917) ran 0.6 miles (0.97 km) in an east–west direction from the junction of LA 913 and LA 916 to a local road northwest of Sicily Island.

The entire route was in Catahoula Parish.

mi	km	Destinations	Notes
0.0	0.0	LA 913 / LA 916	Western terminus
0.6	0.97	End state maintenance	Eastern terminus
1.000 mi = 1.609 km; 1.000 km = 0.621 mi

== Louisiana Highway 918 ==
Louisiana Highway 918
- Location: Catahoula Parish
- Length: 1.2 mi (1.9 km)
- Existed: 1955–c. 1957

Louisiana Highway 918 (LA 918) ran 1.2 miles (1.9 km) in an east–west direction from LA 15 to a local road north of Sicily Island.

The entire route was in Catahoula Parish.

mi	km	Destinations	Notes
0.0	0.0	LA 15 – Sicily Island, Winnsboro	Western terminus
1.2	1.9	End state maintenance at local road	Eastern terminus
1.000 mi = 1.609 km; 1.000 km = 0.621 mi

== Louisiana Highway 919 ==
Louisiana Highway 919
- Location: Catahoula Parish
- Length: 1.0 mi (1.6 km)
- Existed: 1955–1978

Louisiana Highway 919 (LA 919) ran 1.0 mile (1.6 km) in an east–west direction from a dead end to a junction with LA 15 north of Sicily Island.

The entire route was in Catahoula Parish.

mi	km	Destinations	Notes
0.0	0.0	Dead end	Western terminus
1.0	1.6	LA 15 – Sicily Island, Winnsboro	Eastern terminus
1.000 mi = 1.609 km; 1.000 km = 0.621 mi

== Louisiana Highway 920 ==
Louisiana Highway 920
- Location: Catahoula Parish
- Length: 1.3 mi (2.1 km)
- Existed: 1955–1973

Louisiana Highway 920 (LA 920) ran 1.3 miles (2.1 km) in a north–south direction from LA 15 in Foules to a dead end north of Foules.

The entire highway was in Catahoula Parish.

Location	mi	km	Destinations	Notes
Foules	0.0	0.0	LA 15 – Sicily Island, Clayton	Southern terminus
	1.3	2.1	Dead end	Northern terminus
1.000 mi = 1.609 km; 1.000 km = 0.621 mi

== Louisiana Highway 921 ==
Louisiana Highway 921
- Location: Catahoula Parish
- Length: 13.034 mi (20.976 km)
- Existed: 1955–present

Louisiana Highway 921 (LA 921) runs 13.03 miles (20.97 km) in a general north–south direction from a local road southwest of Maitland to a local road north of Foules.

The entire highway is in Catahoula Parish.

Location	mi	km	Destinations	Notes
	0.000	0.000	Begin state maintenance on Tensas Road	Southern terminus
Maitland	3.682	5.926	LA 567	Western terminus of LA 567
Foules	8.939– 8.960	14.386– 14.420	US 425 / LA 15 – Sicily Island, Ferriday	
	13.034	20.976	End state maintenance on Crawford Road	Northern terminus
1.000 mi = 1.609 km; 1.000 km = 0.621 mi

== Louisiana Highway 922 ==
Louisiana Highway 922
- Location: Harrisonburg
- Length: 2.041 mi (3.285 km)
- Existed: 1955–present

Louisiana Highway 922 (LA 922) runs 2.04 miles (3.28 km) in a northwest to southeast direction from a local road in Harrisonburg to another local road east of Harrisonburg.

The entire highway is in Catahoula Parish.

Location	mi	km	Destinations	Notes
Harrisonburg	0.000	0.000	Begin state maintenance	Western terminus
	0.285	0.459	LA 8 – Harrisonburg, Sicily Island	
	2.041	3.285	End state maintenance	Eastern terminus
1.000 mi = 1.609 km; 1.000 km = 0.621 mi

== Louisiana Highway 923 ==
Louisiana Highway 923
- Location: Catahoula Parish
- Length: 10.318 mi (16.605 km)
- Existed: 1955–present

Louisiana Highway 923 (LA 923) runs 10.32 miles (16.61 km) in a general north–south direction from a local road west of Jonesville to a junction with LA 124 at Wallace Ridge.

The entire highway is in Catahoula Parish.

Location	mi	km	Destinations	Notes
	0.000	0.000	Little River Road	Southern terminus
	3.209	5.164	LA 3101	Western terminus of LA 3101
	5.244	8.439	LA 126 west – Manifest	South end of LA 126 concurrency
	5.804	9.341	LA 126 east – Jonesville	North end of LA 126 concurrency
Wallace Ridge	10.318	16.605	LA 124 – Jonesville, Harrisonburg	Northern terminus
1.000 mi = 1.609 km; 1.000 km = 0.621 mi: Concurrency terminus

== Louisiana Highway 924 ==
Louisiana Highway 924
- Location: Catahoula Parish
- Length: 1.4 mi (2.3 km)
- Existed: 1955–c. 1957

Louisiana Highway 924 (LA 924) ran 1.4 miles (2.3 km) in an east–west direction from LA 124 south of Wallace Ridge to a local road at Quaid.

The entire highway was in Catahoula Parish.

Location	mi	km	Destinations	Notes
	0.0	0.0	LA 124 – Jonesville, Harrisonburg	Western terminus
Quaid	1.4	2.3	End state maintenance	Eastern terminus
1.000 mi = 1.609 km; 1.000 km = 0.621 mi

== Louisiana Highway 925 ==
Louisiana Highway 925
- Location: Catahoula Parish
- Length: 4.7 mi (7.6 km)
- Existed: 1955–1965

Louisiana Highway 925 (LA 925) ran 4.7 miles (7.6 km) in a general north–south direction, looping off of LA 124 south of Jonesville.

The entire highway was in Catahoula Parish.

Location	mi	km	Destinations	Notes
	0.0	0.0	LA 124 – Jonesville, Mayna	Southern terminus
Mayo Landing	4.7	7.6	LA 124 – Jonesville, Mayna	Northern terminus
1.000 mi = 1.609 km; 1.000 km = 0.621 mi

== Louisiana Highway 926 ==
Louisiana Highway 926
- Location: Catahoula Parish
- Length: 2.2 mi (3.5 km)
- Existed: 1955–1965

Louisiana Highway 926 (LA 926) ran 2.2 miles (3.5 km) in an east–west direction from a local road to a junction with LA 564 south of Jonesville.

The entire route was in Catahoula Parish.

mi	km	Destinations	Notes
0.0	0.0	Begin state maintenance	Western terminus
2.2	3.5	LA 564	Eastern terminus
1.000 mi = 1.609 km; 1.000 km = 0.621 mi

== Louisiana Highway 927 ==
Louisiana Highway 927
- Location: Jonesville
- Length: 1.111 mi (1.788 km)
- Existed: 1955–present

Louisiana Highway 927 (LA 927) runs 1.11 miles (1.79 km) in a general southeast to northwest direction from US 84 to LA 124 in Jonesville.

The entire highway is in Jonesville, Catahoula Parish.

mi	km	Destinations	Notes
0.000	0.000	US 84 (4th Street)	Southeastern terminus
1.067– 1.111	1.717– 1.788	LA 124 – Harrisonburg	Northwestern terminus
1.000 mi = 1.609 km; 1.000 km = 0.621 mi

As designated in the 1955 Louisiana Highway renumbering, LA 927 originally comprised 13 different road segments in Jonesville. By 1958, however, 11 of the hypenated routes were eliminated. The remaining two (LA 927-1 and LA 927-13) were renumbered as one continuous un-hyphenated route.

- LA 927-1 ran 0.8 miles (1.3 km) along 1st Street from US 84 to Mound Street.
- LA 927-2 ran 0.3 miles (0.48 km) along Little River Road from Main Street to Front Street.
- LA 927-3 ran 0.1 miles (0.16 km) along 2nd Street from Mound Street to Front Street.
- LA 927-4 ran 0.1 miles (0.16 km) along Front Street from 1st Street to Little River Road.
- LA 927-5 ran 0.2 miles (0.32 km) along 3rd Street from Division Street to Mound Street.
- LA 927-6 ran 0.2 miles (0.32 km) along 9th Street from Willow Street to Front Street.
- LA 927-7 ran 0.1 miles (0.16 km) along 9th Street from Division Street to Willow Street.
- LA 927-8 ran 0.2 miles (0.32 km) along 10th Street from Main Street to Mound Street.
- LA 927-9 ran 0.7 miles (1.1 km) along Main Street from 10th Street to Little River Road.
- LA 927-10 ran 0.3 miles (0.48 km) along Division Street from 4th Street to Little River Road.
- LA 927-11 ran 0.7 miles (1.1 km) along Willow Street from 10th Street to Little River Road.
- LA 927-12 ran 0.3 miles (0.48 km) along Pond Street from 4th Street to Little River Road.
- LA 927-13 ran 0.2 miles (0.32 km) along Mound Street from 4th Street to 1st Street.

== Louisiana Highway 928 ==
Louisiana Highway 928
- Location: Ascension Parish
- Length: 5.689 mi (9.156 km)
- Existed: 1955–present

Louisiana Highway 928 (LA 928) runs 5.69 miles (9.16 km) in a north–south direction along Bluff Road from LA 74 west of Dutchtown to LA 427 northwest of Prairieville.

Near its northern terminus, LA 928 passes over without connecting to I-10. It is an undivided two-lane highway for its entire length.

The entire route is in Ascension Parish.

mi	km	Destinations	Notes
0.000	0.000	LA 74 – Dutchtown, St. Gabriel	Southern terminus
5.689	9.156	LA 427 (Perkins Road)	Northern terminus
1.000 mi = 1.609 km; 1.000 km = 0.621 mi

== Louisiana Highway 929 ==
Louisiana Highway 929
- Location: Prairieville–Hobart
- Length: 3.5 mi (5.6 km)
- Existed: 1955–1990

Louisiana Highway 929 (LA 929) ran 3.5 miles (5.6 km) in a general southwest to northeast direction from US 61 in Prairieville to LA 42 at Hobart.

The entire highway was in Ascension Parish.

Location	mi	km	Destinations	Notes
Prairieville	0.0	0.0	US 61 (Airline Highway) – Baton Rouge, New Orleans	Southwestern terminus
	1.0	1.6	LA 930	Southern terminus of LA 930
Hobart	3.5	5.6	LA 42 – Oak Grove, Port Vincent	Northeastern terminus
1.000 mi = 1.609 km; 1.000 km = 0.621 mi

== Louisiana Highway 930 ==
Louisiana Highway 930
- Location: Ascension Parish
- Length: 1.752 mi (2.820 km)
- Existed: 1955–2019

Louisiana Highway 930 (LA 930) ran 1.75 miles (2.82 km) in a north–south direction from the junction of two local roads east of Prairieville to LA 42 west of Hobart.

The route was transferred to local control in 2019 as part of La DOTD's Road Transfer Program.

The entire route was in Ascension Parish.

mi	km	Destinations	Notes
0.000	0.000	Begin state maintenance at junction of Ascension Parish Highway 929 and Daigle Road	Southern terminus
1.752	2.820	LA 42 – Oak Grove, Port Vincent	Northern terminus
1.000 mi = 1.609 km; 1.000 km = 0.621 mi

== Louisiana Highway 931 ==
Louisiana Highway 931
- Location: Ascension Parish
- Length: 5.295 mi (8.521 km)
- Existed: 1955–present

Louisiana Highway 931 (LA 931) runs 5.30 miles (8.53 km) in a general southwest to northeast direction from LA 44 north of Gonzales to LA 431 south of Port Vincent.

The entire route is in Ascension Parish.

mi	km	Destinations	Notes
0.000	0.000	LA 44 – Gonzales	Western terminus
3.032	4.880	LA 431	
5.295	8.521	LA 431	Eastern terminus
1.000 mi = 1.609 km; 1.000 km = 0.621 mi

== Louisiana Highway 932 ==
Louisiana Highway 932
- Location: Ascension Parish
- Length: 2.2 mi (3.5 km)
- Existed: 1955–2000s

Louisiana Highway 932 (LA 932) ran 2.2 miles (3.5 km) in a north–south direction from LA 931 to a local road north of Gonzales.

It was an undivided two-lane highway for its entire length.

The entire route was in Ascension Parish.

mi	km	Destinations	Notes
0.0	0.0	LA 931	Southern terminus
2.1	3.4	LA 933	
2.2	3.5	End state maintenance on Joe Sevario Road	Northern terminus
1.000 mi = 1.609 km; 1.000 km = 0.621 mi

== Louisiana Highway 933 ==
Louisiana Highway 933
- Location: Ascension Parish
- Length: 4.475 mi (7.202 km)
- Existed: 1955–present

Louisiana Highway 933 (LA 933) runs 4.48 miles (7.21 km) in a general southwest to northeast direction from LA 44 north of Gonzales to LA 42 west of Port Vincent.

The entire route is in Ascension Parish.

mi	km	Destinations	Notes
0.000	0.000	LA 44 – Gonzales	Western terminus
4.475	7.202	LA 42 – Port Vincent, Oak Grove	Eastern terminus
1.000 mi = 1.609 km; 1.000 km = 0.621 mi

== Louisiana Highway 934 ==
Louisiana Highway 934
- Location: Ascension Parish
- Length: 5.544 mi (8.922 km)
- Existed: 1955–present

Louisiana Highway 934 (LA 934) runs 5.54 miles (8.92 km) in an east–west direction from LA 44 north of Gonzales to the junction of two local roads northeast of Gonzales. As of 2019, the portion east of LA 431 is under agreement to be removed from the state highway system and transferred to local control.

The entire route is in Ascension Parish.

mi	km	Destinations	Notes
0.000	0.000	LA 44 – Gonzales	Western terminus
3.034	4.883	LA 431 north	West end of LA 431 concurrency
3.534	5.687	LA 431 south	East end of LA 431 concurrency
5.544	8.922	End state maintenance at junction of Gold Place Road and Gaudin Drive	Eastern terminus
1.000 mi = 1.609 km; 1.000 km = 0.621 mi: Concurrency terminus

== Louisiana Highway 935 ==
Louisiana Highway 935
- Location: Ascension Parish
- Length: 7.574 mi (12.189 km)
- Existed: 1955–present

Louisiana Highway 935 (LA 935) runs 7.57 miles (12.18 km) in a general east–west direction from LA 44 in Gonzales to LA 22 north of Sorrento.

The entire highway is in Ascension Parish.

Location	mi	km	Destinations	Notes
Gonzales	0.000	0.000	LA 44 (North Burnside Avenue)	Western terminus
Duck Roost	3.034	4.883	LA 431 north – Port Vincent, Denham Springs	West end of LA 431 concurrency
	3.544	5.704	LA 431 south – Brittany	East end of LA 431 concurrency
	7.574	12.189	LA 22 – Sorrento, Springfield	Eastern terminus
1.000 mi = 1.609 km; 1.000 km = 0.621 mi: Concurrency terminus

== Louisiana Highway 936 ==
Louisiana Highway 936
- Location: Ascension Parish
- Length: 3.777 mi (6.078 km)
- Existed: 1955–present

Louisiana Highway 936 (LA 936) runs 3.78 miles (6.08 km) in a general southwest to northeast direction from LA 22 north of Sorrento to a second junction with LA 22 at Acy.

The route initially heads southeast from LA 22 toward the New River. It then turns north along the west bank of the river and intersects LA 937 before ending at a second junction with LA 22 at Acy. LA 936 is an undivided two-lane highway for its entire length.

The entire highway is in Ascension Parish.

Location	mi	km	Destinations	Notes
	0.000	0.000	LA 22 – Sorrento, St. Amant	Southwestern terminus
	3.266	5.256	LA 937	Western terminus of LA 937
Acy	3.777	6.078	LA 22 – Sorrento, Springfield	Northeastern terminus
1.000 mi = 1.609 km; 1.000 km = 0.621 mi

== Louisiana Highway 937 ==
Louisiana Highway 937
- Location: Ascension Parish
- Length: 1.745 mi (2.808 km)
- Existed: 1955–present

Louisiana Highway 937 (LA 937) runs 1.75 miles (2.82 km) in a general southwest to northeast direction from LA 936 south of Acy to LA 22 east of Acy.

It is an undivided two-lane highway for its entire length.

The entire route is in Ascension Parish.

mi	km	Destinations	Notes
0.000	0.000	LA 936	Western terminus
1.745	2.808	LA 22 – Sorrento, Springfield	Eastern terminus
1.000 mi = 1.609 km; 1.000 km = 0.621 mi

== Louisiana Highway 938 ==
Louisiana Highway 938
- Location: Gonzales
- Length: 2.285 mi (3.677 km)
- Existed: 1955–present

Louisiana Highway 938 (LA 938) runs 2.29 miles (3.69 km) in a northwest to southeast direction from LA 74 north of Gonzales to LA 44 in Gonzales.

The route initially heads south from LA 74. It then follows a serpentine path east along Coontrap Road, south along West New River Street, and east across the New River to its terminus at LA 44 (North Burnside Avenue) in Gonzales. LA 938 is an undivided two-lane highway for its entire length.

The entire highway is in Ascension Parish.

Location	mi	km	Destinations	Notes
	0.000	0.000	LA 74 – Dutchtown, St. Gabriel	Western terminus
Gonzales	2.285	3.677	LA 44 (North Burnside Avenue)	Eastern terminus
1.000 mi = 1.609 km; 1.000 km = 0.621 mi

== Louisiana Highway 939 ==
Louisiana Highway 939
- Location: Gonzales
- Length: 1.214 mi (1.954 km)
- Existed: 1955–present

Louisiana Highway 939 (LA 939) runs 1.21 miles (1.95 km) in an east–west direction from LA 44 to US 61 in Gonzales.

The route heads east on East Worthy Road from LA 44 (South Burnside Avenue). It then turns north onto Roddy Road and proceeds to a junction with US 61 (Airline Highway) shortly afterward. LA 939 is an undivided two-lane highway for its entire length.

The entire highway is in Gonzales, Ascension Parish.

mi	km	Destinations	Notes
0.000	0.000	LA 44 (South Burnside Avenue)	Western terminus
1.201– 1.214	1.933– 1.954	US 61 (Airline Highway) – Baton Rouge, New Orleans	Eastern terminus
1.000 mi = 1.609 km; 1.000 km = 0.621 mi

== Louisiana Highway 940 ==
Louisiana Highway 940
- Location: Gonzales
- Length: 0.999 mi (1,608 m)
- Existed: 1955–present

Louisiana Highway 940 (LA 940) runs 1.00 mile (1.61 km) in an east–west direction along West Orice Roth Road from South Darla Avenue to LA 44 in Gonzales. The route's mileposts increase from the eastern end contrary to common practice.

It is an undivided two-lane highway for its entire length.

The entire highway is in Gonzales, Ascension Parish.

mi	km	Destinations	Notes
0.999	1.608	Begin state maintenance at junction of West Orice Roth Road and South Darla Avenue	Western terminus
0.000	0.000	LA 44 (South Burnside Avenue)	Eastern terminus
1.000 mi = 1.609 km; 1.000 km = 0.621 mi

== Louisiana Highway 941 ==
Louisiana Highway 941
- Location: Ascension Parish
- Length: 4.317 mi (6.948 km)
- Existed: 1955–present

Louisiana Highway 941 (LA 941) runs 4.32 miles (6.95 km) in a general southwest to northeast direction from LA 44 south of Gonzales to LA 30 east of Gonzales. The route's mileposts increase from the northern or eastern end contrary to common practice.

It is an undivided two-lane highway for its entire length.

The entire route is in Ascension Parish.

mi	km	Destinations	Notes
4.317	6.948	LA 44 – Gonzales, Burnside	Southwestern terminus
0.000	0.000	LA 30 – Brittany, Gonzales	Northeastern terminus
1.000 mi = 1.609 km; 1.000 km = 0.621 mi

== Louisiana Highway 942 ==
Louisiana Highway 942
- Location: Darrow–Burnside
- Length: 5.101 mi (8.209 km)
- Existed: 1955–present

Louisiana Highway 942 (LA 942) runs 5.10 miles (8.21 km) in a general east–west direction from the junction of LA 22 and LA 75 in Darrow to LA 44 in Burnside.

The route follows the east bank levee of the Mississippi River between Darrow and Burnside. It is an undivided two-lane highway for its entire length.

LA 942 carries what was once a small piece of the Jefferson Highway auto trail, designated in 1916. It was also designated as State Route 1 from 1921 until the 1955 Louisiana Highway renumbering. US 61 followed the route from 1926 until 1933 when the Airline Highway was opened between Baton Rouge and the Bonnet Carré Spillway.

The entire highway is in Ascension Parish.

Location	mi	km	Destinations	Notes
Darrow	0.000	0.000	LA 22 east – Sorrento LA 75 north – St. Gabriel	Western terminus
Burnside	5.101	8.209	LA 44 – Gonzales, Convent	Eastern terminus
1.000 mi = 1.609 km; 1.000 km = 0.621 mi

== Louisiana Highway 943 ==
Louisiana Highway 943
- Location: Ascension Parish
- Length: 7.817 mi (12.580 km)
- Existed: 1955–present

Louisiana Highway 943 (LA 943) runs 7.82 miles (12.59 km) in a general north–south direction from LA 308 southwest of Donaldsonville to LA 1 west of Donaldsonville.

The route heads west from LA 308 and immediately crosses both Bayou Lafourche and LA 1. After about three miles (4.8 km), the highway turns due north for about one mile (1.6 km). It then turns to follow a northeast course to a second junction with LA 1 at McCall. LA 943 is an undivided two-lane highway for its entire length.

The entire highway is in Ascension Parish.

Location	mi	km	Destinations	Notes
	0.000	0.000	LA 308	Southern terminus
	0.034– 0.076	0.055– 0.122	Bridge over Bayou Lafourche	
	0.086	0.138	LA 1 – Donaldsonville, Napoleonville	
McCall	7.817	12.580	LA 1 – Donaldsonville, Plaquemine	Northern terminus
1.000 mi = 1.609 km; 1.000 km = 0.621 mi

== Louisiana Highway 944 ==
Louisiana Highway 944
- Location: Ascension Parish
- Length: 2.560 mi (4.120 km)
- Existed: 1955–2025

Louisiana Highway 944 (LA 944) ran 2.56 miles (4.12 km) in a general north–south direction from LA 1 to LA 943 west of Donaldsonville.

The route initially headed west from LA 1 as paved two-lane highway through an area known as Palo Alto. It turned north onto the unpaved Palo Alto Road then northwest onto a second unpaved road to its terminus at LA 943 near McCall.

The route was transferred to local control in 2025 as part of La DOTD's Road Transfer Program.

The entire route was in Ascension Parish.

Parish	mi	km	Destinations	Notes
0.000	0.000	LA 1 – Donaldsonville, Napoleonville	Southern terminus	
2.560	4.120	LA 943	Northern terminus	
1.000 mi = 1.609 km; 1.000 km = 0.621 mi

== Louisiana Highway 945 ==
Louisiana Highway 945
- Location: Donaldsonville
- Length: 1.463 mi (2.354 km)
- Existed: 1955–present

Louisiana Highway 945 (LA 945) runs 1.46 miles (2.35 km) in a general east–west direction from LA 308 to LA 3089 in Donaldsonville.

The V-shaped route heads southeast on Vatican Drive from LA 308, which follows alongside Bayou Lafourche. It then turns northeast onto St. Patrick Street and dips underneath the Union Pacific Railroad tracks to its terminus at LA 3089 (Marchand Drive).

The entire highway is in Donaldsonville, Ascension Parish.

mi	km	Destinations	Notes
0.000	0.000	LA 308 (Lafourche Street)	Western terminus
1.463	2.354	LA 3089 (Marchand Drive)	Eastern terminus
1.000 mi = 1.609 km; 1.000 km = 0.621 mi

As designated in the 1955 Louisiana Highway renumbering, LA 945 originally comprised three different road segments in and near Donaldsonville. By 1958, however, the three hypenated routes were renumbered as one continuous un-hyphenated route with the addition of some local road mileage.

- LA 945-1 consisted of the St. Patrick Street railroad underpass.
- LA 945-2 ran 0.5 miles (0.80 km) along St. Patrick Street from 4th Street to what is now Vatican Drive.
- LA 945-3 ran 0.6 miles (0.97 km) along what is now Vatican Drive from St. Patrick Street to LA 308.

== Louisiana Highway 946 ==
Louisiana Highway 946
- Location: Baton Rouge–Central
- Length: 5.211 mi (8.386 km)
- Existed: 1955–present

Louisiana Highway 946 (LA 946) runs 5.21 miles (8.38 km) in a north–south direction along Joor Road from LA 37 in Baton Rouge to LA 408 in Central.

It is an undivided four-lane highway with a center turn lane for its entire length. As of 2018, a portion of LA 946 is under agreement to be removed from the state highway system and transferred to local control.

The entire highway is in East Baton Rouge Parish.

Location	mi	km	Destinations	Notes
Baton Rouge	0.000	0.000	LA 37 (Greenwell Springs Road)	Southern terminus
Central	2.210– 2.483	3.557– 3.996	Bridge over Comite River	
Central	5.211	8.386	LA 408 (Hooper Road)	Northern terminus
1.000 mi = 1.609 km; 1.000 km = 0.621 mi

== Louisiana Highway 947 ==
Louisiana Highway 947
- Location: East Baton Rouge Parish
- Length: 2.0 mi (3.2 km)
- Existed: 1955–c. 1957

Louisiana Highway 947 (LA 947) ran 2.0 miles (3.2 km) in a north–south direction along what is now North Sherwood Forest Drive from US 190 to LA 37 east of Baton Rouge.

The entire highway was in East Baton Rouge Parish.

Location	mi	km	Destinations	Notes
	0.0	0.0	US 190 (Florida Boulevard) – Baton Rouge, Hammond	Southern terminus
Sharp	0.9	1.4	End state maintenance at Illinois Central Railroad crossing	
Gap in LA 947; federal government-owned road continued for 0.4 miles (0.64 km) through U.S. Engineer Depot
	0.9	1.4	Resume state maintenance at north side of U.S. Engineer Depot	
	2.0	3.2	LA 37 (Greenwell Springs Road) – Baton Rouge, Greenwell Springs	Northern terminus
1.000 mi = 1.609 km; 1.000 km = 0.621 mi

== Louisiana Highway 948 ==
Louisiana Highway 948
- Location: East Baton Rouge Parish
- Length: 0.350 mi (563 m)
- Existed: 1955–present

Louisiana Highway 948 (LA 948) runs 0.35 miles (0.56 km) in an east–west direction along Highland Road from the junction of US 61 and LA 42 to a junction with LA 73 southeast of Baton Rouge. The route's mileposts increase from the eastern end contrary to common practice.

It is an undivided two-lane highway for its entire length.

The entire route is in East Baton Rouge Parish.

mi	km	Destinations	Notes
0.350	0.563	US 61 / LA 42 east (Airline Highway) – Baton Rouge, New Orleans LA 42 west (Highland Road)	Western terminus
0.000	0.000	LA 73 (Jefferson Highway)	Eastern terminus
1.000 mi = 1.609 km; 1.000 km = 0.621 mi

== Louisiana Highway 949 ==
Louisiana Highway 949
- Location: East Baton Rouge Parish
- Length: 0.9 mi (1,400 m)
- Existed: 1955–1960

Louisiana Highway 949 (LA 949) ran 0.9 miles (1.4 km) in an east–west direction along what is now Hyacinth Avenue from LA 425 to LA 427 south of Baton Rouge.

The entire route was in East Baton Rouge Parish.

mi	km	Destinations	Notes
0.0	0.0	LA 425 (Staring Lane)	Western terminus
0.9	1.4	LA 427 (Perkins Road)	Eastern terminus
1.000 mi = 1.609 km; 1.000 km = 0.621 mi
