= Natchez micropolitan area =

Natchez, MS–LA Area
- Micropolitan Statistical Area
- Natchez, MS–LA Micropolitan Statistical Area
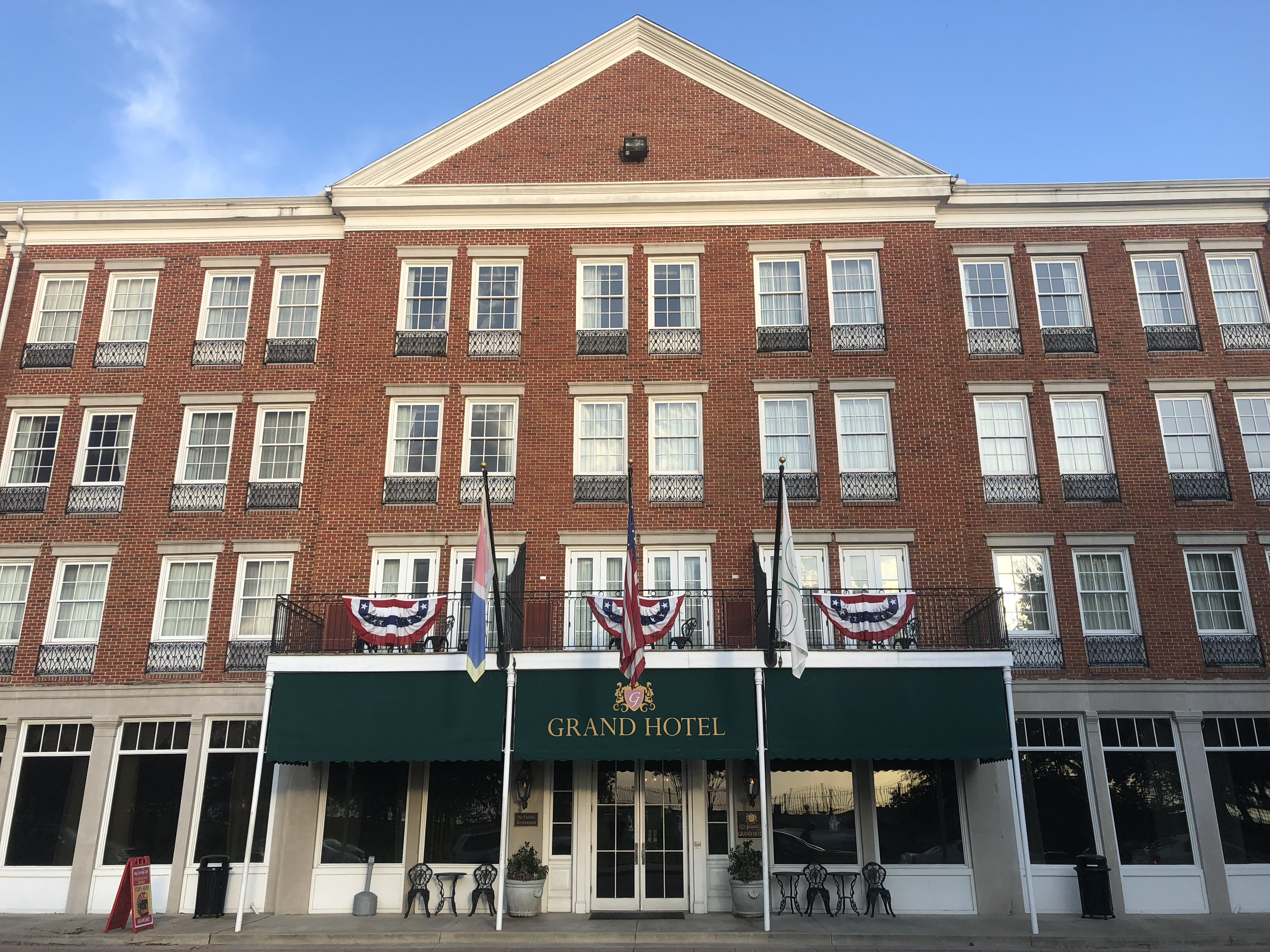
- Natchez Grand Hotel
Interactive Map of Natchez, MS–LA CSA
City of Natchez
City of Vidalia
Natchez, LA µSA
- Country: United States
- State: Mississippi; Louisiana
- Principal city: Natchez
- Other cities: Fayette, MS; Vidalia, LA; Ferriday, LA; Clayton, LA; Ridgecrest, LA
- Time zone: UTC-6 (CST)
  - Summer (DST): UTC-5 (CDT)

The Natchez Micropolitan Statistical Area is a micropolitan area that consists of Adams County, Mississippi and Concordia Parish, Louisiana. As of the 2000 census, it had a population of 54,587 (though a July 1, 2009 estimate placed the population at 49,711).

== Counties ==
- Adams County, Mississippi
- Jefferson County, Mississippi
- Concordia Parish, Louisiana

== Communities ==
=== Incorporated places ===
- Clayton, Louisiana
- Fayette, Mississippi
- Ferriday, Louisiana
- Natchez, Mississippi (Principal City)
- Ridgecrest, Louisiana
- Vidalia, Louisiana

=== Census-designated places ===
- Minorca, Louisiana
- Monterey, Louisiana
- Spokane, Louisiana
- West Ferriday, Louisiana

=== Unincorporated places ===
- Acme, Louisiana
- Cannonsburg, Mississippi
- Eva, Louisiana
- Frogmore, Louisiana
- Morgantown, Mississippi
- New Era, Louisiana
- Pine Ridge, Mississippi
- Shaw, Louisiana
- Sibley, Mississippi
- Stanton, Mississippi
- Washington, Mississippi
- Wildsville, Louisiana

== Demographics ==
As of the census of 2000, there were 54,587 people, 21,198 households, and 14,839 families residing within the μSA. The racial makeup of the μSA was 51.49% White, 47.18% African American, 0.15% Native American, 0.24% Asian, 0.01% Pacific Islander, 0.34% from other races, and 0.59% from two or more races. Hispanic or Latino of any race were 1.05% of the population.

The median income for a household in the μSA was $23,988, and the median income for a family was $29,110. Males had a median income of $28,857 versus $19,531 for females. The per capita income for the μSA was $13,872.

== See also ==
- List of cities in Mississippi
- List of towns and villages in Mississippi
- List of census-designated places in Mississippi
- Louisiana census statistical areas
- List of cities, towns, and villages in Louisiana
- List of census-designated places in Louisiana
- List of United States metropolitan areas
