= Louisiana Highway 425 =

State highway in Louisiana, United States

Louisiana Highway 425
- LA 425 highlighted in red on a modern map

Route information
- Maintained by Louisiana DOTD
- Length: 2.02 mi (3.25 km)
- Existed: 1955–1960

Major junctions
- South end: LA 30 (Highland Road) to LA 42
- LA 949 (Hyacinth Avenue)
- North end: LA 427 (Perkins Road)

Location
- Country: United States
- State: Louisiana

Highway system
- Louisiana State Highway System; Interstate; US; State; Scenic
← LA 424	→ LA 426

Louisiana Highway 425 (LA 425) was a state highway in Louisiana that served East Baton Rouge Parish. It spanned 2.02 miles (3.25 km) in a south to north direction, and was located completely within the city limits of Baton Rouge. It is known as Staring Lane.

== Route description ==
LA 425 provided access from Highland Road to Perkins Road. It met LA 30, which used Highland Road at the time, and continued north to LA 427, known as Perkins Road. It met the now-defunct LA 949, which used Hyacinth Avenue. Hyacinth Avenue was once a portion of Perkins Road.

It was an undivided, two-lane highway for its entire length.

Staring Lane continue to exist today as a locally maintained road, but extensions were later added its southern end. Staring Lane currently ends at LA 42 (Burbank Drive) since an extension was built in 2011. Construction is currently going on to widen Staring Lane to four lanes; this project is slated for completion in September 2013. Other plans in the works include extending Staring Lane to LA 30 (Nicholson Drive).

== History ==
The state highway was established in the 1955 renumbering. The road was turned over to city control in 1961. The number for LA 425 was reused for the extension of US 425.

== Major junctions ==
The entire highway was in Baton Rouge, East Baton Rouge Parish.

mi	km	Destinations	Notes
0.0	0.0	LA 30 (Highland Road) to LA 42	Southern terminus
1.3	2.1	LA 949 (Hyacinth Avenue)	Former alignment of Perkins Road
2.0	3.2	LA 427 (Perkins Road)	Northern terminus
1.000 mi = 1.609 km; 1.000 km = 0.621 mi
