= Louisiana Highway 44 =

State highway in Louisiana, United States

Louisiana Highway 44

Route information
- Maintained by Louisiana DOTD
- Length: 50.0 mi (80.5 km)
- Existed: 1955 renumbering–present

Major junctions
- West end: LA 42 in Prairieville
- US 61 in Gonzales; I-10 in Gonzales
- East end: US 61 in LaPlace

Location
- Country: United States
- State: Louisiana
- Parishes: Ascension, St. James, St. John the Baptist

Highway system
- Louisiana State Highway System; Interstate; US; State; Scenic
← LA 43	→ LA 45

Louisiana Highway 44 (LA 44) is a state highway in Louisiana that serves Ascension, St. James, and St. John the Baptist Parishes. It runs from west to east, parallel to the east bank of the Mississippi River, from Prairieville to LaPlace. It spans a total of 50.1 miles (80.6 km). Throughout its run, LA 44 is known as North/South Burnside Avenue, River Road, West/East Jefferson Highway, West 5th Street, and Main Street.

== Route description ==
From the west, LA 44 begins at an intersection with LA 42 (Oak Grove-Port Vincent Highway) in Prairieville. The highway travels south along North Burnside Avenue into Gonzales where it intersects with US 61 (North Airline Highway). Passing through downtown Gonzales, LA 44 has a brief concurrency with LA 429. After several blocks, the local name changes to South Burnside Avenue at an intersection with LA 3038 (East Cornerview Street), and LA 429 splits off to the west along West Cornerview Street. Leaving Gonzales, LA 44 continues south and intersects with I-10.

After three miles, LA 44 intersects with LA 22 as that highway runs between Sorrento and Darrow. A mile later, LA 44 reaches the east bank of the Mississippi River at an intersection with LA 942 at Burnside. Here, the route turns onto the River Road and soon crosses from Ascension Parish into St. James Parish. It then passes under and connects with the Sunshine Bridge, part of LA 70 to Donaldsonville.

Continuing downriver, LA 44 begins to follow a generally eastward direction passing through the communities of Convent, Paulina, Lutcher, and Gramercy. Jefferson Highway, the local name in use beginning in Lutcher, is a vestige of the road being part of that historic auto trail in the 1910s and 1920s. On the east side of Gramercy, LA 44 passes under and connects with a second Mississippi River crossing known as the Gramercy Bridge, part of LA 3213, just before entering St. John the Baptist Parish.

Continuing along the Mississippi River, LA 44 runs parallel to US 61 (Airline Highway) and passes through the communities of Mt. Airy, Garyville, Lions, and Reserve. LA 44 then enters LaPlace, turning away from the river at an intersection with LA 636 onto West 5th Street. Almost two miles later, LA 44 turns northeast onto Main Street at LA 628. The route ends at US 61 (West/East Airline Highway) near the southern terminus of US 51.

LA 44 is an undivided, two-lane highway from LA 42 to LA 621 in Gonzales, where it widens into an undivided, four-lane highway. At LA 30, LA 44 becomes a divided four-lane highway to just south of I-10, where it reverts to an undivided, two-lane highway for the remainder of its route to LaPlace.

== History ==
The portion of LA 44 running along the Mississippi River was once part of the Jefferson Highway auto trail designated in 1916 and the main traffic route between New Orleans and Baton Rouge prior to the construction of the Airline Highway in the 1930s. In 1921, it became part of State Route 1 in the pre-1955 Louisiana highway system and the original alignment of US 61 in 1926. US 61 also followed the Gonzales-Burnside section of LA 44 (pre-1955 State Route 88) briefly before being completely removed from the route following the opening of the Airline Highway in 1933.

== Major intersections ==
Parish	Location	mi	km	Destinations	Notes
Ascension	Prairieville	0.0	0.0	LA 42 (Oak Grove-Port Vincent Highway)	Western terminus
Ascension	Prairieville	0.7	1.1	LA 933 north	
Ascension	Gonzales	2.7	4.3	LA 931 (Germany Road)	
Ascension	Gonzales	3.8	6.1	LA 621	
Ascension	Gonzales	4.3	6.9	LA 934 (Black Bayou Road)	
Ascension	Gonzales	5.3	8.5	LA 935 south (Bayou Narcisse Road)	
Ascension	Gonzales	5.4	8.7	US 61 (North Airline Highway)	
Ascension	Gonzales	5.8	9.3	LA 938 west (West New River Street)	
Ascension	Gonzales	5.9	9.5	LA 429 east (East Ascension Street)	West end of LA 429 concurrency
Ascension	Gonzales	6.3	10.1	LA 429 west (West Cornerview Street) / LA 3038 east (East Cornerview Street)	East end of LA 429 concurrency
Ascension	Gonzales	6.8	10.9	LA 939 east (East Worthey Street)	
Ascension	Gonzales	7.3	11.7	LA 940 west (West Orice Roth Road)	
Ascension	Gonzales	7.8	12.6	LA 30	
Ascension	Gonzales	9.1	14.6	I-10	Interchange; exit 179 on I-10
Ascension	Gonzales	10.1	16.3	LA 941 north (Brittany Tower Road)	
Ascension	Burnside	12.1	19.5	LA 22	
Ascension	Burnside	12.9	20.8	LA 942 west (River Road)	
St. James		15.9	25.6	LA 70	Interchange
St. James	Convent	21.9	35.2	LA 3214 east	
St. James		31.7	51.0	LA 642 north	
St. James	Lutcher	34.9	56.2	LA 641 north (Albert Street)	
St. James	Lutcher	35.1	56.5	LA 3193 north (Lutcher Avenue)	
St. James	Gramercy	35.6	57.3	LA 3274 north (South Airline Avenue)	
St. James	Gramercy	36.4	58.6	LA 3213	Interchange
St. John the Baptist	Mt. Airy	39.7	63.9	LA 54 north	
St. John the Baptist	Reserve	44.0	70.8	LA 637 north (West 10th Street)	
St. John the Baptist	Reserve	44.8	72.1	LA 53 north (Central Avenue)	
St. John the Baptist	Reserve	45.7	73.5	LA 3179 north (East 22nd Street)	
St. John the Baptist	LaPlace	47.4	76.3	LA 636 east (West 2nd Street)	
St. John the Baptist	LaPlace	48.5	78.1	LA 3223 north (Elm Street)	
St. John the Baptist	LaPlace	48.6	78.2	LA 636-2 south (Fir Street)	
St. John the Baptist	LaPlace	48.8	78.5	LA 3224 north (Hemlock Street)	
St. John the Baptist	LaPlace	49.7	80.0	LA 628 east (East 5th Street)	
St. John the Baptist	LaPlace	50.1	80.6	US 61 (Airline Highway)	Eastern terminus
1.000 mi = 1.609 km; 1.000 km = 0.621 mi: Concurrency terminus

== See also ==
- List of state highways in Louisiana
