= Louisiana Highway 131 =

State highway in Louisiana, United States

Louisiana Highway 131

- Route of LA 131 highlighted in red

Route information
- Maintained by Louisiana DOTD
- Length: 6.803 mi (10.948 km)
- Existed: 1955 renumbering–present
- Tourist routes: National Scenic Byway: Great River Road

Major junctions
- South end: LA 15 at St. Genevieve
- North end: US 84 / US 425 in Vidalia

Location
- Country: United States
- State: Louisiana
- Parishes: Concordia

Highway system
- Louisiana State Highway System; Interstate; US; State; Scenic
← LA 130	→ LA 132

Louisiana Highway 131 (LA 131) is a state highway located in Concordia Parish, Louisiana. It runs 6.80 miles (10.94 km) in a southwest to northeast direction from LA 15 in St. Genevieve to U.S. Highway 84 (US 84) and U.S. Highway 425 (US 425) in Vidalia.

The route parallels the west bank of the Mississippi River, which forms the border between Louisiana and Mississippi. It connects Vidalia, the parish seat, with LA 15 southwest of town. Vidalia lies directly opposite the river from Natchez, Mississippi, the two being connected via the Natchez–Vidalia Bridge on US 84/US 425.

Originally a longer route that followed an overall north–south direction, LA 131 was truncated in favor of an extension of LA 15. Though it now runs in a more diagonal fashion and carries no directional banners, the route still performs a north–south travel function and is treated in the state highway system as such.

== Route description ==
From the south, LA 131 begins at an intersection with LA 15 in St. Genevieve. LA 15 parallels the Mississippi River north through points such as Deer Park and, upon reaching the junction with LA 131, turns to the northwest toward Ferriday. LA 131 proceeds straight ahead, curving eastward with the river through a rural area toward Vidalia, the parish seat of Concordia Parish. After 5.2 miles (8.4 km), LA 131 crosses the town limit and intersects LA 3180 (J. Logan Sewell Drive), which connects with US 84 and US 425 on the west side of town.

LA 131 enters Vidalia on Martin Luther King Avenue and curves to the northeast, passing through a largely residential area. After 1.6 miles (2.6 km), the route ends at an intersection with US 84-425 (Carter Street), the main highway through Vidalia. The northern terminus of LA 131 is located 0.2 miles (0.32 km) from the foot of the Mississippi River Bridge, which crosses the state line into Natchez, Mississippi. US 84 and US 425 run concurrently between Natchez and Ferriday, 8.7 miles (14.0 km) to the northwest.

=== Route classification and data ===
The route is classified by the Louisiana Department of Transportation and Development (La DOTD) as a rural major collector from the southern terminus to a point near LA 3180 and as an urban collector from there to the northern terminus. The average daily traffic volume in 2013 is reported as 3,400 for the majority of the route, with a slightly lower figure of 3,200 in Vidalia between Gillespie Street and the northern terminus. The route has a posted speed limit within Vidalia of 45 mph (70 km/h) from LA 3180 to Gillespie Street, reduced to 35 mph (55 km/h) from there to the northern terminus. LA 131 is an undivided two-lane highway for its entire length.

LA 131 is a small part of the ten-state Great River Road, which is designated as a National Scenic Byway.

== History ==
In the original Louisiana Highway system in use between 1921 and 1955, the modern LA 131 made up the northern portion of State Route 49. Route 49 was designated in 1921 by an act of the state legislature, roughly following the present LA 15 corridor southward along the Mississippi River from Vidalia to a point south of Shaw. It was projected to continue across the Lower Old River to Route 30 (the current LA 418) near Torras, but this section of the roadway was never constructed during the pre-1955 era.

LA 131 was created with the 1955 Louisiana Highway renumbering, following the former Route 49 from Vidalia southward as far as Shaw.

La 131—From a junction with a local road at or near Shaw through or near Deer Park and St. Genevieve to a junction with La-US 84 at or near Vidalia.

— 1955 legislative route description

Minor alterations in the route are indicated in the late 1950s, including a straightening of the route at Willetts (or Morville) and a smoother transition at Deer Park where the roadway descends from the river levee.

In the early 1960s, LA 15 was extended south from Clayton to Ferriday over US 65 (now US 425) and from there to LA 131 at St. Genevieve over a new alignment. LA 15 then replaced the LA 131 designation between St. Genevieve and Shaw. Shortly afterward, a further extension of LA 15 was constructed southward into Pointe Coupee Parish to connect with LA 1 at Lettsworth, essentially completing the route that had been planned for the former State Route 49 in 1921.

Since the early 1960s, the only change in the route of LA 131 has been a slight alteration in Vidalia that shifted the northern terminus at US 84/US 425 away from the foot of the Mississippi River Bridge.

== Major intersections ==
The entire highway is in Concordia Parish.

Location	mi	km	Destinations	Notes
St. Genevieve	0.000	0.000	LA 15 – Deer Park, Ferriday	Southern terminus
Vidalia	5.245	8.441	LA 3180 (J. Logan Sewell Drive)	Southern terminus of LA 3180
Vidalia	6.792– 6.803	10.931– 10.948	US 84 / US 425 – Natchez, Ferriday	Northern terminus
1.000 mi = 1.609 km; 1.000 km = 0.621 mi
