= Hobart, Louisiana =

- Unincorporated community
- Location of Hobart in Louisiana
- Coordinates: 30°19′21″N 90°56′20″W
- Country: United States
- State: Louisiana
- Parish: Ascension Parish
- Elevation: 23 ft (7.0 m)
- Time zone: UTC-6 (Central (CST))
  - Summer (DST): UTC-5 (CDT)
- Area code: 225
- GNIS feature ID: 543301

Hobart is an unincorporated community in Ascension Parish, Louisiana, United States, located in the vicinity of Prairieville. Hobart is located State Highway 42.
