= St. Amant, Louisiana =

St. Amant
- Unincorporated community
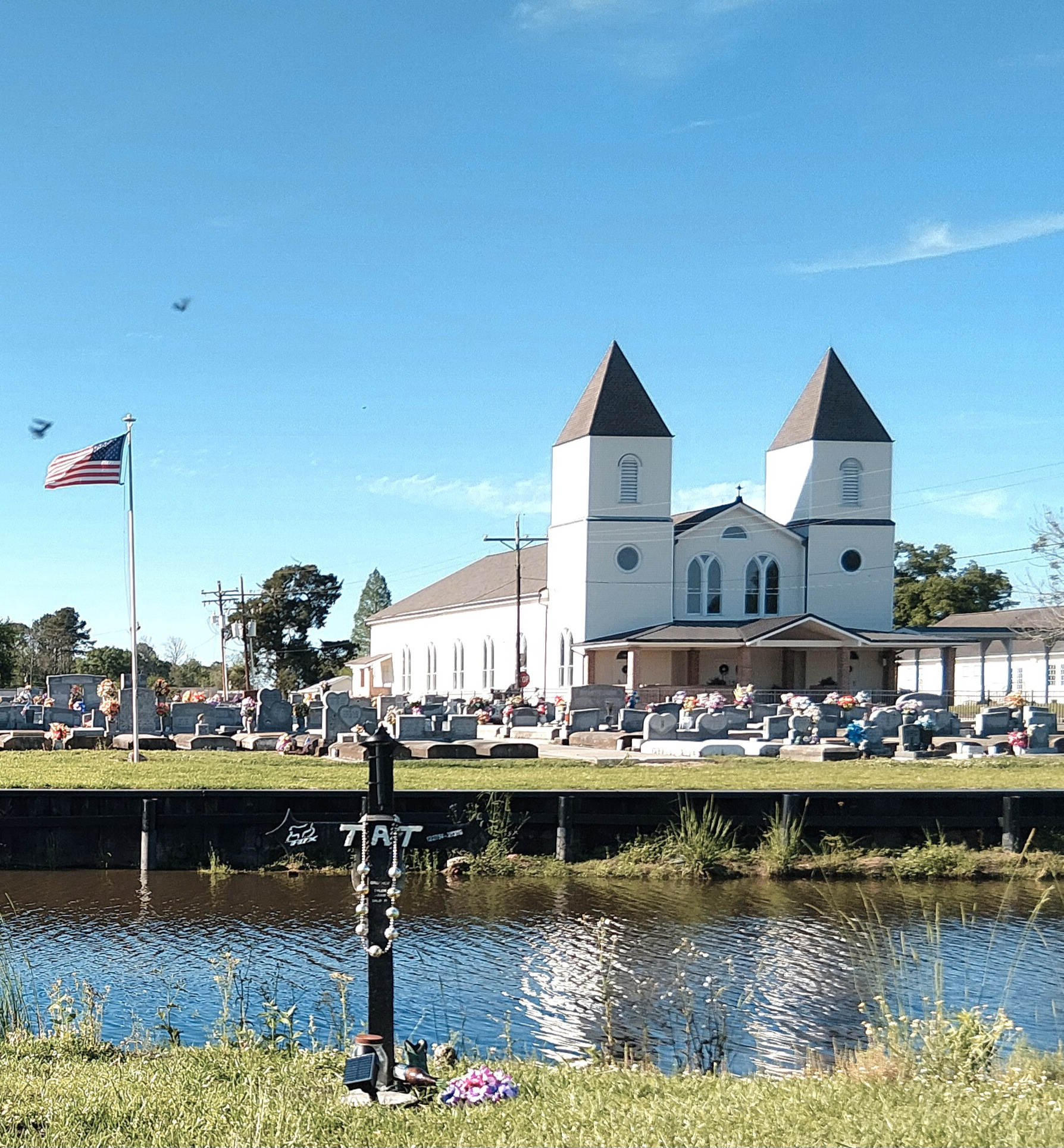
- Holy Rosary Catholic Church and cemetery across New River, with commemorative cross in foreground

- Location of St. Amant in Louisiana
- Coordinates: 30°13′29″N 90°52′08″W
- Country: United States
- State: Louisiana
- Parish: Ascension
- Elevation: 7 ft (2.1 m)
- Time zone: UTC-6 (CST)
  - Summer (DST): UTC-5 (CDT)
- Area code: 225

St. Amant (or Saint Amant) is an unincorporated community in Ascension Parish, in Louisiana. It is situated about 25 miles south-east of Baton Rouge and 50 miles northwest of New Orleans. It is named after the St. Amant family, some of the early settlers in the region. The area was originally known to the Native Americans and early French settlers as Duckroost, or Cabanocey. The Saint Amant post office has the ZIP code of 70774.

== Geography ==
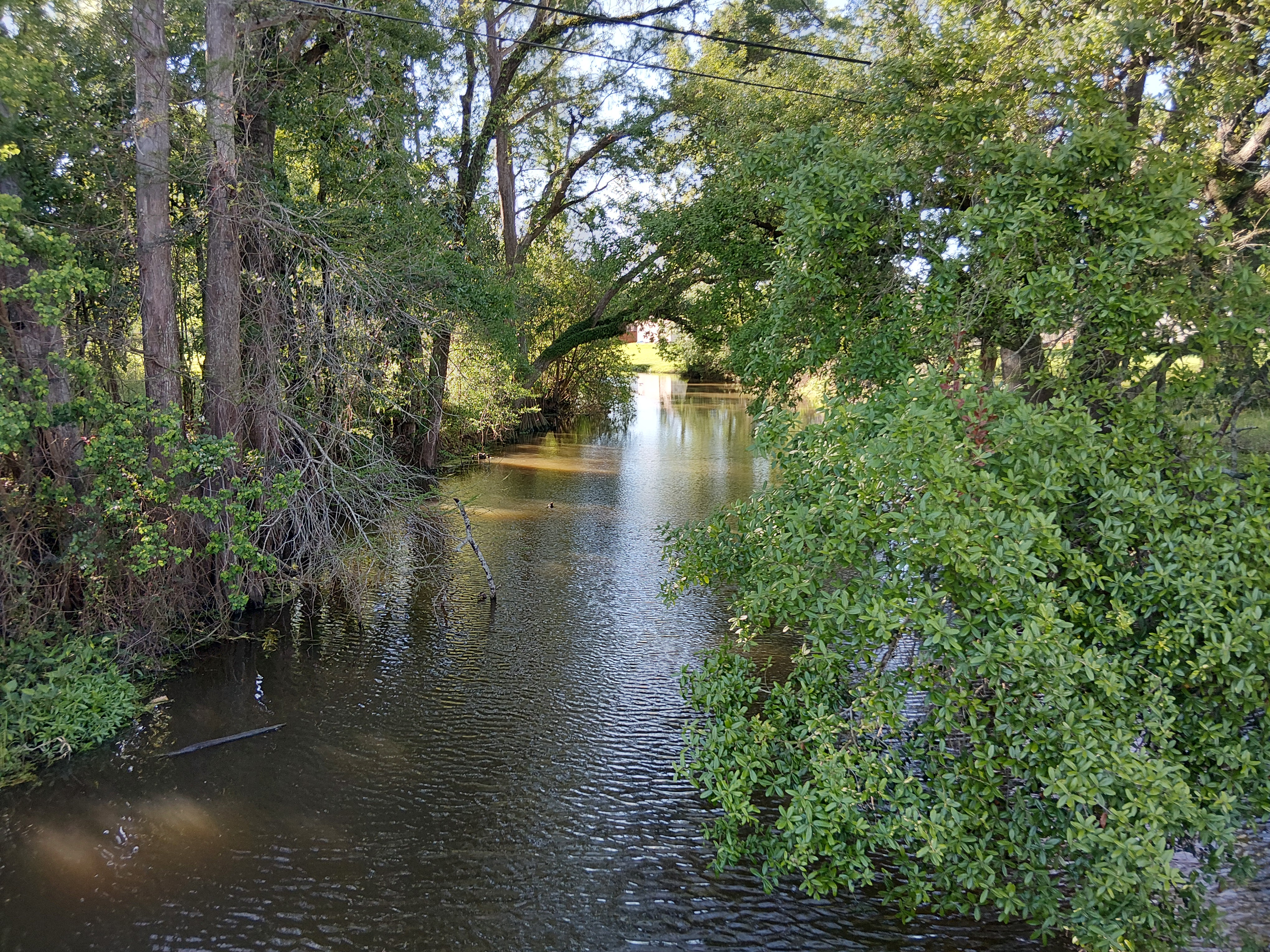
Duckroost Bayou

St. Amant is located near Gonzales, the largest city in Ascension Parish, which is three miles to the northwest.

== Education ==
The following schools are located within the community:

- St. Amant High School
- St. Amant Middle School
- St. Amant Primary School
- Lake Middle School
- Lake Primary School
- The high school is located on Highway 431. St. Amant middle school, primary school and the post office are located on Highway 429. Lake Elementary School is located on Highway 431.

== Notable people ==
- Reid Brignac, MLB shortstop
- Ben Sheets, MLB All-Star pitcher
- John "Hot Rod" Williams, NBA basketball player
- Jason Garey, MLS Player

== Notable events ==
St. Amant became the subject of national headlines after the 2016 Louisiana Floods, due to the devastation in the area. The area was visited by then-presidential candidate, Donald Trump.
