= West Ferriday, Louisiana =

- Unincorporated Community
- Location of West Ferriday in Louisiana
- Coordinates: 31°38′10″N 91°34′12″W
- Country: United States
- State: Louisiana
- Parish: Concordia

Area
  - Total: 13.5 sq mi (35 km^{2})
  - Land: 13.4 sq mi (35 km^{2})
  - Water: 0.1 sq mi (0.26 km^{2})
- Elevation: 52 ft (16 m)

Population (2000)
  - Total: 1,541
  - Density: 115/sq mi (44.4/km^{2})
- Time zone: UTC-6 (CST)
  - Summer (DST): UTC-5 (CDT)
- Area code: 318

West Ferriday is an Unincorporated Community and former census-designated place (CDP) in Concordia Parish, Louisiana, United States. The population was 1,541 at the 2000 census.

The area was not delineated as a CDP for the 2010 or the 2020 census.

== Geography ==
The West Ferriday CDP was located at 31°38′10″N 91°34′12″W (31.636089, -91.570005). The CDP covered unincorporated area west of the town of Ferriday and does not have an identifiable town center.

According to the United States Census Bureau, the CDP had a total area of 13.5 square miles (34.9 km^{2}), of which 13.4 square miles (34.7 km^{2}) was land and 0.1 square mile (0.2 km^{2}) (0.45%) was water.

== Demographics ==
Historical population
Census	Pop.	Note	%±
1980	1,399		—
1990	1,632		16.7%
2000	5,141		215.0%
U.S. Decennial Census; 1960 1970 1980; 1990 2000 2010

West Ferriday first appeared as a census designated place in the 1980 United States census. The CDP was deleted prior to the 2010 U.S. census.

As of the census of 2000, there were 1,541 people, 612 households, and 411 families residing in the CDP. The population density was 114.9 inhabitants per square mile (44.4/km^{2}). There were 669 housing units at an average density of 49.9 per square mile (19.3/km^{2}). The racial makeup of the CDP was 40.95% White, 57.56% African American, 0.06% Native American, 0.06% Asian, and 1.36% from two or more races. Hispanic or Latino of any race were 1.49% of the population.

There were 612 households, out of which 30.4% had children under the age of 18 living with them, 39.5% were married couples living together, 22.5% had a female householder with no husband present, and 32.8% were non-families. 29.7% of all households were made up of individuals, and 13.4% had someone living alone who was 65 years of age or older. The average household size was 2.52 and the average family size was 3.14.

In the CDP, the population was spread out, with 29.6% under the age of 18, 7.9% from 18 to 24, 24.1% from 25 to 44, 23.9% from 45 to 64, and 14.5% who were 65 years of age or older. The median age was 37 years. For every 100 females, there were 91.4 males. For every 100 females age 18 and over, there were 83.6 males.

The median income for a household in the CDP was $14,821, and the median income for a family was $20,714. Males had a median income of $18,611 versus $20,536 for females. The per capita income for the CDP was $9,089. About 34.7% of families and 43.8% of the population were below the poverty line, including 58.3% of those under age 18 and 42.0% of those age 65 or over.
