= Spokane, Louisiana =

- Census-designated place
- Location within Louisiana
- Coordinates: 31°43′40″N 91°26′30″W
- Country: United States
- State: Louisiana
- Parish: Concordia

Area
  - Total: 5.76 sq mi (14.92 km^{2})
  - Land: 2.35 sq mi (6.09 km^{2})
  - Water: 3.41 sq mi (8.83 km^{2})
- Elevation: 52 ft (16 m)

Population (2020)
  - Total: 378
  - Density: 160.6/sq mi (62.02/km^{2})
- Time zone: UTC-6 (CST)
  - Summer (DST): UTC-5 (CST)
- ZIP Codes: 71334
- Area Code: 318
- FIPS code: 22-72310
- GNIS feature ID: 2406839

Spokane is an unincorporated community and census-designated place (CDP) in Concordia Parish, Louisiana, United States. As of the 2020 census, Spokane had a population of 378.

It is located in northeastern Concordia Parish on the southwest side of Lake St. John, an oxbow lake that is a former channel of the Mississippi River. Louisiana State Highway 568 leads southwest from Spokane 7 miles (11 km) to Ferriday.

== Demographics ==
Historical population
Census	Pop.	Note	%±
2010	442		—
2020	378		−14.5%
U.S. Decennial Census

Spokane was first listed as a census designated place in the 2010 U.S. census.
