= Monterey, Louisiana =

- Census-designated place
- Location within Louisiana
- Coordinates: 31°26′37″N 91°43′09″W
- Country: United States
- State: Louisiana
- Parish: Concordia

Area
  - Total: 3.15 sq mi (8.15 km^{2})
  - Land: 2.83 sq mi (7.34 km^{2})
  - Water: 0.31 sq mi (0.81 km^{2})
- Elevation: 52 ft (16 m)

Population (2020)
  - Total: 474
  - Density: 167.3/sq mi (64.59/km^{2})
- Time zone: UTC-6 (CST)
  - Summer (DST): UTC-5 (CST)
- ZIP Codes: 71354
- Area Code: 318
- FIPS code: 22-51585
- GNIS feature ID: 2586696

Monterey is an unincorporated community and census-designated place (CDP) in Concordia Parish, Louisiana, United States. As of the 2020 census, Monterey had a population of 474.

The community is located near the junction of Louisiana Highways 129 and 565 in west central Concordia Parish, southwest of Ferriday. It is also part of the Natchez, MS–LA Micropolitan Statistical Area.

Monterey has a post office with the ZIP code 71354. Public education in the community is provided by Concordia Parish Schools

== Demographics ==
Historical population
Census	Pop.	Note	%±
2010	439		—
2020	474		8.0%
U.S. Decennial Census

Monterey was first listed as a census designated place in the 2010 U.S. census.
