= New River (Louisiana) =

Former distributary of the Mississippi River in Louisiana

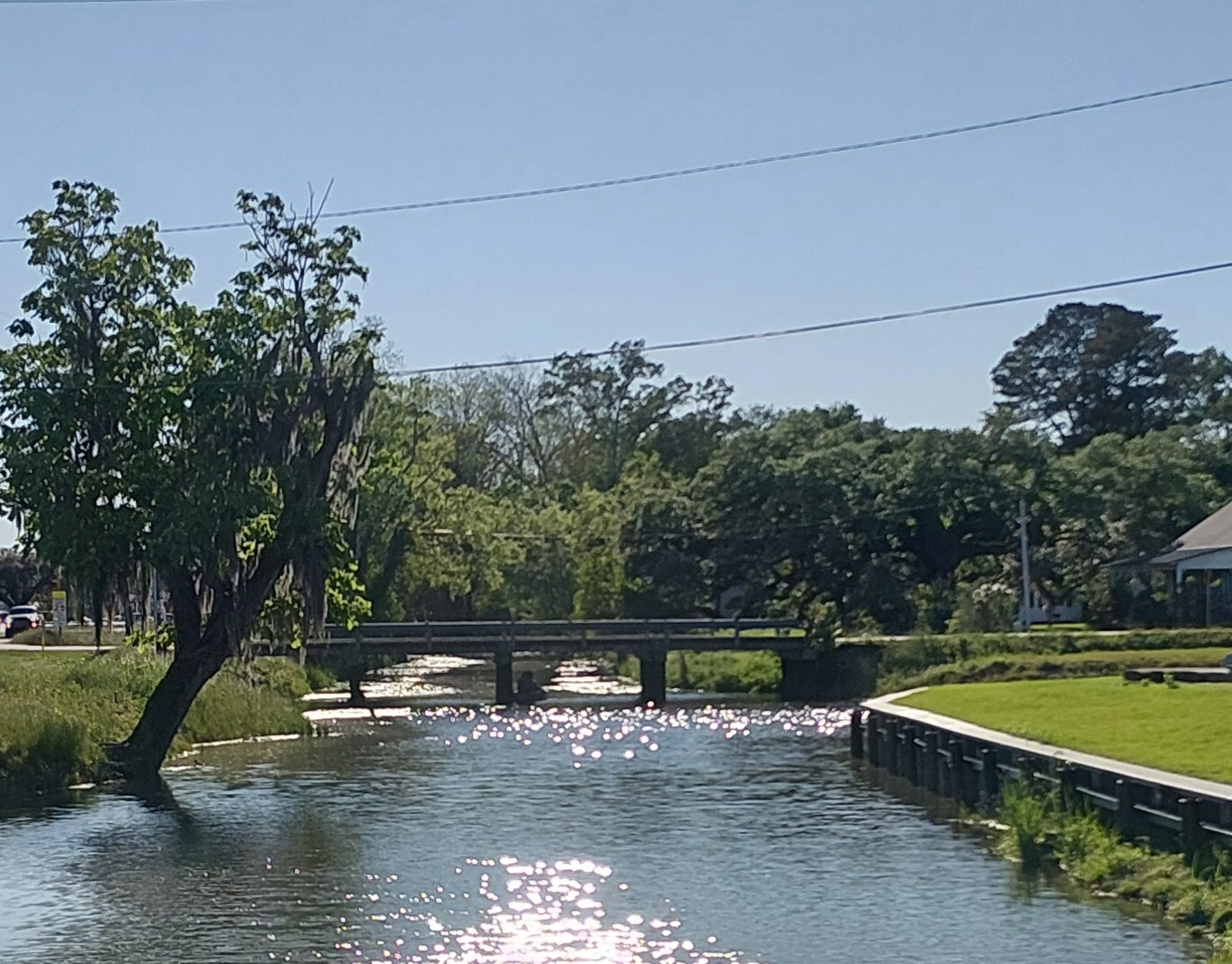
- New River at its confluence with Duckroost Bayou in Ascension Parish

Location
- Country: United States
- Parish: Ascension Parish

Physical characteristics
- Source
  - location: Near Geismar
  - coordinates: 30°12′15″N 91°01′02″W
- Mouth: New River Canal
  - location: Southeastern Ascension Parish
  - coordinates: 30°11′23″N 90°47′59″W
- Length: 24.0 miles (38.6 km)

Basin features
- Cities: Geismar; Dutchtown; Gonzales

New River is a 24.0-mile-long (38.6 km) waterway located in south Louisiana in Ascension Parish. Its source is near the Mississippi River in Geismar where the two rivers were once connected before the levees were built to contain the Mississippi River during the spring rise. New River was a distributary of the Mississippi River and a much larger river than it is today. Lack of river current has caused sediment to reduce both its depth and width.

New River originally meandered from Geismar passing through the city of Gonzales and the communities of St. Amant and Acy on its way to its mouth at Blind River. During the early part of the twentieth century a 5-mile (8 km) canal, called the New River Canal, was constructed to Petite Amite River, to increase its velocity and distance to Lake Maurepas. The portion of the original path of New River that continues to flow to Blind River is now a distributary of New River and is called Old New River. New River is a major drainage artery for east Ascension Parish, and it is part of the Lake Maurepas drainage basin.
