= Concordia Parish, Louisiana =

Parish in Louisiana, United States

Coordinates: 31.44°N 91.64°W

- Parish
- Parish of Concordia; Paroisse de Concordia (French); Parroquia de la Concordia (Spanish)
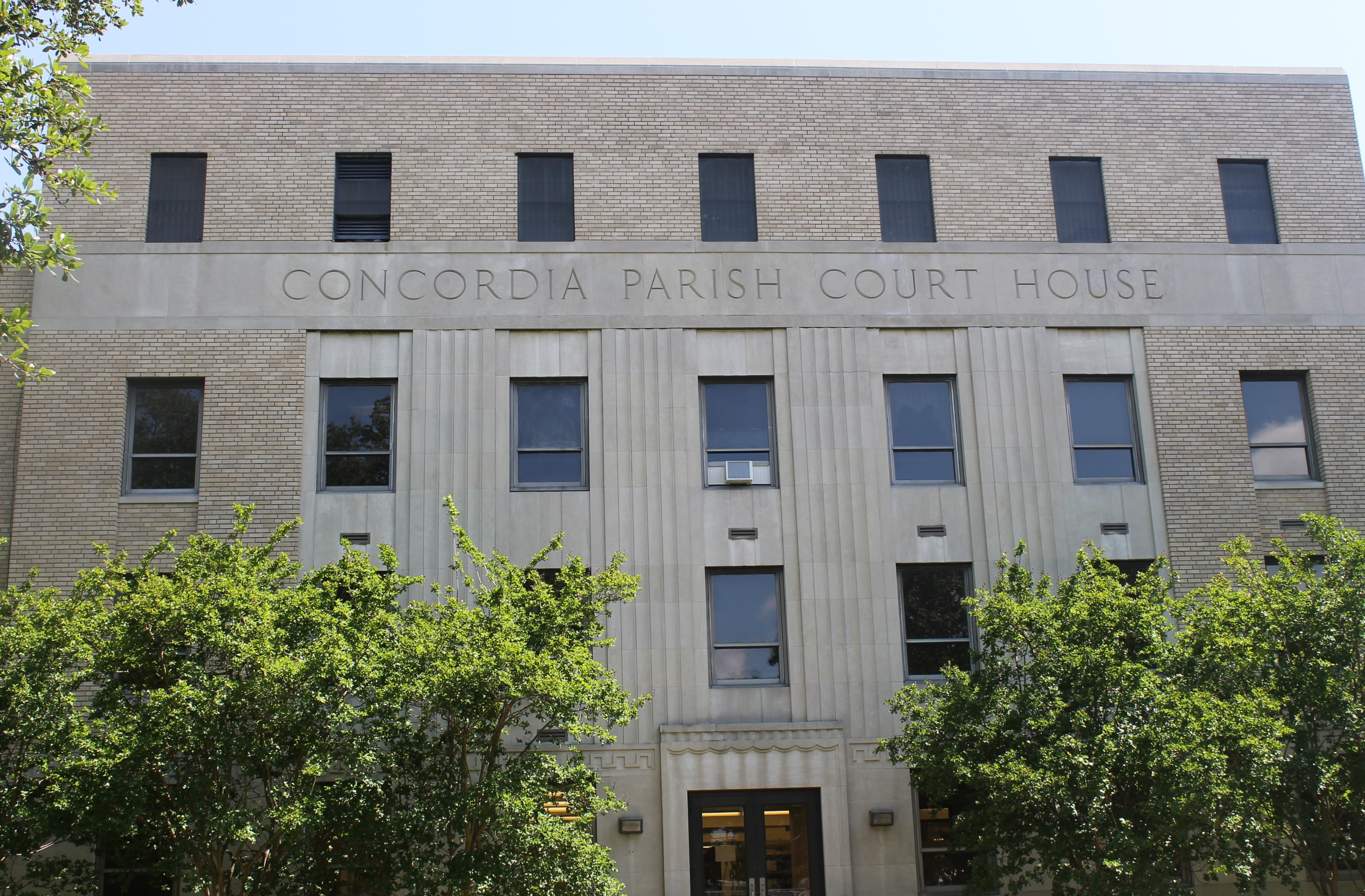
- Old Concordia Parish Courthouse in Vidalia

- Location within the U.S. state of Louisiana

- Louisiana's location within the U.S.
- Country: United States
- State: Louisiana
- Region: Central
- Founded: 1807
- Named for: Possibly a land grant, New Concordia
- Parish seat (and largest city): Vidalia

Area
  - Total: 747 sq mi (1,930 km^{2})
  - Land: 697 sq mi (1,810 km^{2})
  - Water: 50 sq mi (130 km^{2})
  - percentage: 6.7 sq mi (17 km^{2})

Population (2020)
  - Total: 18,687
  - Estimate (2025): 17,836 ▼
  - Density: 26.8/sq mi (10.4/km^{2})
- Time zone: UTC-6 (CST)
  - Summer (DST): UTC-5 (CDT)
- Area code: 318
- Congressional district: 5th
- Website: www.conppj.org

Concordia Parish (Spanish: Parroquia de la Concordia; French: Paroisse de Concordia) is a parish that borders the Mississippi River in eastern central Louisiana. As of the 2020 census, the population was 18,687. The parish seat is Vidalia. The parish was formed in 1807.

Concordia Parish is part of the Natchez, MS–LA Micropolitan Statistical Area. It is historically considered part of the Natchez District, devoted to cotton cultivation as a commodity crop, in contrast to the sugar cane crop of southern Louisiana. Other Louisiana parishes of similar character are East and West Carroll, Madison and Tensas, all in this lowlying delta land. On the east side of the Mississippi River is the Natchez District around the city of Natchez, Mississippi.

== History ==
=== Prehistory ===
Concordia Parish was the home to many successive Native American cultures for thousands of years before European encounter. Peoples of the Marksville culture, Troyville culture, Coles Creek culture and Plaquemine culture built villages and earthwork mound sites throughout the area. Notable examples include Cypress Grove Mound, DePrato Mounds, Frogmore Mound Site, and Lamarque Landing Mound.

Historic Native American tribes encountered by early French explorers and colonists were the following:

=== Historic era ===
Concordia was named by Anglo-American settlers for a Latin word meaning "harmony". They came mostly after the Louisiana Purchase of 1803, when the United States took over this formerly French colonial area west of the Mississippi. Like other parishes of the lands along the Mississippi River, in the antebellum era, the parish was developed for cotton cultivation on large plantations. The labor-intensive crop was profitable because of the labor of enslaved African Americans.

In 1789, Don Jose Vidal, a resident of Natchez, MS and later the founder of the city of Vidalia, LA asked for land grants to move his family from Natchez to the other side of the Mississippi River. In Natchez, there was a mansion built called Concord (Natchez, Mississippi), this was a residence lived in by Spanish governors. Vidal moved his family across the Mississippi River to the Louisiana side after the time era of the US began.

The Mansion started the name "Concord" and ultimately later led to the birth of what would be Concordia Parish. During the year of 1804, a ceremony of transfer was held and the citizens and Mayor of Natchez crossed over to the Louisiana side of the Mississippi to honor the new land that was founded. The Mansion was later struck by fire in the early 20th century (1901) and burned down. Natchez people also lived on both sides of the land.

"Concordia County" was a creation of the first Legislative Council held in New Orleans on December 2, 1804. Its territory that included parts of the present parishes of East Carroll, Madison, and Tensas. Land between the Mississippi, Red, Black, and Tensaw rivers comprised the early local administration of Concordia.

Because Concordia's alluvial soil was unusually productive for cotton growing, it attracted large plantations, whose owners enslaved a very high number of people. In 1860, slaves made up 91 percent of Concordia Parish's residents, the highest percentage of any Louisiana parish. Only two counties in the United States — Washington and Issaquena counties in Mississippi — had a higher percentage of its population enslaved. As might be expected, the small number of white cotton planters in Concordia were fierce defenders of chattel slavery and strongly backed the Confederacy during the American Civil War.

== Law and government ==
The current elected sheriff is David Hedrick.

Concordia Parish is a bellwether for the state of Louisiana, consistently reflecting the state's presidential election outcomes since 1964. The parish trends Democratic for local offices. For national offices, the majority has favored Republican candidates. In the 2008 presidential election, the Democrat Barack Obama of Illinois received 3,766 votes (39.5 percent) in Concordia Parish to 5,668 (59.5 percent) for the Republican nominee, John McCain of Arizona. In 2004, Concordia Parish cast 5,427 votes (60 percent) for President George W. Bush and 3,446 ballots (38 percent) for his Democratic rival, Senator John F. Kerry of Massachusetts.

United States presidential election results for Concordia Parish, Louisiana
Year	Republican		Democratic		Third party(ies)	
Year	No.	%	No.	%	No.	%
1912	6	2.67%	205	91.11%	14	6.22%
1916	10	3.61%	264	95.31%	3	1.08%
1920	12	3.06%	380	96.94%	0	0.00%
1924	46	12.60%	319	87.40%	0	0.00%
1928	133	18.37%	591	81.63%	0	0.00%
1932	20	1.96%	999	98.04%	0	0.00%
1936	58	4.79%	1,152	95.13%	1	0.08%
1940	119	9.21%	1,173	90.79%	0	0.00%
1944	201	17.11%	974	82.89%	0	0.00%
1948	98	6.25%	329	21.00%	1,140	72.75%
1952	1,110	46.99%	1,252	53.01%	0	0.00%
1956	841	39.74%	699	33.03%	576	27.22%
1960	1,009	30.29%	768	23.06%	1,554	46.65%
1964	4,022	83.25%	809	16.75%	0	0.00%
1968	974	12.99%	1,983	26.44%	4,542	60.57%
1972	4,521	64.37%	2,142	30.50%	360	5.13%
1976	3,849	48.65%	3,892	49.19%	171	2.16%
1980	4,933	54.20%	3,956	43.46%	213	2.34%
1984	6,177	63.73%	3,332	34.38%	183	1.89%
1988	5,037	57.49%	3,461	39.50%	263	3.00%
1992	3,223	35.23%	4,283	46.82%	1,642	17.95%
1996	3,134	35.96%	4,565	52.38%	1,016	11.66%
2000	4,627	54.44%	3,569	41.99%	303	3.57%
2004	5,427	60.43%	3,446	38.37%	107	1.19%
2008	5,668	59.49%	3,766	39.53%	93	0.98%
2012	5,450	58.10%	3,833	40.86%	97	1.03%
2016	5,477	61.73%	3,272	36.88%	123	1.39%
2020	5,550	62.87%	3,177	35.99%	101	1.14%
2024	4,974	64.14%	2,698	34.79%	83	1.07%

== Geography ==
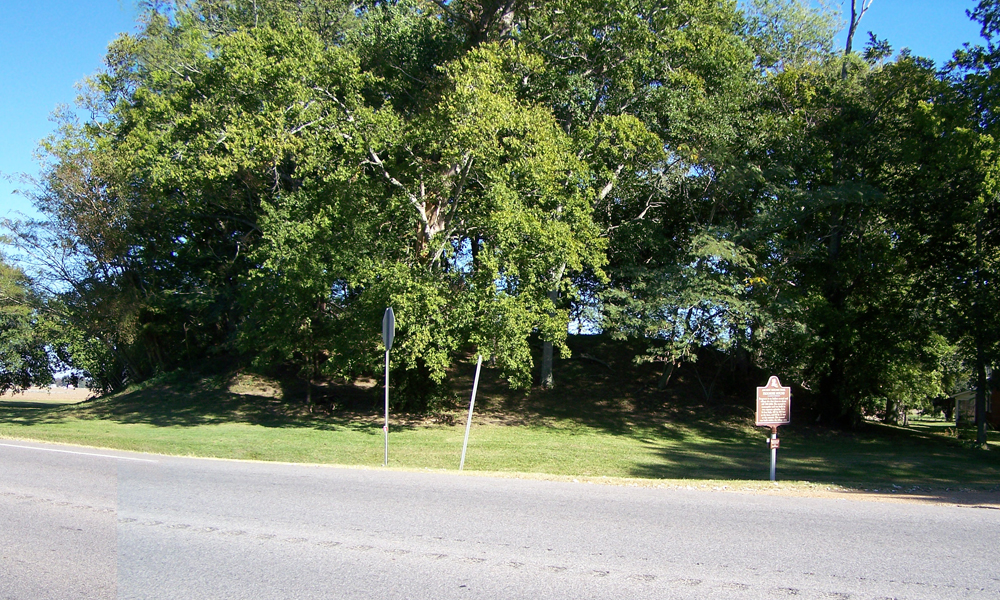
Frogmore Mound Site on U.S. Highway 84 near Ferriday

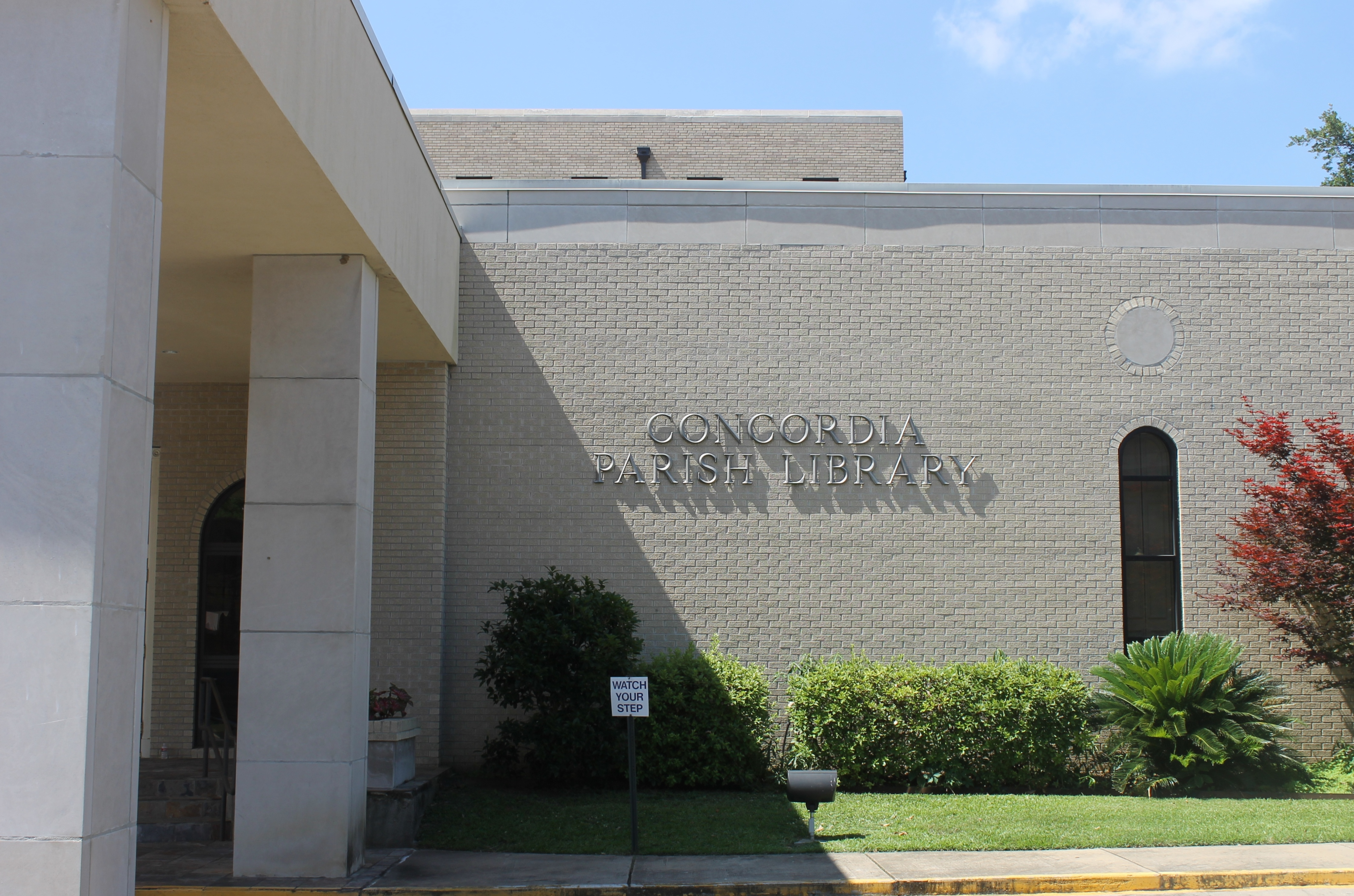
The Concordia Parish Library is located in Vidalia behind the parish courthouse.

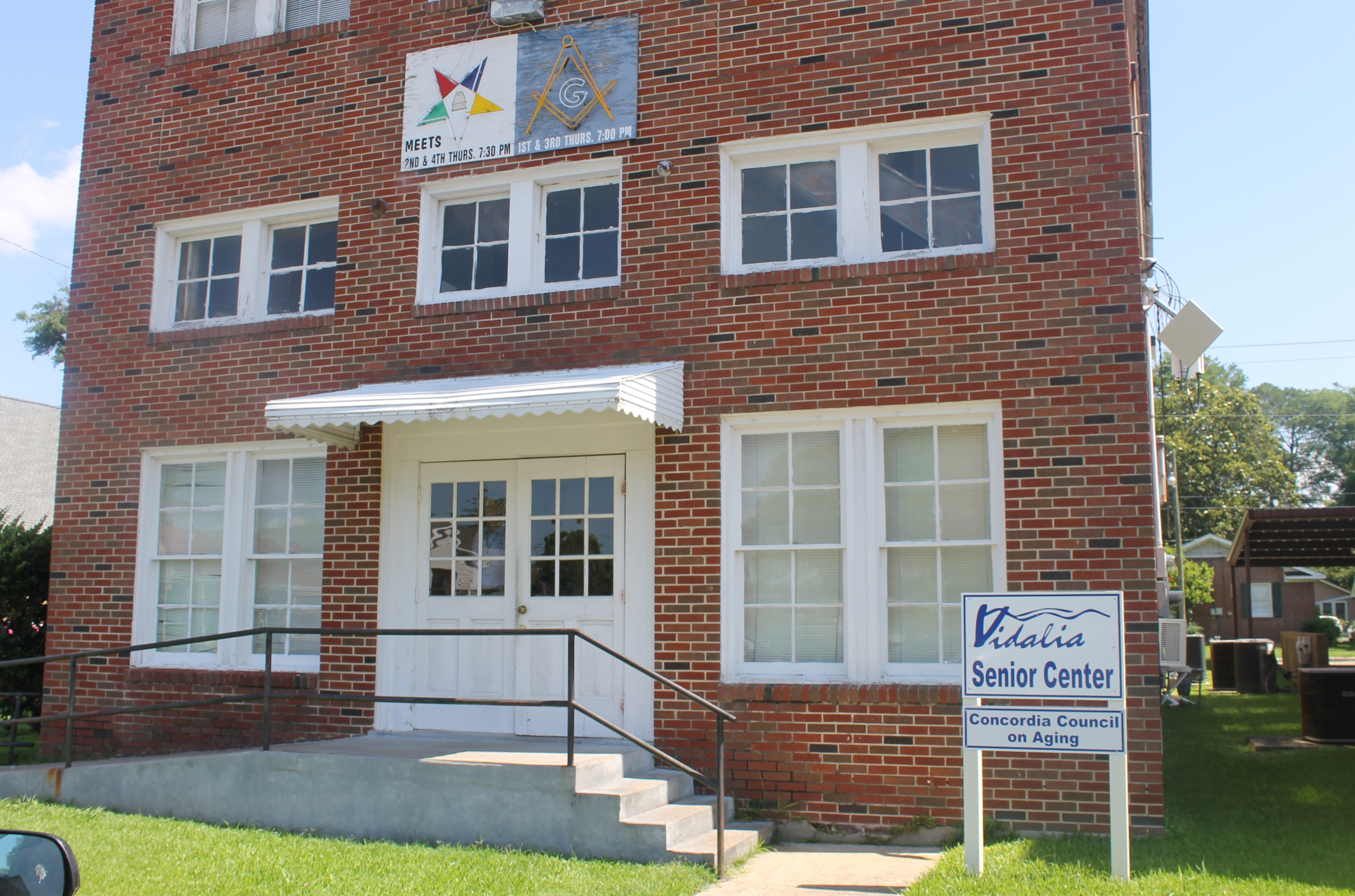
The Vidalia Senior Center is operated by the Concordia Council on Aging.

According to the U.S. Census Bureau, the parish has a total area of 747 square miles (1,930 km^{2}), of which 697 square miles (1,810 km^{2}) is land and 50 square miles (130 km^{2}) (6.7%) is water.

The parish is completely agricultural bottomlands. The Ouachita River runs along the west boundary, the Red River along the south, and the Mississippi River along the east. All three rivers are contained by large levee systems.

=== Major highways ===
- U.S. Highway 65
- U.S. Highway 84
- U.S. Highway 425
- Louisiana Highway 15
- Louisiana Highway 129
- Louisiana Highway 131
- Louisiana Highway 565
- Louisiana Highway 566
- Louisiana Highway 568
- Louisiana Highway 569
- Louisiana Highway 900
- Louisiana Highway 903
- Louisiana Highway 906
- Louisiana Highway 907
- Louisiana Highway 908
- Louisiana Highway 909
- Louisiana Highway 910
- Louisiana Highway 3180
- Louisiana Highway 3196
- Louisiana Highway 3232

=== Adjacent counties and parishes ===
- Tensas Parish (north)
- Adams County, Mississippi (northeast)
- Wilkinson County, Mississippi (east)
- West Feliciana Parish (southeast)
- Pointe Coupee Parish (south)
- Avoyelles Parish (southwest)
- Catahoula Parish (west)

=== National protected area ===
- Bayou Cocodrie National Wildlife Refuge

=== State protected area ===
- Richard K. Yancey Wildlife Management Area

== Demographics ==
Historical population
Census	Pop.	Note	%±
1820	2,626		—
1830	4,662		77.5%
1840	9,414		101.9%
1850	7,758		−17.6%
1860	13,805		77.9%
1870	9,977		−27.7%
1880	14,914		49.5%
1890	14,871		−0.3%
1900	13,559		−8.8%
1910	14,278		5.3%
1920	12,466		−12.7%
1930	12,778		2.5%
1940	14,562		14.0%
1950	14,398		−1.1%
1960	20,467		42.2%
1970	22,578		10.3%
1980	22,981		1.8%
1990	20,828		−9.4%
2000	20,247		−2.8%
2010	20,822		2.8%
2020	18,687		−10.3%
2025 (est.)	17,836	▼	−4.6%
U.S. Decennial Census; 1790-1960 1900-1990; 1990-2000 2010

=== 2020 census ===
As of the 2020 census, there were 18,687 people and 4,562 families residing in the parish.

The median age was 40.1 years. 23.9% of residents were under the age of 18 and 18.8% of residents were 65 years of age or older. For every 100 females there were 96.2 males, and for every 100 females age 18 and over there were 94.1 males age 18 and over.

65.9% of residents lived in urban areas, while 34.1% lived in rural areas.

Of the 7,225 households in the parish, 31.2% had children under the age of 18 living in them. Of all households, 36.6% were married-couple households, 19.8% were households with a male householder and no spouse or partner present, and 37.5% were households with a female householder and no spouse or partner present. About 30.0% of all households were made up of individuals and 13.2% had someone living alone who was 65 years of age or older.

There were 8,964 housing units, of which 19.4% were vacant. Among occupied housing units, 68.3% were owner-occupied and 31.7% were renter-occupied. The homeowner vacancy rate was 2.0% and the rental vacancy rate was 11.3%.

The racial makeup of the parish was 55.0% White, 40.2% Black or African American, 0.3% American Indian and Alaska Native, 0.6% Asian, <0.1% Native Hawaiian and Pacific Islander, 1.0% from some other race, and 2.9% from two or more races. Hispanic or Latino residents of any race comprised 2.5% of the population.

=== Racial and ethnic composition ===
Concordia Parish, Louisiana – Racial and ethnic composition Note: the US Census treats Hispanic/Latino as an ethnic category. This table excludes Latinos from the racial categories and assigns them to a separate category. Hispanics/Latinos may be of any race.
Race / Ethnicity (NH = Non-Hispanic)	Pop 1980	Pop 1990	Pop 2000	Pop 2010	Pop 2020	% 1980	% 1990	% 2000	% 2010	% 2020
White alone (NH)	14,759	13,082	12,172	11,829	10,157	64.22%	62.81%	60.12%	56.81%	54.35%
Black or African American alone (NH)	8,009	7,564	7,573	8,503	7,477	34.85%	36.32%	37.40%	40.84%	40.01%
Native American or Alaska Native alone (NH)	23	27	33	62	39	0.10%	0.13%	0.16%	0.30%	0.21%
Asian alone (NH)	17	24	47	49	115	0.07%	0.12%	0.23%	0.24%	0.62%
Native Hawaiian or Pacific Islander alone (NH)	x	x	1	4	0	x	x	0.00%	0.02%	0.00%
Other race alone (NH)	9	1	11	12	16	0.04%	0.00%	0.05%	0.06%	0.09%
Mixed race or Multiracial (NH)	x	x	110	154	424	x	x	0.54%	0.74%	2.27%
Hispanic or Latino (any race)	164	130	300	209	459	0.71%	0.62%	1.48%	1.00%	2.46%
Total	22,981	20,828	20,247	20,822	18,687	100.00%	100.00%	100.00%	100.00%	100.00%

=== 2000 census ===
As of the census of 2000, there were 20,247 people, 7,521 households, and 5,430 families residing in the parish. The population density was 29 inhabitants per square mile (11/km^{2}). There were 9,148 housing units at an average density of 13 per square mile (5.0/km^{2}). The racial makeup of the parish was 57.9% White, 40.7% Black or African American, 0.16% Native American, 0.3% Asian, 0.55% from other races, and 0.8% from two or more races. 1.2% of the population were Hispanic or Latino of any race.

There were 7,521 households, out of which 33.00% had children under the age of 18 living with them, 49.00% were married couples living together, 19.00% had a female householder with no husband present, and 27.80% were non-families. 25.30% of all households were made up of individuals, and 11.50% had someone living alone who was 65 years of age or older. The average household size was 2.60 and the average family size was 3.12.

In the parish the population was spread out, with 27.80% under the age of 18, 8.90% from 18 to 24, 25.60% from 25 to 44, 23.00% from 45 to 64, and 14.70% who were 65 years of age or older. The median age was 37 years. For every 100 females, there were 95.20 males. For every 100 females age 18 and over, there were 91.90 males.

The median income for a household in the parish was $22,742, and the median income for a family was $28,629. Males had a median income of $27,453 versus $18,678 for females. The per capita income for the parish was $11,966. About 24.30% of families and 29.10% of the population were below the poverty line, including 42.00% of those under age 18 and 20.60% of those age 65 or over.

== Education ==
Concordia Parish School Board operates public schools in the parish.

=== Libraries ===
The Concordia Parish Library has 3 branches and a bookmobile service for all citizens of Concordia Parish.

- Ferriday Branch - 1609 Third Street, Ferriday, LA
- Vidalia Branch - 408 Texas Street, Vidalia, LA
- Clayton Branch - 31451 HWY-15 Clayton, LA

==== History ====
The Concordia Parish Library is the second oldest Parish Library in Louisiana and the first of such to be tax-supported. The library began as a movement between the President of the Tri-Parish Community Organization who had obtained a community program and a State Librarian at the time, Essae Martha Culver. The two held a dinner where they launched a library movement in Concordia Parish. The Ferriday Rotary Club and Police Jury along with the public worked with the Louisiana Library Commission on the project and in October 1928 the Concordia Parish Demonstration Library was opened. Citizens of the parish voted to implement a tax to ensure the library could continue to function after seeing the advantages provided by the library. The library moved in 1952 to its present-day main building site in Ferriday, Louisiana. In that same year the interested clubs of Ferriday and the Parish Library, The Concordia Parish Police Jury turned the Community Center over to the Concordia Parish Library to be operated as a parish library for all citizens of Concordia under the supervision of the Concordia Parish Library Board.

==== Library Cards ====
The library serves the citizens who reside in the boundaries of Concordia Parish. Any person permanently residing in Concordia Parish can use the services of a library with a library card. There are two types of library cards offered:

- Library Card: allows patrons to check out physical materials and use electronic services. This card requires two items of price of residents AND a photo identification. Card is issued without charge.
- Online Registration: allows access to Wi-Fi, public access, e-services, and downloadable databases.

== National Guard ==
1086th Transportation Company of the 165th CSS (Combat Service Support) Battalion of the 139th RSG (Regional Support Group) is based in Vidalia, Louisiana on the west bank of the Mississippi River.

== Communities ==
=== City ===
- Vidalia (parish seat and largest municipality)

=== Towns ===
- Ferriday
- Clayton
- Ridgecrest

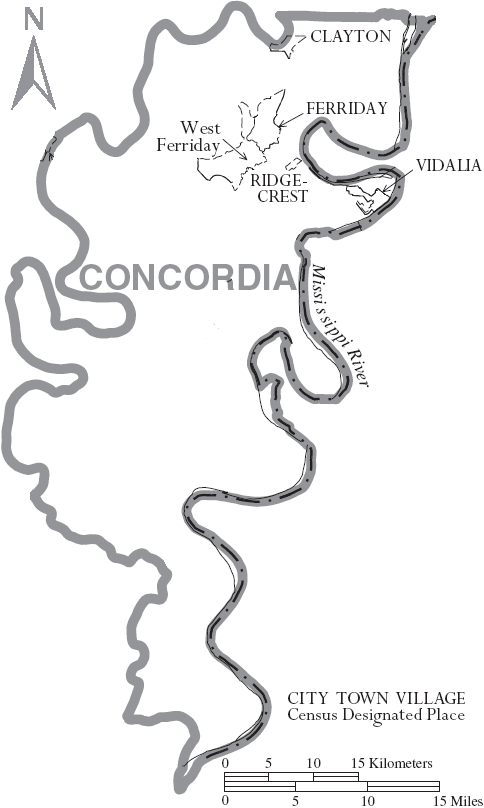
Map of Concordia Parish, with municipal labels

=== Census-designated places ===
- Minorca
- Monterey
- Spokane

=== Other unincorporated communities ===
- Acme
- Ashland
- Black Hawk
- Dunbarton
- Eva
- Fairview
- Frogmore
- Mayna
- New Era
- West Ferriday

== Notable people ==
=== Arts and entertainment ===
- Jerry Lee Lewis, musician
- Jimmy Swaggart, televangelist
- Mickey Gilley, musician

=== Journalism ===
- Campbell Brown, Emmy-award-winning journalist, CNN Anchor/host.
- Howard K. Smith, ABC and CBS commentator

=== Politics ===
- Al Ater, State representative (1984–1988) and secretary of state (2005–2006)
- Clifford Cleveland Brooks, planter in St. Joseph, represented Concordia Parish in the Louisiana State Senate from 1924 to 1932.
- Charles C. Cordill, Louisiana state senator representing Concordia and Tensas parishes from 1884 to 1912
- Brenham C. Crothers, Ferriday cattleman; state senator from delta parishes from 1948 to 1952 and 1956−1960
- Bryant Hammett, state representative, 1992–2006
- Consuelo Montagu, Duchess of Manchester (1858−1909), spent part of her childhood at Ravenswood Place plantation, in the vicinity of Lake St. John.
- Ed Rand, late state representative (1960−1964) from Rapides Parish had a second home on Lake St. John.
- J. Robert Wooley, state insurance commissioner (2000−2006)

== See also ==
- National Register of Historic Places listings in Concordia Parish, Louisiana
