= Minorca, Louisiana =

- Census-designated place
- Location within Louisiana
- Coordinates: 31°34′27″N 91°29′47″W
- Country: United States
- State: Louisiana
- Parish: Concordia

Area
  - Total: 4.53 sq mi (11.74 km^{2})
  - Land: 4.47 sq mi (11.57 km^{2})
  - Water: 0.066 sq mi (0.17 km^{2})
- Elevation: 56 ft (17 m)

Population (2020)
  - Total: 2,156
  - Density: 482.6/sq mi (186.35/km^{2})
- Time zone: UTC-6 (CST)
  - Summer (DST): UTC-5 (CST)
- ZIP Codes: 71373
- Area Code: 318
- FIPS code: 22-50990
- GNIS feature ID: 2586695

Minorca is an unincorporated community and census-designated place (CDP) in Concordia Parish, Louisiana, United States. As of the 2020 census, Minorca had a population of 2,156. It is located in northeastern Concordia Parish, bordered on the east by the city of Vidalia.

U.S. Routes 84 and 425 pass through the northern part of the CDP, leading east through Vidalia 5 miles (8 km) to Natchez, Mississippi, and northwest 6 miles (10 km) to Ferriday. The Mississippi state line, following a former channel of the Mississippi River, is directly north of Minorca.

== Demographics ==
Historical population
Census	Pop.	Note	%±
2010	2,317		—
2020	2,156		−6.9%
U.S. Decennial Census

Minorca was first listed as a census designated place in the 2010 U.S. census.

=== 2020 census ===
Minorca racial composition
Race	Number	Percentage
White (non-Hispanic)	1,375	63.78%
Black or African American (non-Hispanic)	636	29.5%
Native American	4	0.19%
Other/Mixed	90	4.17%
Hispanic or Latino	51	2.37%

As of the 2020 United States census, there were 2,156 people, 667 households, and 409 families residing in the CDP.
