= Wallace Ridge, Louisiana =

- Census-designated place
- Hamlet of Wallace Ridge
- Location within Louisiana
- Coordinates: 31°41′06″N 91°49′55″W
- Country: United States
- State: Louisiana
- Parish: Catahoula

Area
  - Total: 7.46 sq mi (19.33 km^{2})
  - Land: 7.00 sq mi (18.13 km^{2})
  - Water: 0.46 sq mi (1.20 km^{2})
- Elevation: 59 ft (18 m)

Population (2020)
  - Total: 572
  - Density: 81.7/sq mi (31.54/km^{2})
- Time zone: UTC-6 (CST)
  - Summer (DST): UTC-5 (CST)
- ZIP Codes: 71343
- Area Code: 318
- FIPS code: 22-79310
- GNIS feature ID: 2586718

Wallace Ridge is an unincorporated community and census-designated place (CDP) in Catahoula Parish, Louisiana, United States. As of the 2020 census, Wallace Ridge had a population of 572. It is located northeast of the center of Catahoula Parish on the west side of the Ouachita River. Tew Lake, a former channel of the river that is now an oxbow lake, is in the northern part of the CDP, and Wallace Lake, another oxbow, borders the southern part. The original community of Wallace Ridge is on relatively higher ground on the north side of Tew Lake.

Louisiana State Highway 124 passes through Wallace Ridge, leading north 5 miles (8 km) to Harrisonburg, the Catahoula Parish seat, and south 4 miles (6 km) to Jonesville, the largest town in the parish.

== Demographics ==
Historical population
Census	Pop.	Note	%±
2010	710		—
2020	572		−19.4%
U.S. Decennial Census

Wallace Ridge was first listed as a census designated place in the 2010 U.S. census.
