= Mount Airy, Louisiana =

Unincorporated community in Louisiana

- Unincorporated community
- Location within Louisiana Location within the United States
- Coordinates: 30°03′05″N 90°38′16″W
- Country: United States
- State: Louisiana
- Parish: St. John the Baptist
- Elevation: 10 ft (3.0 m)
- Time zone: UTC-6 (Central (CST))
  - Summer (DST): UTC-5 (CDT)
- ZIP code: 70076
- Area code: 985
- GNIS feature ID: 1627707

Mount Airy is an unincorporated community in St. John the Baptist Parish, Louisiana, United States. Its ZIP code is 70076.
