= Cannonsburg, Mississippi =

- Unincorporated community
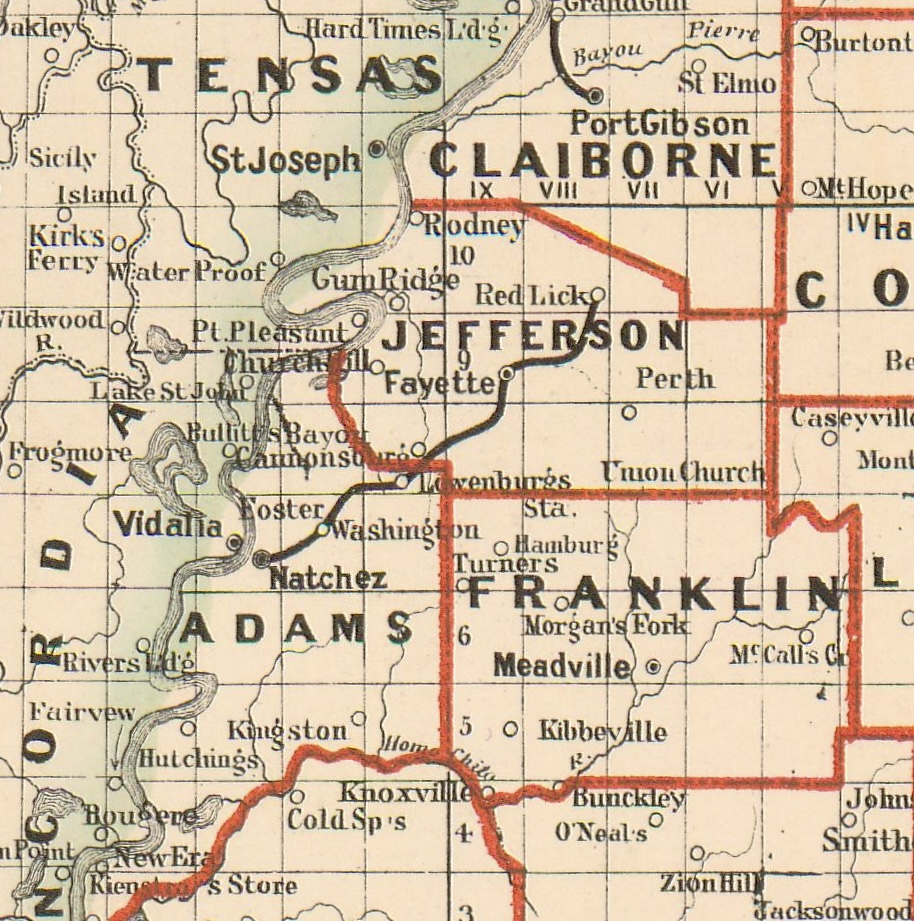
- Map of railroad line in Adams County and Jefferson County c. 1879

- Location within Mississippi Location within the United States
- Coordinates: 31°38′02″N 91°12′40″W
- Country: United States
- State: Mississippi
- County: Jefferson
- Elevation: 276 ft (84 m)
- Time zone: UTC-6 (Central (CST))
  - Summer (DST): UTC-5 (CDT)
- GNIS feature ID: 690909

Cannonsburg (also Cannonsburgh) is an unincorporated community in Jefferson County, Mississippi, United States.

It is located on U.S. Route 61, 11 mi (18 km) southwest of Fayette.

== History ==
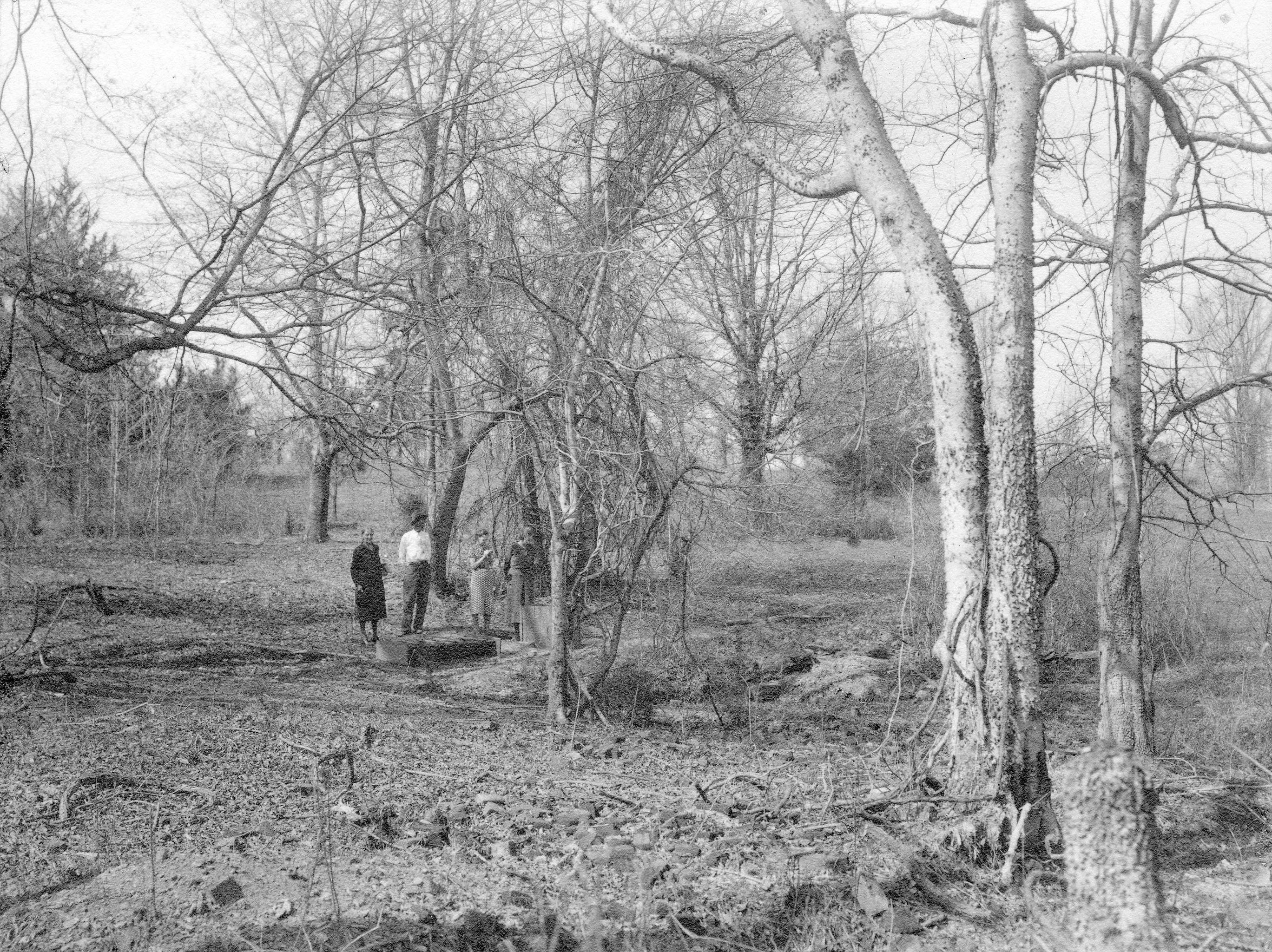
Shackleford Spring in Cannonsburg, where Andrew Jackson's weary troops camped and refreshed themselves while marching against the British during the War of 1812.

Bethel Church was established in Cannonsburg in 1804, the first Presbyterian Church in the Mississippi Territory. A Mississippi historic plaque recognizing Joseph Bullen, the church's founder, is located east of the settlement.

The Bethlehem Baptist Church was organized in Cannonsburg in 1860, and served the community's freed blacks and ex-slaves. The Church held a prominent position in Jefferson County's social, religious, and civic life. During the 1960s, the church held the first civil rights mass meeting in Jefferson County.

Cannonsburg was a stop on the Natchez, Jackson and Columbus Railroad, which began operating in the 1870s.

By 1891, Cannonsburg had a post office and a population of 31. The post office has since closed.

An oil field known at the Cannonsburg Field is located north of the settlement.
