= Louisiana Highway 42 =

State highway in Louisiana, United States

Louisiana Highway 42

Route information
- Maintained by Louisiana DOTD
- Length: 47.8 mi (76.9 km)
- Existed: 1955 renumbering–present

Major junctions
- West end: US 61 in Prairieville
- East end: LA 22 in Springfield

Location
- Country: United States
- State: Louisiana
- Parishes: East Baton Rouge, Ascension, Livingston, Tangipahoa

Highway system
- Louisiana State Highway System; Interstate; US; State; Scenic
← LA 41	→ LA 43

Louisiana Highway 42 (LA 42) is a state highway in Louisiana that serves East Baton Rouge, Ascension, Livingston, and Tangipahoa parishes. It spans 47.8 miles (76.9 km) in a general east–west direction.

== Route description ==
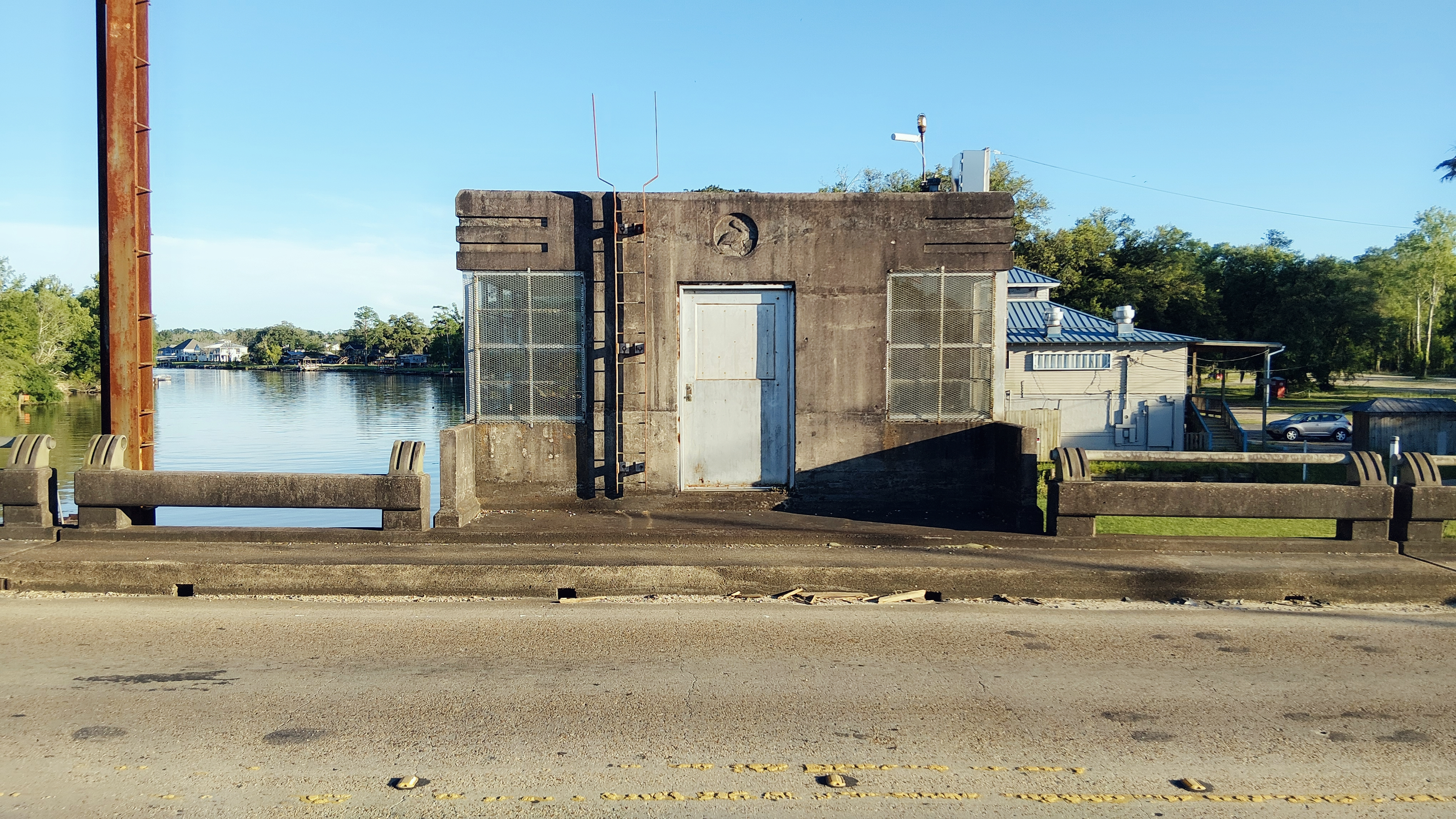
Bridge over the Amite River at Port Vincent on the boundary between Livingston and Ascension Parish

From the west, LA 42 starts at an intersection with LA 30 in Baton Rouge near Louisiana State University. It is a four-lane divided highway for 7.6 miles (12.2 km) from LA 30 eastward to an intersection with Highland Road and Siegen Lane in southeastern Baton Rouge. This section is named Burbank Drive.

From this intersection, LA 42 turns east and follows Highland Road to US 61 (Airline Highway). In this segment, it passes the Highland Road Park and Observatory and the Louisiana Country Club. Curving to the northeast, LA 42 widens to four lanes and passes through an interchange with I-10 (exit 166).

LA 42 turns southeast and overlaps US 61 out of East Baton Rouge Parish and into Ascension Parish for 3.3 miles (5.3 km). At this point, LA 42 turns eastward and meanders its way across the Amite River and into Livingston Parish, intersecting LA 16 at Port Vincent. For the next 3.1 miles (5.0 km), LA 42 and LA 16 run concurrently into the north end of French Settlement. LA 42 proceeds eastward through rural Livingston Parish until reaching its terminus at LA 22 in the town of Springfield. In 2023, the portion west of US 61 was removed from the state highway system and transferred to local control.

== Future ==
- Burbank Road Widening Project - Complete Baton Rouge Green Light Project
- LA42 Widening Project - Ascension Parish Louisiana. Louisiana DOTD LA42 Project

== Major intersections ==
Parish	Location	mi	km	Destinations	Notes
Ascension	Prairieville	0.0	0.0	US 61 north (Airline Highway); LA 948 (Highland Road)	West end of US 61 concurrency; western terminus of LA 948
Ascension		14.9	24.0	LA 427 (Perkins Road)	
Ascension	Oak Grove	15.9	25.6	US 61 south (Airline Highway)	East end of US 61 concurrency
Ascension	Oak Grove	16.0	25.7	LA 73 (Jefferson Highway)	
Ascension	Little Prairie	19.2	30.9	LA 44	Western terminus of LA 44
Ascension		22.8	36.7	LA 933	Eastern terminus of LA 933
Ascension		24.1	38.8	LA 431	Northern terminus of LA 431
Ascension–Livingston parish line	Port Vincent	24.2	38.9	Bridge over Amite River	
Livingston	Port Vincent	24.4	39.3	LA 16 west – Denham Springs	West end of LA 16 concurrency
Livingston	French Settlement	27.5	44.3	LA 16 east – French Settlement	East end of LA 16 concurrency
Livingston	Frost	35.0	56.3	LA 63 north – Livingston	
Livingston		41.9	67.4	LA 441 north – Holden	Southern terminus of LA 441
Livingston		46.8	75.3	LA 43 north – Albany	Southern terminus of LA 43
Livingston	Springfield	47.8	76.9	LA 22 – Ponchatoula; LA 1037	Eastern terminus
1.000 mi = 1.609 km; 1.000 km = 0.621 mi: Concurrency terminus
