= Acme, Louisiana =

- Unincorporated community
- Location within Louisiana Location within the United States
- Coordinates: 31°17′09″N 91°49′13″W
- Country: United States
- State: Louisiana
- Parish: Concordia
- Elevation: 49 ft (15 m)
- Time zone: UTC-6 (Central (CST))
  - Summer (DST): UTC-5 (CDT)
- ZIP code: 71316
- Area code: 318
- GNIS feature ID: 541042

Acme is an unincorporated community in Concordia Parish, Louisiana, United States. Its ZIP code is 71316.

== History ==
Acme was named for its lofty elevation. Acme is derived from Greek, meaning "high point".
