= Acy, Louisiana =

Acy
- Unincorporated community
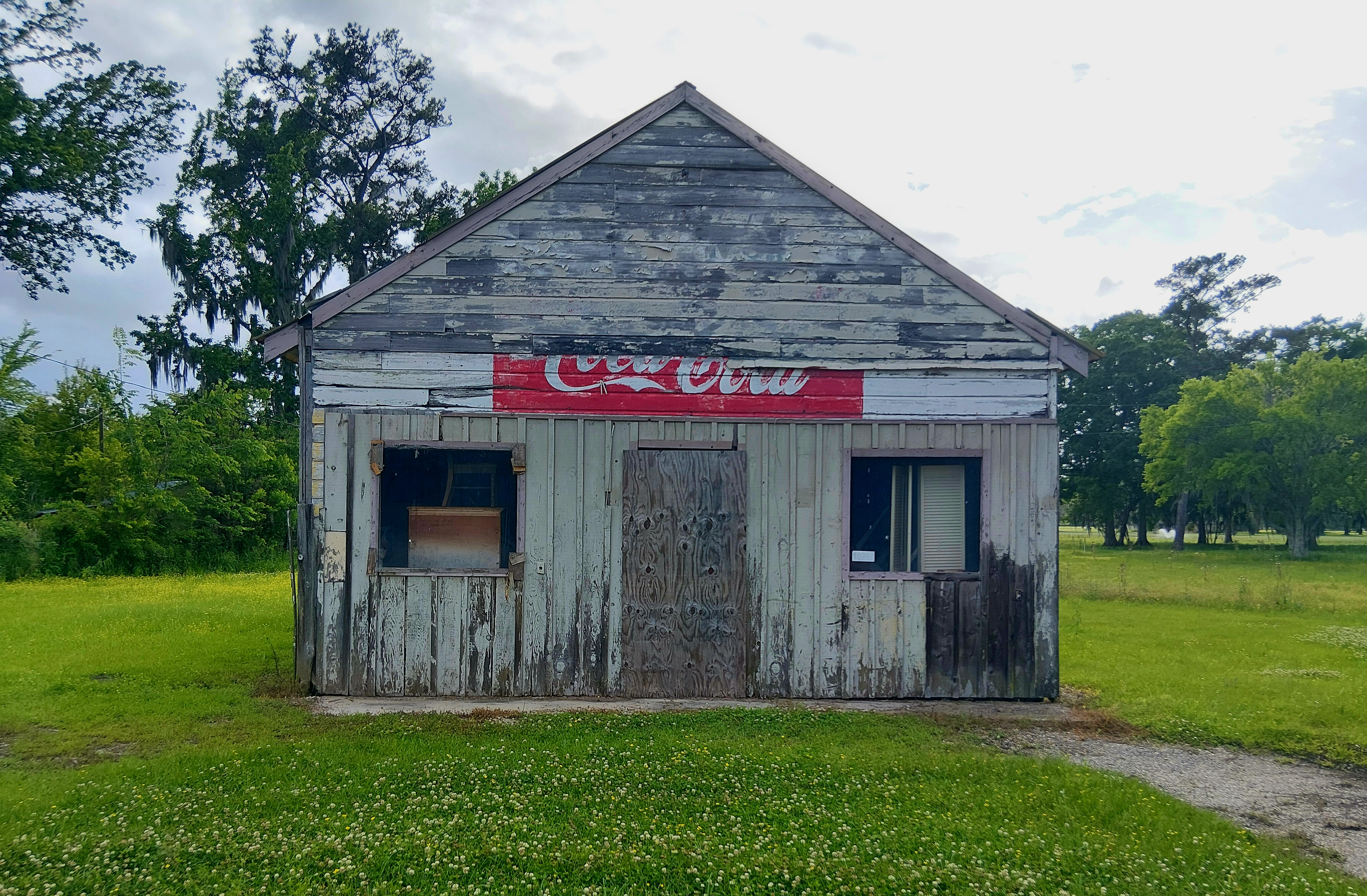
- Abandoned corner store on Louisiana Highway 22 in Acy, Louisiana

- Location of Acy in Louisiana
- Coordinates: 30°13′08″N 90°49′13″W
- Country: United States
- State: Louisiana
- Parish: Ascension
- Time zone: UTC-6 (CST)
  - Summer (DST): UTC-5 (CDT)
- Postal code: 70774
- Area code: 225

Acy is an unincorporated community in the southeastern part of Louisiana, United States. Acy is located approximately 24 miles (39 km) southeast of Baton Rouge and 45 miles (72 km) northwest of New Orleans on Louisiana Highway 22 in the parish of Ascension. The residents live along highways LA22, LA936, LA937, and many short parish side roads mostly named after current or past residents of the area. Acy consists of woodlands and pastures. Acy is a rural area located off a ridge surrounded by swamp lands. Its area is six miles (9.7 km) long and about one mile (1.6 km) wide.
