= New Era, Louisiana =

Unincorporated community in Louisiana

- Unincorporated community
- Location within Louisiana Location within the United States
- Coordinates: 31°22′02″N 91°49′38″W
- Country: United States
- State: Louisiana
- Parish: Concordia
- Elevation: 52 ft (16 m)
- Time zone: UTC-6 (Central (CST))
  - Summer (DST): UTC-5 (CDT)
- Area code: 318
- GNIS feature ID: 543517

New Era is an unincorporated community in Concordia Parish, Louisiana, United States. The community is located at the western edge of Concordia Parish on LA 129.

== History ==
During the Antebellum period New Era was a small town on the Black River that served as a landing for steam boats. The steam boats would offload passengers and trade with nearby settlements. It was also the site of Pleasant Cottage plantation which was burned down during the Civil War.
