= Shaw, Louisiana =

Unincorporated community in Louisiana

- Unincorporated community
- Location within Louisiana Location within the United States
- Coordinates: 31°11′30″N 91°37′52″W
- Country: United States
- State: Louisiana
- Parish: Concordia
- Elevation: 56 ft (17 m)
- Time zone: UTC-6 (Central (CST))
  - Summer (DST): UTC-5 (CDT)
- Area code: 318
- GNIS feature ID: 543660

Shaw is an unincorporated community in Concordia Parish, Louisiana, United States.
