= Clayton, Louisiana =

- Town
- Town of Clayton
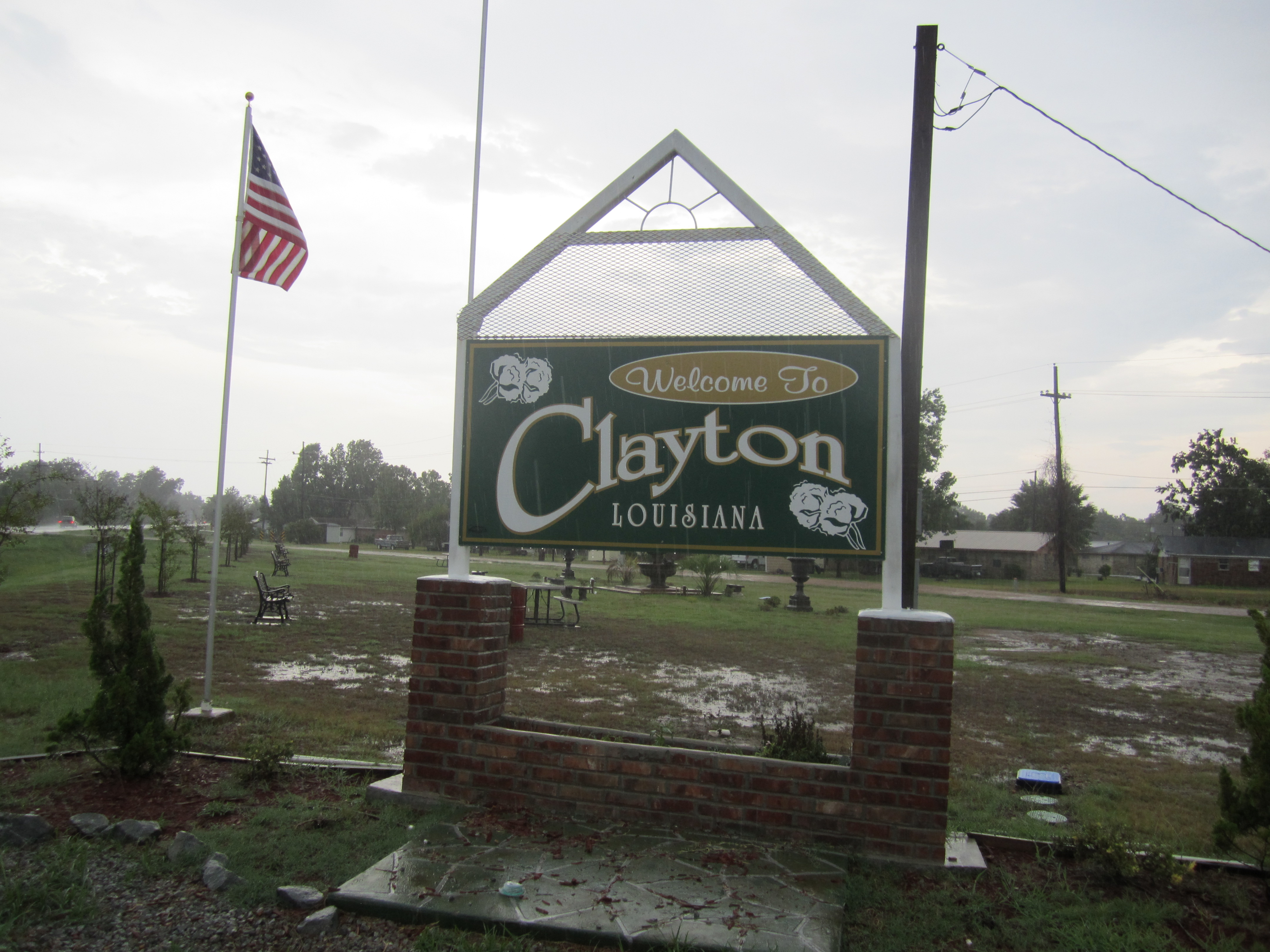
- Clayton welcome sign

- Location of Clayton in Concordia Parish, Louisiana.

- Location of Louisiana in the United States
- Coordinates: 31°43′21″N 91°32′14″W
- Country: United States
- State: Louisiana
- Parish: Concordia

Area
  - Total: 1.63 sq mi (4.23 km^{2})
  - Land: 1.58 sq mi (4.10 km^{2})
  - Water: 0.054 sq mi (0.14 km^{2})
- Elevation: 59 ft (18 m)

Population (2020)
  - Total: 584
  - Density: 369.2/sq mi (142.55/km^{2})
- Time zone: UTC-6 (CST)
  - Summer (DST): UTC-5 (CDT)
- Area code: 318
- FIPS code: 22-15850
- GNIS feature ID: 2406275

Clayton is a town in northern Concordia Parish, Louisiana, United States. As of the 2020 census, Clayton had a population of 584. Cotton is a principal commodity in the area. Clayton is located on the Tensas River, important for fishing and boating, promoted through a U.S. Army Corps of Engineers-maintained boat launch. The Tensas River merges with the Black River in Jonesville in Catahoula Parish.

Louisiana State Representative Andy Anders is from Clayton and Ferriday.

A major employer in the town was Clayton Gin Company which closed in the early 2000s and was mostly demolished in the early 2010s. The Clayton Gin was originally constructed in the 1940s by W. Howard Davis and his brother Doyle E. Davis. The gin operated under the name "Davis Bros. Gin Co.". The last surviving brother, Howard Davis, died in 1972 and the gin continued to operate under the management of his son-in-law Sam D. Cole until his death in 1979. The gin was sold in the early 1980s and continued operation as the "Clayton Gin Company" until the early 2000s.

== Geography ==
Clayton is located in northern Concordia Parish along the south bank of the Tensas River. Catahoula Parish is to the north across the river. U.S. Route 425 passes through the center of the town, leading north 36 miles (58 km) to Winnsboro and south 6 miles (10 km) to Ferriday and 18 miles (29 km) to Natchez, Mississippi. U.S. Route 65 has its southern terminus in Clayton; it leads north 56 miles (90 km) to Tallulah and 998 miles (1,606 km) to its northern terminus in Minnesota.

According to the United States Census Bureau, the town has a total area of 1.63 square miles (4.23 km^{2}), of which 1.58 square miles (4.10 km^{2}) is land and 0.05 square miles (0.14 km^{2}), or 3.24%, is water.

== Demographics ==
Historical population
Census	Pop.	Note	%±
1950	657		—
1960	882		34.2%
1970	1,103		25.1%
1980	1,204		9.2%
1990	917		−23.8%
2000	858		−6.4%
2010	711		−17.1%
2020	584		−17.9%
2025 (est.)	549	▼	−6.0%
U.S. Decennial Census

=== 2020 census ===
Clayton racial composition
Race	Number	Percentage
White (non-Hispanic)	143	24.49%
Black or African American (non-Hispanic)	426	72.95%
Asian	1	0.17%
Other/Mixed	8	1.37%
Hispanic or Latino	6	1.03%

As of the 2020 United States census, there were 584 people, 189 households, and 107 families residing in the town.

=== 2000 census ===
As of the census of 2000, there were 858 people, 317 households, and 220 families residing in the town. The population density was 539.4 inhabitants per square mile (208.3/km^{2}). There were 361 housing units at an average density of 226.9 per square mile (87.6/km^{2}). The racial makeup of the town was 31.70% White, 67.25% African American, and 1.05% from two or more races. Hispanic or Latino of any race were 0.47% of the population.

There were 317 households, out of which 34.1% had children under the age of 18 living with them, 32.8% were married couples living together, 31.9% had a female householder with no husband present, and 30.3% were non-families. 24.9% of all households were made up of individuals, and 12.9% had someone living alone who was 65 years of age or older. The average household size was 2.71 and the average family size was 3.24.

In the town, the population was spread out, with 33.4% under the age of 18, 9.6% from 18 to 24, 21.7% from 25 to 44, 21.7% from 45 to 64, and 13.6% who were 65 years of age or older. The median age was 32 years. For every 100 females, there were 90.7 males. For every 100 females age 18 and over, there were 83.6 males.

The median income for a household in the town was $14,100, and the median income for a family was $15,598. Males had a median income of $22,250 versus $12,500 for females. The per capita income for the town was $7,955. About 38.9% of families and 45.3% of the population were below the poverty line, including 59.0% of those under age 18 and 34.9% of those age 65 or over.

== Photo gallery ==
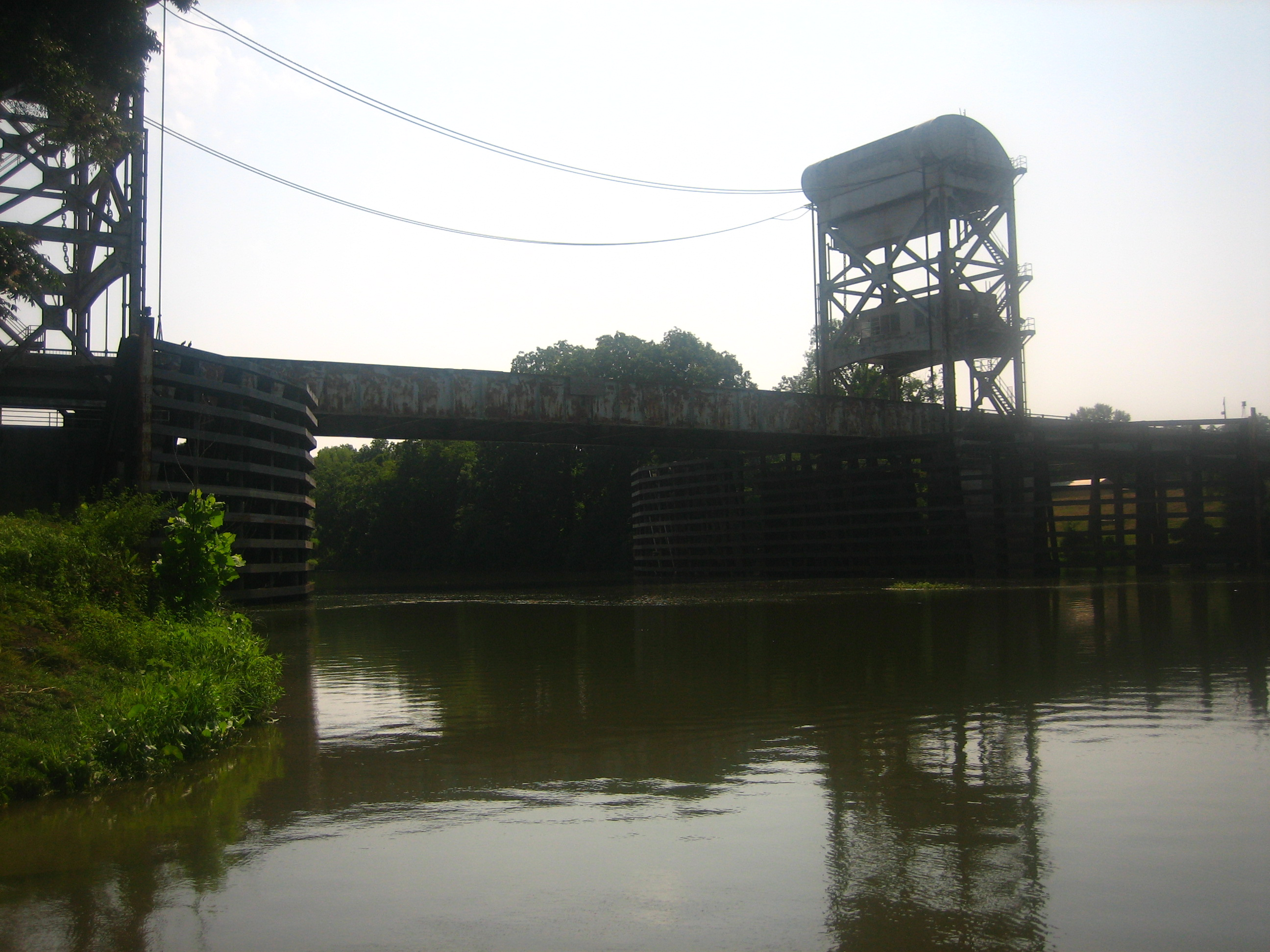
The Tensas River at Clayton, Louisiana

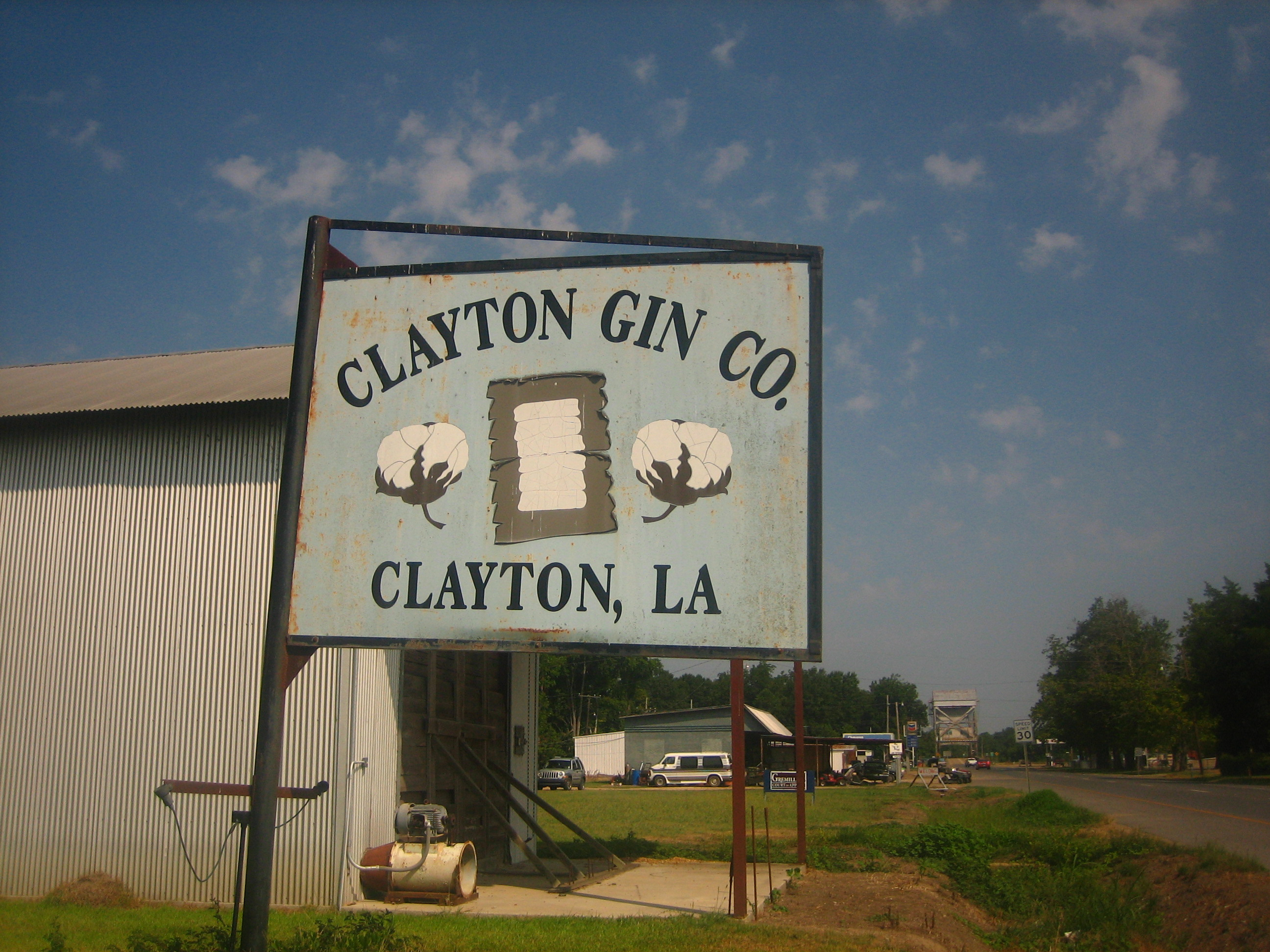
Clayton Cotton Gin
