= Louisiana Highway 30 =

State highway in Louisiana, United States

Louisiana Highway 30

- Route of LA 30 highlighted in red

Route information
- Maintained by Louisiana DOTD
- Length: 28.102 mi (45.226 km)
- Existed: 1955 renumbering–present
- Tourist routes: National Scenic Byways: Great River Road

Major junctions
- Northwest end: LA 73 in Baton Rouge
- I-10 in Baton Rouge; LA 42 in Baton Rouge; LA 74 in St. Gabriel; LA 73 northeast of Geismar; I-10 in Gonzales; LA 44 in Gonzales
- Southeast end: US 61 / LA 431 east of Gonzales

Location
- Country: United States
- State: Louisiana
- Parishes: East Baton Rouge, Iberville, Ascension

Highway system
- Louisiana State Highway System; Interstate; US; State; Scenic
← LA 29	→ LA 31
← SR 62	SR 63	→ SR 64

Louisiana Highway 30 (LA 30) is a state highway located in southeastern Louisiana. It runs 28.10 miles (45.22 km) in a northwest to southeast direction from LA 73 in Baton Rouge to the junction of U.S. Highway 61 (US 61) and LA 431 east of Gonzales.

The route connects Downtown Baton Rouge with Louisiana State University and travels through the western portion of the campus. Known as Nicholson Drive, this section of LA 30 is a divided four-lane thoroughfare that provides access to many of the school's sports facilities, most notably Tiger Stadium, one of the largest stadiums by capacity in the world.

South of the Baton Rouge area, LA 30 cuts across several sharp bends in the Mississippi River. While passing through the rural city of St. Gabriel, its general direction changes from north–south to east–west. The highway then connects a string of chemical plants in the Geismar area to junctions with Interstate 10 (I-10) in Gonzales and US 61 at Brittany.

LA 30 was designated in the 1955 Louisiana Highway renumbering, replacing the former State Route 63. The highway initially followed little of its current route, traveling more closely along the Mississippi River southward from Gardere to a different terminus at Darrow. The current alignment, an extension of Baton Rouge's Nicholson Drive, was constructed in stages during the 1960s. Other state highway designations, primarily LA 75, were subsequently extended over portions of the original alignment.

== Route description ==
=== Baton Rouge and LSU ===
From the northwest, LA 30 begins at a junction with LA 73 (Government Street) in Downtown Baton Rouge just three blocks from the Mississippi River. The route heads south briefly on the undivided two-lane St. Louis Street. After four blocks, the roadway crosses underneath I-10 at exit 155A and transitions onto the divided four-lane thoroughfare of Nicholson Drive. A ramp connects northbound St. Louis Street with I-10 west to Lafayette, and another leads from I-10 east onto Nicholson Drive in both directions.

South of the downtown area, LA 30 cuts through the campus of Louisiana State University and passes closely by Tiger Stadium. Shortly afterward, the highway begins to follow alongside the Canadian National Railway (CN) line while passing Alex Box Stadium/Skip Bertman Field. It then intersects LA 42 (Burbank Drive), which connects to I-10 at the Blue Bayou and Dixie Landin' amusement parks. South of the LSU campus, the surroundings become more rural in character, and LA 30 narrows to an undivided two-lane highway. In an area known as Gardere, the route crosses LA 327 Spur (Gardere Lane), which leads to the nearby L'Auberge Casino and Hotel on the Mississippi River. Shortly afterward is an intersection with LA 1248 (Bluebonnet Boulevard), connecting to I-10 and the Mall of Louisiana.

=== St. Gabriel and Gonzales ===
Continuing southward, LA 30 simultaneously crosses from unincorporated East Baton Rouge Parish into the Iberville Parish city of St. Gabriel. There is little change in the surroundings, as the city limits encompass scattered rural communities, prison facilities, and industrial plants. Several formerly independent communities, such as Carville and Sunshine are still identified on the directional highway signs. In the center of town, LA 30 passes the local high school and intersects LA 74, which leads through Dutchtown to another connection with the interstate. LA 30 curves southeast away from the CN rail line and proceeds through a small industrial corridor before crossing out of St. Gabriel and into unincorporated Ascension Parish.

LA 30 gains a center turning lane and crosses LA 73 near Geismar. The route then curves due east and maintains this trajectory for the rest of its journey. Just beyond LA 3251 (Ashland Road), LA 30 enters the city of Gonzales and passes through a diamond interchange with I-10 at exit 177, connecting with Baton Rouge and New Orleans. The highway becomes a partially developed commercial corridor between I-10 and LA 44 (South Burnside Avenue). It then narrows to two lanes once more and passes through scattered residential development until reaching its terminus at US 61 (Airline Highway) in an area known as Brittany. From this junction, located between Gonzales and Sorrento, LA 431 continues the path of LA 30 and turns northward toward Port Vincent.

=== Route classification and data ===
LA 30 is classified by the Louisiana Department of Transportation and Development (La DOTD) as an urban minor arterial for most of its length. At either end—within the city of Baton Rouge and east of I-10 in Gonzales—it is considered an urban principal arterial. Daily traffic volume in 2013 peaked at 29,900 vehicles within and just north of the LSU campus. Another high figure of 22,100 was recorded near I-10 in Gonzales. The remainder of the route generally averaged less than 12,000 vehicles per day. The posted speed limit is 55 mph (90 km/h) for most of the route but is reduced to 45 or 35 mph (70 or 55 km/h) in developed areas.

The portion of LA 30 from Downtown Baton Rouge to the LSU campus serves as a small link in the Great River Road, which is designated as a National Scenic Byway.

== History ==
=== Pre-1955 route numbering ===
State Route 63
- Location: Baton Rouge–Darrow
- Length: 26.4 mi (42.5 km)
- Existed: 1921–1955

The Louisiana Highway Commission and the state's first system of numbered highways were created in 1921. At that time, the main road traveling from Downtown Baton Rouge through what would soon become the new campus of Louisiana State University was Highland Road, which was designated as part of State Route 63.

Route 63. Beginning at Baton Rouge via Agricultural College, Burtville, through Grenada cut off at Plaquemine, thence from Grenada lane, down, via St. Gabriel, through Island Cut Off to Jefferson Highway in Ascension Parish.

— 1926 revised legislative route description

Over the next few decades, the state highway department would gradually replace this and other points of access to LSU with newer and wider thoroughfares. In 1937, the first section of Nicholson Drive was completed, running parallel to Highland Road from South Boulevard to LSU's Tiger Stadium. This new road was not incorporated into Route 63 but was instead designated as Route C-1458. The southern end of Nicholson Drive initially connected with the older Highland Road via South Stadium and South Campus Drives, but a smoother connection known as Nicholson Drive Extension was opened by the late 1940s.

The remainder of Route 63 likewise followed older, parallel roadways to the modern LA 30 until reaching Ascension Parish, where it proceeded to a very different terminus. South of LSU, Route 63 turned southwest from Highland Road onto Gardere Lane (now LA 327 Spur) to the Mississippi River. It then followed the current routes of LA 327 and LA 75 to Geismar, generally following the river levee but cutting across some of its sharper bends. The pre-1955 State Route 1 continued the route downriver from Geismar toward Darrow and also branched northeast from the river toward Prairieville. This terminus was once a major junction, as Route 1 (known as the Jefferson Highway) carried through traffic between New Orleans and Baton Rouge as part of US 61 until the Airline Highway was opened in 1933.

=== 1955 renumbering ===
The Louisiana Department of Highways, the successor to the Louisiana Highway Commission, renumbered the state highway system in 1955. LA 30 was designated to replace the former Route 63, whose number was reused for an unrelated route to the northeast. Small extensions to the route were also made at either end.

La 30—From a junction with La-US 61 Business Route at or near Baton Rouge through or near Burtville, St. Gabriel, Carville and Geismar to a junction with La 22 at or near Darrow.

— 1955 legislative route description

LA 30 now took advantage of the Nicholson Drive alignment that the old Route 63 had never incorporated. Initially, it also extended further into Downtown Baton Rouge and intersected US 61 Bus. (and the concurrent US 190 Bus.). This junction was initially located at Florida Boulevard and Acadian Thruway but was moved several blocks west in 1957 when the business route was re-routed onto the first completed portion of the Baton Rouge Expressway (now I-110). From there, LA 30 headed west on Florida Boulevard toward the Mississippi River then turned south onto Lafayette Street (northbound via 3rd Street) and made a zigzag at the Old State Capitol onto St. Phillip Street to reach Government Street. By 1960, the terminus had changed again as US 61/190 Bus. was moved onto its current route following River Road after improvements to that thoroughfare were completed. LA 30 now headed south on River Road from Florida Boulevard to Government Street rather than the one-way pair of Lafayette and 3rd Streets. The current terminus at Government Street was put into effect in recent years when this portion of River Road was transferred to the city of Baton Rouge.

On the opposite end, LA 30 took over the portion of former Route 1 along the Mississippi River from Geismar to Darrow. Here, LA 22 crossed the river by ferry to Donaldsonville until 1965, a year after the Sunshine Bridge was completed.

=== Subsequent realignments ===
In the early 1960s, the current alignment of LA 30 was opened from LSU to Gardere Lane. The new roadway was an extension of Nicholson Drive, but it did not continue from the earlier Nicholson Drive Extension, which is still signed by that name in the field. It traveled instead on a new path alongside the Illinois Central Railroad line (now the Canadian National). This alignment was formerly labeled on the official state highway maps as Arlington Road but is now signed throughout East Baton Rouge Parish as part of Nicholson Drive. The old alignment following Highland Road became part of LA 42 until that designation was moved onto the newly constructed Burbank Drive in the 1990s.

Around 1965, the new alignment of LA 30 was extended from Gardere Lane to LA 74 in St. Gabriel. The present highway designations absorbed the old route along Gardere Lane and the River Road at this time. The new alignment of LA 30 was completed to LA 44 in Gonzales by 1970. It tied in there with an existing road that was part of LA 431. The designation of LA 30 then replaced that of LA 431 eastward from LA 44 to the junction with US 61.

In March 2015, a slight change to the route of LA 30 occurred when St. Louis Street was converted to a two-way street as part of Baton Rouge's Downtown Two-Way Project. The project was designed to facilitate access to nearby parking garages and improve the connection between the downtown area and the LSU campus. St. Louis Street previously formed a one-way pair with St. Philip Street, which is now internally designated as LA 30 Spur.

== Future ==
La DOTD is currently engaged in a program that aims to transfer about 5,000 miles (8,000 km) of state-owned roadways to local governments over the next several years. Under this plan of "right-sizing" the state highway system, the northwestern portion of LA 30 between Baton Rouge and Gardere is proposed for deletion as it no longer meets a significant interurban travel function.

== Major intersections ==
Parish	Location	mi	km	Destinations	Notes
East Baton Rouge	Baton Rouge	0.000	0.000	LA 73 (Government Street) to I-10	Western terminus
East Baton Rouge	Baton Rouge	0.146– 0.458	0.235– 0.737	I-10 west – Port Allen, Lafayette	Access from northbound LA 30 to I-10 west and from I-10 east to LA 30 both directions
East Baton Rouge	Baton Rouge	0.331	0.533	LA 30 Spur (St. Philip Street)	Southern terminus of LA 30 Spur (not signed); one-way southbound
East Baton Rouge	Baton Rouge	2.228	3.586	LA 327 (Skip Bertman Drive)	Northern terminus of LA 327
East Baton Rouge	Baton Rouge	2.725	4.385	LA 42 (Burbank Drive)	Western terminus of LA 42
East Baton Rouge	Gardere	7.530	12.118	LA 327 Spur (Gardere Lane)	To L'Auberge Hotel and Casino
East Baton Rouge		8.264	13.300	LA 1248 north (Bluebonnet Boulevard)	Southern terminus of LA 1248
Iberville	St. Gabriel	14.092	22.679	LA 74 – Carville, Sunshine, Dutchtown	
Iberville	St. Gabriel	17.247	27.756	LA 3115	
Ascension		20.384	32.805	LA 73 – Geismar, Carville, Dutchtown	
Ascension		23.270	37.449	LA 3251 (Ashland Road)	Northern terminus of LA 3251
Ascension	Gonzales	24.033– 24.315	38.677– 39.131	I-10 – Baton Rouge, New Orleans	Exit 177 on I-10
Ascension	Gonzales	25.771	41.474	LA 44 (South Burnside Avenue)	
Ascension		27.804	44.746	LA 941	Northern terminus of LA 941
Ascension	Brittany	28.102	45.226	US 61 (Airline Highway) – Baton Rouge, New Orleans LA 431 north – Port Vincent, Denham Springs	Eastern terminus of LA 30; southern terminus of LA 431
1.000 mi = 1.609 km; 1.000 km = 0.621 mi: Incomplete access

== Spur route ==
Louisiana Highway 30 Spur
- Location: Baton Rouge
- Length: 0.353 mi (568 m)
- Existed: 2015–present

Louisiana Highway 30 Spur (LA 30 Spur) runs 0.35 miles (0.56 km) from LA 73 to mainline LA 30 in Baton Rouge.

The route consists of an unsigned state-maintained portion of St. Philip Street that carries one-way traffic in a southbound direction. It was formerly part of a one-way pair with St. Louis Street and served as the southbound lanes of mainline LA 30 until that thoroughfare was converted to a two-way street in March 2015. Both the spur and the entirety of its parent route within the Baton Rouge city limits are under an agreement to be transferred to local control as of January 2017.

The entire highway is in Baton Rouge, East Baton Rouge Parish.

mi	km	Destinations	Notes
0.000	0.000	LA 73 (Government Street)	Northern terminus
0.353	0.568	LA 30 (Nicholson Drive)	Southern terminus
1.000 mi = 1.609 km; 1.000 km = 0.621 mi
