= Louisiana Highway 74 =

State highway in Louisiana, United States

Louisiana Highway 74

Route information
- Maintained by Louisiana DOTD
- Length: 10.67 mi (17.17 km)
- Existed: 1955 renumbering–present

Major junctions
- West end: LA 75 in St. Gabriel
- LA 30 in St. Gabriel; LA 73 in Dutchtown
- East end: US 61 north of Gonzales

Location
- Country: United States
- State: Louisiana
- Parishes: Iberville, Ascension

Highway system
- Louisiana State Highway System; Interstate; US; State; Scenic
← LA 73	→ LA 75

Louisiana Highway 74 (LA 74) is a state highway located in southeastern Louisiana. It runs 10.67 miles (17.17 km) in an east–west direction from LA 75 in St. Gabriel to U.S. Highway 61 (US 61) north of Gonzales.

Much of LA 74 traverses a string of newer residential subdivisions growing out of the Baton Rouge metropolitan area. The route roughly parallels LA 30 for its entire distance. LA 30 and LA 74 terminate at opposite ends of Gonzales with neither highway running directly into the center of town. However, LA 30 provides access to Interstate 10 (I-10), connecting to Baton Rouge and New Orleans, whereas LA 74 does not.

== Route description ==
From the west, LA 74 begins at an intersection with LA 75 in St. Gabriel, a small city in eastern Iberville Parish. LA 75 follows the east bank levee of the Mississippi River, heading toward Carville on the south and connecting with the Plaquemine Ferry via Sunshine on the north. LA 74 proceeds east and crosses the Canadian National Railway (CN) tracks at grade. Immediately afterward, it intersects LA 30, which connects to Baton Rouge on the north. LA 30 also parallels LA 74 toward Gonzales and provides access to I-10.

LA 74 proceeds eastward through a narrow strip of residential development, and after 1.1 miles (1.8 km), passes by the entrance to the Elayn Hunt Correctional Center, the state's second largest prison. 0.6 miles (0.97 km) later, the surroundings abruptly change to an uninhabited and thickly forested area. At the same time, LA 74 curves to the southeast and continues for 1.6 miles (2.6 km) before intersecting LA 3115, which runs alongside the petrochemical facilities between LA 30 and the Mississippi River. Immediately afterward, LA 74 exits the St. Gabriel city limits, simultaneously crossing from Iberville Parish into Ascension Parish.

In Ascension Parish, LA 74 makes a slight dip to the south before resuming an eastward course at an intersection with LA 928 (Bluff Road). Here, LA 74 begins to pass through a succession of small residential subdivisions in an unincorporated area known as Dutchtown. 1.3 miles (2.1 km) east of LA 928, LA 74 reaches the main junction of Dutchtown, an intersection with LA 73 (Old Jefferson Highway). Signage directs motorists north onto LA 73 to reach the nearest interchange with I-10. After 0.7 miles (1.1 km), LA 74 crosses over I-10 without intersecting it.

East of I-10, the residential development becomes slightly more sparse. 1.8 miles (2.9 km) past the overpass, LA 74 intersects LA 938 (Coon Trap Road), which zigzags in a general southeastern direction into the center of Gonzales. 0.6 miles (0.97 km) later, LA 74 curves to the northeast and crosses the Kansas City Southern Railway (KCS) tracks. Shortly afterward, the route ends at an intersection with US 61 (Airline Highway) at a point just north of Gonzales. US 61 parallels I-10 between Baton Rouge to the northwest and New Orleans to the southeast.

The route is classified by the Louisiana Department of Transportation and Development (La DOTD) as a rural minor collector from the western terminus to LA 30, an urban collector from LA 30 to LA 73, and an urban minor arterial from LA 73 to the eastern terminus. Average daily traffic volume in 2013 is reported as 4,900 vehicles within St. Gabriel, increasing to 11,800 between the city limits and LA 73. The traffic count then decreases to 9,600 and finally to 7,900 east of LA 938. The posted speed limit is 30 mph (50 km/h) within the populated section of St. Gabriel, increasing to 55 mph (90 km/h) to the I-10 overpass, after which it is slightly decreased to 50 mph (80 km/h) for the remainder of the route. LA 74 is an undivided, two-lane highway for its entire length.

== History ==
In the original Louisiana Highway system in use between 1921 and 1955, the modern LA 74 was part of four separate state highways. State Route 179 followed the route from the western terminus to LA 928, where it turned north toward Prairieville. State Route 760 acted as a short connector from there to the present LA 73, where State Route 525 picked up the route and continued into the center of Gonzales via the present LA 938. The above three routes were designated by the state legislature between 1928 and 1930. The short easternmost segment of the present LA 74 continuing due east from LA 938 to US 61 was constructed around the early 1940s and designated by the state highway department as State Route C-1551.

LA 74 was created in the 1955 Louisiana Highway renumbering, a major goal of which was to reduce the number of highway designations between two points.

La 74—From a junction with La 30 at or near St. Gabriel through or near Dutchtown to a junction with La-US 61 at or near Gonzales.

— 1955 legislative route description

With the renumbering, the existing highway between St. Gabriel and Gonzales, a continuous road with no turns, now followed a single route number. The route of LA 74 has remained the same to the present day, although the western terminus was originally a junction with LA 30, which followed the River Road through St. Gabriel. In the mid-1960s, LA 30 was relocated onto its current alignment alongside the Illinois Central (now the Canadian National) railroad tracks. LA 75 was then extended across the Mississippi River via the Plaquemine Ferry to cover the former route of LA 30, becoming the new western terminus of LA 74.

== Future ==
La DOTD is currently engaged in a program that aims to transfer about 5,000 miles (8,000 km) of state-owned roadways to local governments over the next several years. Under this plan of "right-sizing" the state highway system, virtually the entire route of LA 74 is proposed for deletion as it does not meet a significant interurban travel function. Only the western 0.3 miles (0.48 km) of the route is to be retained as a connector between LA 75 and LA 30.

== Major intersections ==
Parish	Location	mi	km	Destinations	Notes
Iberville	St. Gabriel	0.0	0.0	LA 75 – Carville, Sunshine, Plaquemine Ferry	Western terminus
Iberville	St. Gabriel	0.3	0.48	LA 30 – Baton Rouge	
Iberville	St. Gabriel	3.6	5.8	LA 3115	Northern terminus of LA 3115
Ascension		5.8	9.3	LA 928 north (Bluff Road)	Southern terminus of LA 928
Ascension	Dutchtown	7.1	11.4	LA 73 north (Old Jefferson Highway) to I-10 – Baton Rouge LA 73 south (Old Jefferson Highway) – Geismar, Carville	
Ascension		9.7	15.6	LA 938 (Coon Trap Road)	Western terminus of LA 938
Ascension		10.7	17.2	US 61 (Airline Highway) – New Orleans, Baton Rouge	Eastern terminus
1.000 mi = 1.609 km; 1.000 km = 0.621 mi
