= Louisiana Highway 75 =

State highway in Louisiana, United States

Louisiana Highway 75

- Route of LA 75 highlighted in red

Route information
- Maintained by Louisiana DOTD
- Length: 46.860 mi (75.414 km)
- Existed: 1955 renumbering–present
- Tourist routes: National Scenic Byway: Great River Road

Major junctions
- West end: Dead end in Bayou Pigeon
- LA 1 in Plaquemine; LA 74 in St. Gabriel; LA 73 in Geismar
- East end: LA 22 / LA 942 in Darrow

Location
- Country: United States
- State: Louisiana
- Parishes: Iberville, Ascension

Highway system
- Louisiana State Highway System; Interstate; US; State; Scenic
← LA 74	→ LA 76

Louisiana Highway 75 (LA 75) is a state highway located in southeastern Louisiana. It runs 46.86 miles (75.41 km) in a general east–west direction from a dead end in Bayou Pigeon to the junction of LA 22 and LA 942 in Darrow.

The route makes a semi-circle through Iberville and Ascension parishes. About halfway along the way, it passes through the city of Plaquemine and crosses the Mississippi River via ferry. LA 75 travels through a variety of surroundings, ranging from remote swampland along the Grand River on its western end to a mixture of rural farmland and petrochemical plants along the Mississippi River on its eastern end. Major junctions include LA 1 in Plaquemine, the main route connecting the communities situated along the west bank of the Mississippi River. After crossing the river, intersections with LA 74, LA 73, and LA 22 provide connections to the parallel Interstate 10 (I-10) and U.S. Highway 61 (US 61).

LA 75 was designated in the 1955 Louisiana Highway renumbering and initially followed a more distinct north–south route through Iberville Parish. It replaced several shorter former routes, including State Route 1003 south of Bayou Sorrel; State Route 254 from Bayou Sorrel through Plaquemine; and State Route 1002 from Plaquemine to Sunshine, a community now within the St. Gabriel city limits. The designation was later extended to cover the portion of LA 30 from Sunshine to Darrow given up when that highway was re-routed during the late 1960s.

== Route description ==
From the west, LA 75 begins at a dead end in the Iberville Parish community of Bayou Pigeon. This point is located just southwest of a junction with LA 997, which leads to Morgan City. LA 75 travels northward as an undivided two-lane highway along the east bank of the Lower Grand River. The route intersects LA 404 at Choctaw, connecting with the town of White Castle. After passing through the community of Bayou Sorrel, LA 75 turns northeast at LA 3066 onto Belleview Road, heading away from the Grand River.

Upon entering the city of Plaquemine, LA 75 widens to an undivided four-lane highway with a center turning lane. After crossing the Union Pacific Railroad (UP) tracks at grade, LA 75 intersects LA 1, which follows the one-way couplet of Church and Eden Streets through town. Narrowing to two-lane capacity once again, LA 75 makes a zigzag across the Mississippi River levee and crosses the river via the Plaquemine Ferry, a service that operates every half-hour. Upon reaching the east bank levee, LA 75 has a Y-junction with LA 991 (River Road). LA 75 curves eastward to follow alongside the levee, continuing the route of LA 991 downriver.

LA 75 crosses into the rural city of St. Gabriel at a junction with LA 327 (Gummers Lane). The highway passes through Sunshine, a small community now within the city limits, and bends southward with the river levee. A junction with LA 74 connects with the parallel LA 30 and with Gonzales to the east. LA 75 cuts across a sharp bend in the Mississippi River known as Point Clair and rejoins the river levee at Carville, another community within St. Gabriel.

After intersecting LA 3115, LA 75 crosses into Ascension Parish and simultaneously exits the St. Gabriel city limits. The highway curves southward with the Mississippi River as petrochemical facilities begin to dominate the landscape. At Geismar, LA 75 intersects LA 73, connecting with Dutchtown. The highway turns eastward, following a sharp bend in the river, and ends soon afterward at a junction with LA 22 in Darrow. The roadway continues straight ahead along the river as LA 942.

=== Route classification and data ===
LA 75 has several different classifications by the Louisiana Department of Transportation and Development (La DOTD) over the course of its route. It generally functions as a rural major collector between Choctaw and Plaquemine, an urban minor arterial through Plaquemine, and a rural minor collector otherwise. Daily traffic volume in 2013 peaked at 13,000 vehicles in Plaquemine and tapered off to below 1,500 vehicles through some of the more rural areas. The posted speed limit ranges from 30 to 45 mph (50 to 70 km/h) within the city of Plaquemine and increases to 55 mph (90 km/h) in most rural areas.

The portion of LA 75 extending from the Plaquemine Ferry to Darrow is a small part of the multi-state National Scenic Byway known as the Great River Road.

== History ==
In the original Louisiana Highway system in use between 1921 and 1955, LA 75 was part of several different routes, including State Route 1003 from the western terminus to Bayou Sorrel; State Route 254 to Plaquemine; State Route 1002 to Sunshine; State Route 63 to Geismar; and State Route 1 to Darrow. The above highways comprising the Bayou Pigeon–Sunshine route were joined under the single designation of LA 75 when the Louisiana Department of Highways renumbered the state highway system in 1955.

La 75—From a point at or near Pigeon through or near Indian Village and Plaquemine to a junction with La 30 at or near Sunshine.

— 1955 legislative route description

The remainder of the route from Sunshine to Darrow was originally part of LA 30. Once LA 30 was moved onto its current route during the late 1960s, the bypassed River Road alignment became an extension of LA 75. This portion of highway was part of State Route 65 and State Route 1 prior to the 1955 renumbering.

The only other significant change to LA 75 occurred in 1965 when the highway was re-routed through the Plaquemine area. LA 75 originally followed what is now LA 3066, weaving into town alongside Bayou Plaquemine. This alignment was bypassed by an extension of former LA 992-2, and the Mississippi River ferry was moved downstream from its previous location at Court Street accordingly.

== Future ==
La DOTD is currently engaged in a program that aims to transfer about 5,000 miles (8,000 km) of state-owned roadways to local governments over the next several years. Under this plan of "right-sizing" the state highway system, both ends of LA 75—consisting of the portion south of LA 404 on the west end and the portion south of LA 3251 on the east end—are proposed for deletion as they no longer meet a significant interurban travel function.

== Major intersections ==
Parish	Location	mi	km	Destinations	Notes
Iberville	Bayou Pigeon	0.000	0.000	Dead end southeast of Bayou Indigo	Western terminus
Iberville	Bayou Pigeon	1.205	1.939	LA 997 (Bayou Pigeon Bridge) – Morgan City	Northern terminus of LA 997
Iberville	Choctaw	6.155	9.906	LA 404 – White Castle	Western terminus of LA 404
Iberville	Bayou Sorrel	10.400	16.737	LA 75 Spur (Bayou Sorrel Bridge)	Eastern terminus of LA 75 Spur
Iberville		16.090	25.894	LA 3066 (Bayou Road)	Western terminus of LA 3066
Iberville	Plaquemine	21.105	33.965	LA 992-3 (Tenant Road)	Western terminus of LA 992-3
Iberville	Plaquemine	22.927– 23.020	36.897– 37.047	LA 1 (Eden Street, Church Street) – White Castle, Port Allen LA 405 begins	One-way pair; northern terminus of LA 405; west end of LA 405 concurrency
Iberville	Plaquemine	23.080	37.144	LA 405 south (Belleview Road)	East end of LA 405 concurrency
Iberville	Plaquemine	23.101	37.177	LA 1251	Eastern terminus of LA 1251
Iberville	Plaquemine	23.252	37.420	Plaquemine Ferry across Mississippi River	
Iberville		23.340	37.562	LA 991 (River Road)	Southern terminus of LA 991
Iberville	St. Gabriel	26.750	43.050	LA 327 (Gummers Lane) – Baton Rouge	Southern terminus of LA 327
Iberville	St. Gabriel	30.650	49.326	LA 74 – Gonzales	Western terminus of LA 74
Iberville	St. Gabriel	32.295	51.974	LA 141-2 (Point Clair Road)	Eastern terminus of LA 141-2
Iberville	St. Gabriel	34.180	55.007	LA 141-1 (Point Clair Road)	Eastern terminus of LA 141-1; location also known as Carville
Iberville	St. Gabriel	36.400	58.580	LA 3115	Southern terminus of LA 3115
Ascension	Geismar	38.940	62.668	LA 73 – Dutchtown	Southern terminus of LA 73
Ascension		41.389	66.609	LA 3251 (Ashland Road)	Western terminus of LA 3251
Ascension	Darrow	46.860	75.414	LA 22 – Burnside, Gonzales; LA 942	Eastern terminus of LA 75; western terminus of LA 22 and LA 942
1.000 mi = 1.609 km; 1.000 km = 0.621 mi: Concurrency terminus

== Spur route ==
Louisiana Highway 75 Spur
- Location: Bayou Sorrel
- Length: 0.177 mi (285 m)
- Existed: 1964–present

Louisiana Highway 75 Spur (LA 75 Spur) runs 0.18 miles (0.29 km) in a southwest to northeast direction, consisting largely of a swing bridge across the Lower Grand River (a link in the Gulf Intracoastal Waterway) in the small Iberville Parish community of Bayou Sorrel. The route connects LA 75 with Bayou Sorrel Road, a local road that travels along the narrow strip of land between Bayou Sorrel and the Lower Grand River.

The bridge was constructed in 1964, replacing a toll ferry that operated just upstream. As is typical for the state's highway spurs, the mileage for LA 75 Spur increases from the junction with its parent route regardless of geographical direction.

Major intersections
The entire highway is in Bayou Sorrel, Iberville Parish.

mi	km	Destinations	Notes
0.177	0.285	Bayou Sorrel Road	Western terminus
0.111– 0.040	0.179– 0.064	Bridge over Lower Grand River	
0.000	0.000	LA 75 – Bayou Pigeon, Plaquemine	Eastern terminus
1.000 mi = 1.609 km; 1.000 km = 0.621 mi
