= Louisiana Highway 141 =

Highway in Louisiana

Louisiana Highway 141

Route information
- Maintained by Louisiana DOTD
- Length: 4.07 mi (6.55 km)
- Existed: 1955 renumbering–present
- Tourist routes: National Scenic Byway: Great River Road

Southern segment
- Length: 2.46 mi (3.96 km)
- South end: LA 75 in St. Gabriel
- North end: End state maintenance in St. Gabriel

Northern segment
- Length: 1.61 mi (2.59 km)
- South end: Begin state maintenance in St. Gabriel
- North end: LA 75 in St. Gabriel

Location
- Country: United States
- State: Louisiana
- Parishes: Iberville

Highway system
- Louisiana State Highway System; Interstate; US; State; Scenic
← LA 140	→ LA 142
← SR 409	410	→ SR 411

Louisiana Highway 141 (LA 141) is a state highway located in Iberville Parish, Louisiana. It exists in two disconnected sections totaling 4.07 miles (6.55 km) along Point Clair Road within the city of St. Gabriel.

The route travels through a sparsely populated area along the east bank levee of the Mississippi River opposite the town of White Castle. It is located on either side of a sharp bend in the river known as Point Clair, which is bypassed by LA 75. The southern portion of LA 141 serves the Gillis W. Long Center operated by the Louisiana Army National Guard. Historically the facility served as the Carville National Leprosarium and today contains the National Hansen's Disease Museum. LA 141 also served to connect LA 75 with the White Castle Ferry until its permanent closure in June 2013.

== Route description ==
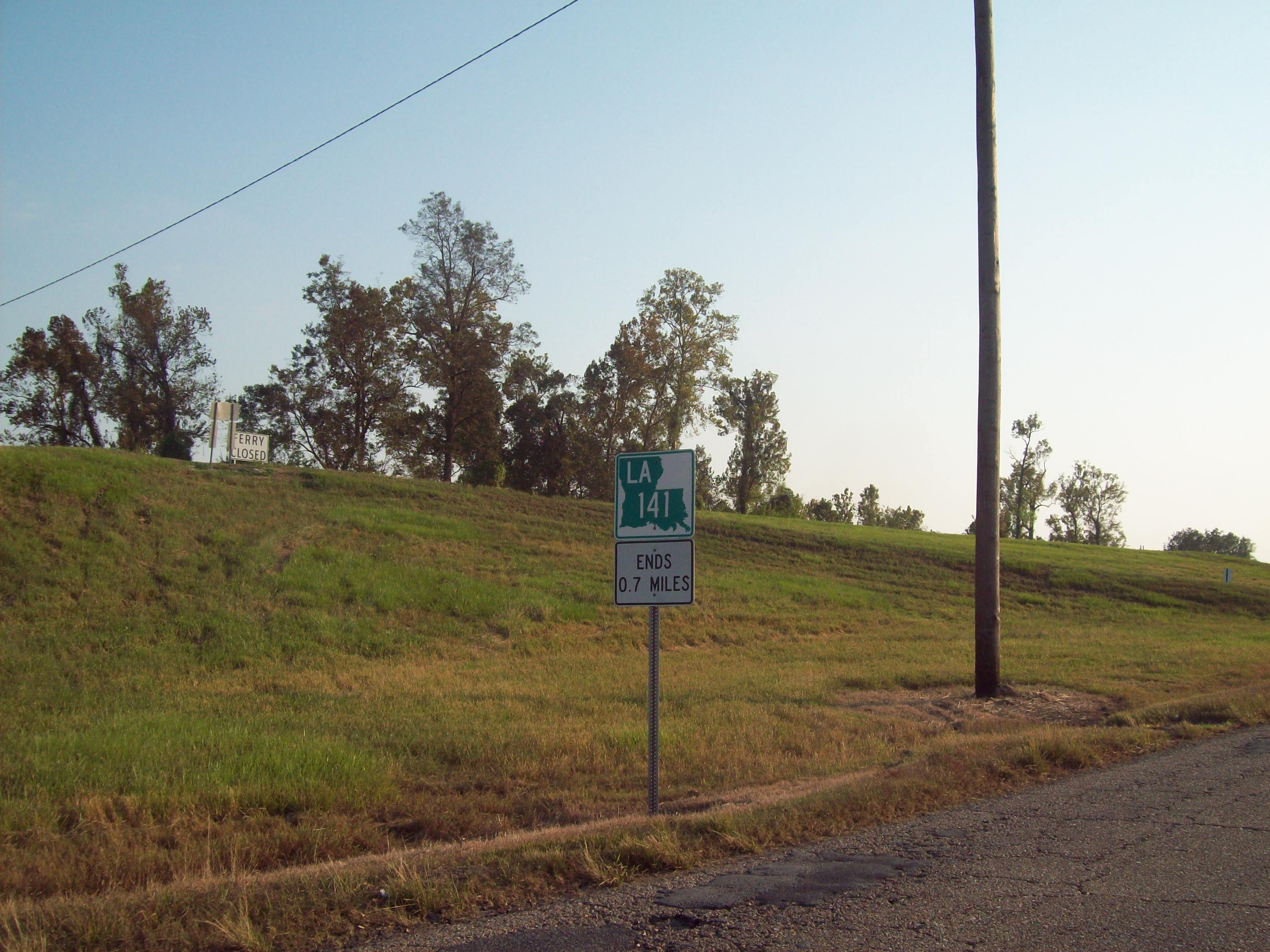
Route marker indicating the upcoming end of LA 141

From the south, LA 141 begins at an intersection with LA 75 in an area within St. Gabriel known as Carville. From this intersection, LA 75 turns north from Point Clair Road onto Martin Luther King Parkway while LA 141 continues straight ahead in a southwest direction along the Mississippi River levee. After passing in front of the Gillis W. Long Center, state maintenance ends, and a private gravel road continues around the bend in the river known as Point Clair.

4.5 miles (7.2 km) later, state maintenance picks up again at the end of the gravel road. LA 141 proceeds northeast along the river to a second intersection with LA 75, which cuts across the Point Clair bend.

=== Route classification and data ===
The route is classified by the Louisiana Department of Transportation and Development (La DOTD) as a rural local road, except for the portion that connected LA 75 with the White Castle Ferry, which is designated as a rural minor collector. Its average daily traffic volume in 2013 has been reported as follows: 1,590 from the overall southern terminus to the entrance of the Gillis W. Long Center; and 1,210 to the overall northern terminus. LA 141 is an undivided two-lane highway for its entire length and has a posted speed limit of 45 mph (70 km/h) between the former ferry landing and the end of state maintenance.

The southern portion of LA 141 is a small part of the ten-state Great River Road, which is designated as a National Scenic Byway.

== History ==
=== Pre-1955 route numbering ===
State Route 410
- Location: Iberville Parish
- Length: 8.7 mi (14.0 km)
- Existed: 1928–1955

In the original Louisiana Highway system in use between 1921 and 1955, the modern LA 141 corridor was designated as State Route 410.

Route 410. Beginning at the Gueymard Cut-Off, going west, following the river, ending again at the Gueymard Cut-Off on the north end, in the Parish of Iberville.

— 1928 legislative route description

Route 410 was created in 1928 by an act of the state legislature. It originally existed as a loop off of Route 63, traversing the sharp bend in the Mississippi River occupied by the former leper colony. Route 63, like the modern LA 75, cut across the bend between Carville and St. Gabriel. The route remained largely the same prior to the 1955 Louisiana Highway renumbering, experiencing only minor alterations due to reconstruction of the river levee.

=== Post-1955 route history ===
LA 141 was created in 1955 as a direct renumbering of State Route 410.

Class "B": La 141—From a point at or near the US Public Health Service Hospital near Carville to a junction with La 30 at or near Carville.
Class "C": La 141—From a point at or near US Public Health Service Hospital near Carville southwest and northeast to a junction with La 30 southwest of St. Gabriel.

— 1955 legislative route description

At this time, the route was still continuous, looping off of what was then LA 30. In the mid-1960s, LA 30 was moved onto a new alignment set back from the river between Baton Rouge and St. Gabriel. LA 75 was extended over the former alignment, replacing LA 30 as both the northern and southern terminus of LA 141.

In recent years, the community of St. Gabriel was incorporated, and the entire route of LA 141 is now within the city limits. The middle section of the route containing a gravel surface was removed from the state highway system by the 1990s and today runs through private property.

== Future ==
La DOTD is currently engaged in a program that aims to transfer about 5,000 miles (8,000 km) of state-owned roadways to local governments over the next several years. Under this plan of "right-sizing" the state highway system, the northern segment of LA 141 is proposed for deletion as it does not meet a significant interurban travel function.

== Major intersections ==
The entire highway is in St. Gabriel, Iberville Parish.

mi	km	Destinations	Notes
0.0	0.0	LA 75 (Point Clair Road, Martin Luther King Parkway) – Industrial Plants	Southern terminus
Gap in LA 141 at milepost 2.5 (4.0 km); route continues as private road for 4.5 miles (7.2 km)
4.1	6.6	LA 75 (Martin Luther King Parkway) – St. Gabriel	Northern terminus
1.000 mi = 1.609 km; 1.000 km = 0.621 mi
