= Louisiana Highway 73 =

State highway in Louisiana, United States

Louisiana Highway 73

Route information
- Maintained by Louisiana DOTD
- Length: 26.3 mi (42.3 km)

Major junctions
- South end: LA 75 near Geismar
- I-10 near Prairieville; US 61 in Prairieville; US 61 in Inniswold; I-110 in Baton Rouge
- North end: LA 30 in Baton Rouge

Location
- Country: United States
- State: Louisiana
- Parishes: Ascension, East Baton Rouge

Highway system
- Louisiana State Highway System; Interstate; US; State; Scenic
← LA 72	→ LA 74

Louisiana Highway 73 (LA 73) is a state highway in Louisiana stretching from Geismar to Baton Rouge. LA 73 was built as a bypass to the backbends of River Road. It was soon after bypassed itself in a more complete way with U.S. Route 61 (Airline Highway).

== Route description ==
From LA 75 (River Road), LA 73 travels north north east as an undivided two-lane road through the Dutchtown area before hitting I-10 and US 61. From US 61 it turns north through Prairieville, Louisiana and turns northwest to cross Bayou Manchac. At one time, this portion of the highway was called Hope Villa Road. For most of its length in East Baton Rouge Parish, LA 73 is known as Jefferson Highway. At Tiger Bend Road it becomes a four-lane with turning lane for about a mile and before becoming concurrent with Airline Highway for another mile. After leaving Airline Highway it takes a generally northwesterly path until it becomes Government Street at the entrance to downtown Baton Rouge. As Government Street it proceeds due west to a junction with River Road. LA 73 ends at an intersection with the southbound beginning of LA 30, also known as St. Philip Street.

== History ==
The route of LA 73 was originally called "Clay Cut Road," as it roughly followed the Claycut Bayou through the southern part of East Baton Rouge Parish. Other names for the road were Hope Villa Road, as it traversed through the community of Hope Villa in Ascension Parish. When the Jefferson Highway auto trail was designated in 1916, Clay Cut and Hope Villa Roads became part of the new road (there is now another Claycut Road in Baton Rouge, located south of the present-day LA-73). When Louisiana numbered their highways in 1921 plan, Jefferson Highway was designated Louisiana Highway 1. US 61 followed the section between Prairieville and the Mississippi River from 1926 until 1933 when the Airline Highway was opened between Prairieville and the Bonnet Carré Spillway. US 61 remained on the section between Prairieville and Baton Rouge until 1941, when Airline Highway was extended into Baton Rouge. As of 2018, the portion west of LA 948 is under agreement to be removed from the state highway system and transferred to local control.

== Major junctions ==
Parish	Location	mi	km	Destinations	Notes
Ascension	Geismar	0.0	0.0	LA 75 (River Road)	
Ascension	Geismar	1.5	2.4	LA 30	
Ascension	Dutchtown	3.4	5.5	LA 429 east (Cornerview Road) – Gonzales	Western terminus of LA 429
Ascension	Dutchtown	4.4	7.1	LA 74	
Ascension	Prairieville	5.3– 5.6	8.5– 9.0	I-10 – New Orleans, Baton Rouge	Exit 173 (I-10)
Ascension	Prairieville	5.6	9.0	LA 621 east	Western terminus of LA 621
Ascension	Prairieville	7.9	12.7	US 61 south (Airline Highway) – New Orleans	Southern end of US 61 concurrency
Ascension	Prairieville	8.0	12.9	US 61 north (Airline Highway)	Northern end of US 61 concurrency
Ascension	Prairieville	9.2	14.8	LA 42	
Ascension	Prairieville	10.2	16.4	LA 427 north	Southern terminus of LA 427
East Baton Rouge	Old Jefferson	12.7	20.4	LA 948 west / Round Oak Drive	Western terminus of LA 948
East Baton Rouge	Baton Rouge	16.6	26.7	US 61 south (Airline Highway)	Southern end of US 61 concurrency
East Baton Rouge	Baton Rouge	16.9	27.2	LA 3246 west (Siegen Lane) / Sherwood Forest Boulevard	Eastern terminus of LA 3246
East Baton Rouge	Inniswold	17.6	28.3	US 61 north (Airline Highway) – Baton Rouge	Interchange; northern end of US 61 concurrency; northbound US 61 to northbound LA 73 and southbound LA 73 to southbound US 61 only
East Baton Rouge	Westminster–Baton Rouge line	19.4	31.2	I-12 east – Hammond	Eastbound I-12 entrance only
East Baton Rouge	Westminster–Baton Rouge line	19.5	31.4	LA 1068 north (Drusilla Drive)	Southern terminus of LA 1068
East Baton Rouge	Baton Rouge	19.9	32.0	LA 3064 south (Essen Lane) to I-12 west	Northern terminus of LA 3064
East Baton Rouge	Baton Rouge	21.1	34.0	LA 426 east (Old Hammond Highway) / Corporate Boulevard	Western terminus of LA 426
East Baton Rouge	Baton Rouge	24.3	39.1	LA 427 south (South Acadian Thruway)	Northern terminus of LA 427
East Baton Rouge	Baton Rouge	25.0	40.2	LA 67 north (South 22nd Street)	Southern terminus of LA 67
East Baton Rouge	Baton Rouge	25.7– 25.8	41.4– 41.5	I-110 north – Metro Airport, Natchez, MS; South 10th Street to I-10 east / I-12 east – New Orleans, Hammond	Exit 1A (I-110); no access from eastbound I-10
East Baton Rouge	Baton Rouge	26.3	42.3	LA 30 (St. Louis Street)	Northern terminus of LA 30 northbound (One-way pair)
East Baton Rouge	Baton Rouge	26.3	42.3	LA 30 south (St. Philips Street)	Northern terminus of LA 30 southbound (One-way pair)
1.000 mi = 1.609 km; 1.000 km = 0.621 mi: Concurrency terminus; Incomplete access
