= Gardere, Louisiana =

Gardere Riverland
- Census-designated place
- Location in East Baton Rouge Parish and the state of Louisiana.
- Coordinates: 30°21′07″N 91°07′44″W
- Country: United States
- State: Louisiana
- Parish: East Baton Rouge

Area
  - Total: 3.32 sq mi (8.60 km^{2})
  - Land: 3.32 sq mi (8.60 km^{2})
  - Water: 0 sq mi (0.00 km^{2})
- Elevation: 23 ft (7.0 m)

Population (2020)
  - Total: 13,203
  - Density: 3,975/sq mi (1,534.8/km^{2})
- Time zone: UTC-6 (CST)
  - Summer (DST): UTC-5 (CDT)
- Area code: 225
- FIPS code: 22-28275

Gardere is an unincorporated area and census-designated place (CDP) in East Baton Rouge Parish, Louisiana, United States. The area is also known as Riverland. As of the 2020 census, Gardere had a population of 13,203. It is part of the Baton Rouge Metropolitan Statistical Area.

== Geography ==
Gardere is located in southern East Baton Rouge Parish at 30°21′7″N 91°7′44″W (30.351836, -91.128945). It is bordered to the west and the northeast by the city of Baton Rouge. Louisiana Highway 30 forms the southwestern edge of the CDP, and Louisiana Highway 42 runs through the northeast side of the CDP. Both highways lead northwest 8 miles (13 km) to the center of Baton Rouge. Highway 30 leads south 6 miles (10 km) to St. Gabriel, while Highway 42 leads east 6 miles (10 km) to Interstate 10.

According to the United States Census Bureau, the Gardere CDP has a total area of 3.4 square miles (8.8 km^{2}), all land.

== Demographics ==
Historical population
Census	Pop.	Note	%±
1990	7,209		—
2000	8,992		24.7%
2010	10,580		17.7%
2020	13,203		24.8%
U.S. Decennial Census; 1950 1960 1970 1980; 1990 2000 2010

Gardere first appeared as a census designated place in the 1990 United States census.

=== 2020 ===
Gardere, Louisiana – Racial and ethnic composition Note: the US Census treats Hispanic/Latino as an ethnic category. This table excludes Latinos from the racial categories and assigns them to a separate category. Hispanics/Latinos may be of any race.
Race / Ethnicity (NH = Non-Hispanic)	Pop 2000	Pop 2010	Pop 2020	% 2000	% 2010	% 2020
White alone (NH)	1,793	2,045	2,772	19.94%	19.33%	21.00%
Black or African American alone (NH)	6,351	6,713	6,385	70.63%	63.45%	48.36%
Native American or Alaska Native alone (NH)	10	15	22	0.11%	0.14%	0.17%
Asian alone (NH)	190	177	474	2.11%	1.67%	3.59%
Native Hawaiian or Pacific Islander alone (NH)	5	2	1	0.06%	0.02%	0.01%
Other race alone (NH)	24	17	63	0.27%	0.16%	0.48%
Mixed race or Multiracial (NH)	106	148	322	1.18%	1.40%	2.44%
Hispanic or Latino (any race)	513	1,463	3,164	5.71%	13.83%	23.96%
Total	8,992	10,580	13,203	100.00%	100.00%	100.00%

As of the 2020 United States census, there were 13,203 people, 4,332 households, and 2,205 families residing in the CDP.

As of the census of 2000, there were 8,992 people, 3,216 households, and 2,010 families residing in the CDP. The population density was 2,689.1 inhabitants per square mile (1,038.3/km^{2}). There were 3,601 housing units at an average density of 1,076.9 per square mile (415.8/km^{2}). The racial makeup of the CDP was 22.83% White, 70.96% African American, 0.14% Native American, 2.15% Asian, 0.07% Pacific Islander, 2.21% from other races, and 1.63% from two or more races. Hispanic or Latino of any race were 5.71% of the population.

There were 3,216 households, out of which 43.5% had children under the age of 18 living with them, 29.7% were married couples living together, 26.9% had a female householder with no husband present, and 37.5% were non-families. 21.6% of all households were made up of individuals, and 0.8% had someone living alone who was 65 years of age or older. The average household size was 2.79 and the average family size was 3.34.

In the CDP, the population was spread out, with 33.7% under the age of 18, 20.0% from 18 to 24, 34.8% from 25 to 44, 10.3% from 45 to 64, and 1.3% who were 65 years of age or older. The median age was 24 years. For every 100 females, there were 97.1 males. For every 100 females age 18 and over, there were 89.9 males.

The median income for a household in the CDP was $26,223, and the median income for a family was $27,550. Males had a median income of $27,219 versus $20,735 for females. The per capita income for the CDP was $11,448. About 22.7% of families and 27.8% of the population were below the poverty line, including 34.3% of those under age 18 and 15.1% of those age 65 or over.

== Education ==
East Baton Rouge Parish Public Schools serves Gardere.

Three elementary schools serve sections of Gardere: Highland, Magnolia Woods, and Wildwood. All residents of Gardere are zoned to Kenilworth Middle School. As of 2016 Kenilworth is under the administration of the Recovery School District (RSD). Half of the residents of Gardere may also attend Glasgow Middle School while, in the other half, the option middle school is Westdale Middle School; both schools are directly controlled by EBR Parish Schools. Residents in the western section are zoned to McKinley High School, while those in the eastern section are zoned to Tara High School.

When Robert E. Lee High School was in operation, it served all of Gardere.
