= Anthony Nelson (musician) =

American singer (born 1975)

- Born: Anthony Jerrod Nelson; October 6, 1975 (age 50); Baton Rouge, Louisiana, United States
- Origin: Saint Gabriel, Louisiana
- Genres: Gospel, Contemporary Christian, Praise and worship
- Occupations: Singer, Songwriter, Composer, Producer, multi-instrument musician, engineer
- Instruments: Vocals, bass guitar, keyboard
- Years active: 2015-Present
- Website: https://www.singovercomers.com/

Anthony Jerrod Nelson (born October 6, 1975) is an American gospel singer, songwriter, composer, record producer and lead for his band, Anthony Nelson & The Overcomers. He is best known for his Billboard No. 1 gospel hit, "Deeper".

== History ==
Anthony Nelson was born an only child to the late Joe and Joyce Nelson on October 6, 1975. His exposure to gospel music came at a young age through his mother and grandmother who were both gospel vocalists. Nelson earned a Bachelor of Science from Southern University and A&M College and then a Masters of Science from Louisiana State University and find work as an environmental engineer.

After his parents passing he found himself drifting from the church he attended regularly. During his grief, he focused on his relationship with God and started using music to foster this relationship eventually finding himself back in church with a newfound relationship to God. Nelson went on to become a Minister of Music and utilize music to heal and lead worship.

Nelson wanted to share his music and the Lord's message with the world and formed the band "The Overcomers". Nelson and the Overcomers gained fame through listings on Billboard Top Ten Hits and a number one hit on Amazon's top 100 Christian Bestsellers.

== Forming The Overcomers ==
Nelson knew his love for music was the best way to share the Lord's message and in order to avoid the chaos that typically comes with the formation of a band, he recruited family members. Together they created music that combined various styles of folk, R&B, soul, and pop, but kept with the true importance of having lyrics that are biblically and doctrinally sound.

== First album ==
The band released a radio single “Dedicate” prior to the release of the debut album. The album, entitled Love Jesus, Love People featured twelve tracks with a contemporary adult R&B sound.

== Discography ==
- 2016 Love Jesus, Love People
- 2018 Worship: In Spirit and in Truth EP
- 2018 Inhabit EP

== Billboard success ==
The band recorded two singles after Love Jesus, Love People was released. "Deeper" and "Undeserved" were both Billboard Top Ten hits, with "Deeper" coming in at the number one spot for the Gospel category. Both songs are part of the Worship: In Spirit and in Truth EP.
