= Jefferson Highway =

National auto trail in the United States and Canada

Jefferson Highway

Major junctions
- North end: Winnipeg, Manitoba
- South end: New Orleans, Louisiana

Location
- Country: United States

Highway system
- Auto trails

The Jefferson Highway was an automobile highway stretching through the central United States from New Orleans, Louisiana, to Winnipeg, Manitoba, in Canada. The Jefferson Highway was replaced with the new numbered US Highway system in the late 1920s. Portions of the highway are still named Jefferson Highway, including the portions that run through Jefferson Parish, Louisiana; East Baton Rouge Parish, Louisiana; Lee's Summit, Missouri; Osseo, Minnesota; and Wadena, Minnesota.

It was built in the 1910s as part of the National Auto Trail system.

Named for President Thomas Jefferson, inspired by the east–west Lincoln Highway, it was nicknamed the "Palm to Pine Highway", for the varying types of trees found at either end.

== History ==
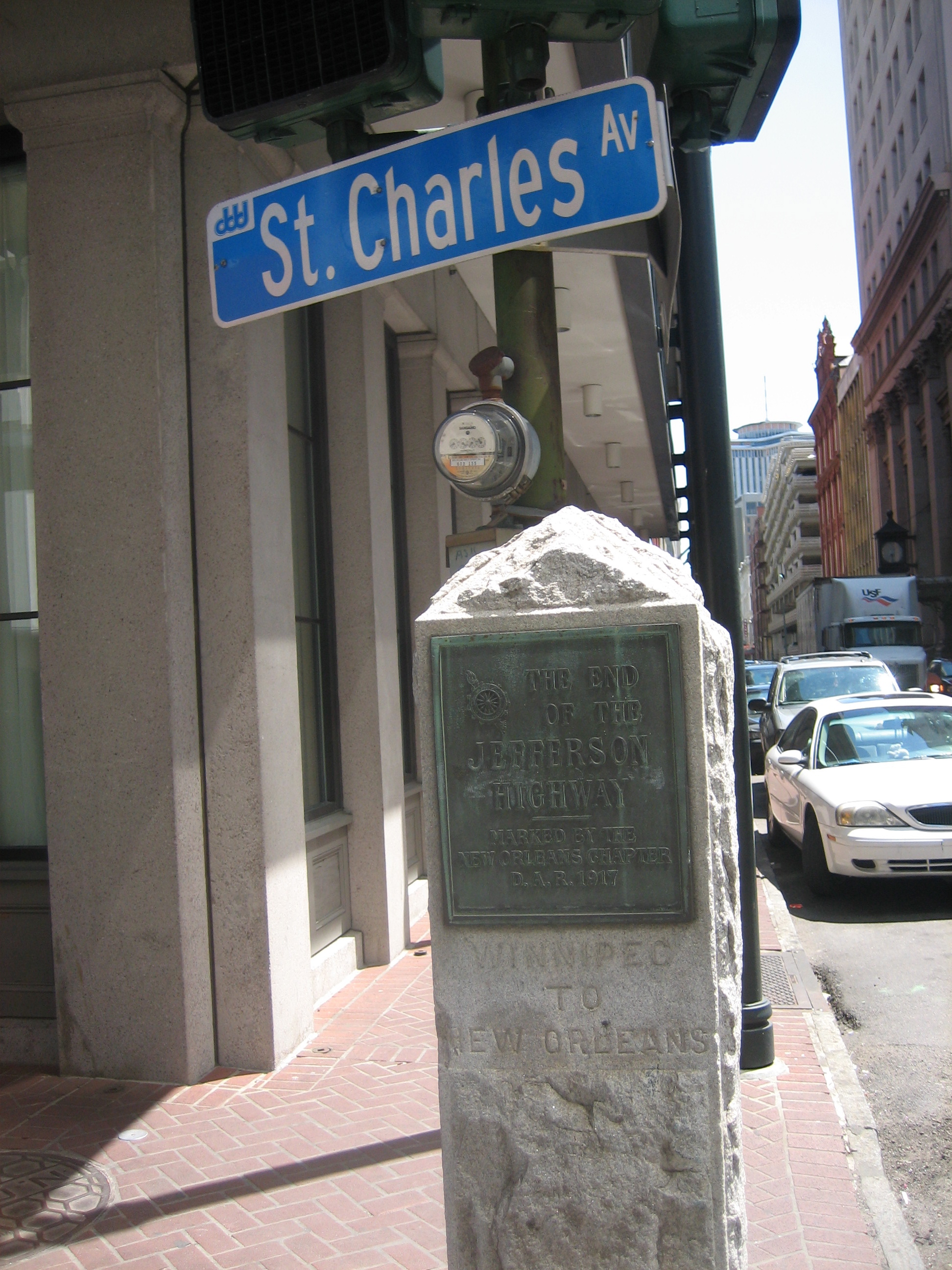
1917 obelisk marking southern terminus of Jefferson Highway, on the corner of St. Charles & Common streets in the New Orleans Central Business District

The southern terminus of the Jefferson Highway was in New Orleans, Louisiana at the intersection of St. Charles Avenue and Common Street. It is marked by a six-foot tall Georgia granite obelisk donated by the New Orleans chapter of the Daughters of the American Revolution. The obelisk was installed on April 15, 1918, and it was formally dedicated the following January.

The original route (finalized in December 1916) on today's roads is as follows:

- Louisiana
  - New Orleans to Kenner:
    - From the southern terminus at Common Street, the Jefferson Highway followed St. Charles Avenue, Canal Street, City Park Avenue, and Metairie Road into Jefferson Parish.
    - Leaving New Orleans, the Jefferson Highway followed Metairie Road, Shrewsbury Road, and Jefferson Highway to Kenner. This route is covered by LA 611-9, LA 3261, LA 611-3, US 90, and LA 48. (The section of road that is called "Jefferson Highway" between Shrewsbury Road and the New Orleans city limits at South Claiborne Avenue was not part of the original route, as it did not exist until 1928.)
  - Kenner to Geismar:
    - From Kenner to Geismar, the Jefferson Highway followed alongside the east bank levee of the Mississippi River which, due to various sections of levee being relocated during the 1920s and 1930s, is often a significant distance removed from the modern River Road. Also, a two-mile section between Norco and Montz was eliminated in 1935 when the parallel U.S. 61 Bonnet Carré Spillway Bridge carrying Airline Highway across the Bonnet Carré Spillway was opened. However, the route is approximated by LA 48 to Norco, River Road to Montz, LA 628 to LaPlace, LA 44 to Burnside, LA 942 to Darrow, and LA 75 to Geismar. (Portions of the River Road at Reserve and Gramercy are still known as Jefferson Highway.)
  - Geismar to Baton Rouge:
    - From Geismar to Baton Rouge, the route followed LA 73 and is still known as (Old) Jefferson Highway.
    - The original routing through downtown Baton Rouge followed Claycut Road, LA 427 (South Acadian Thruway), LA 73 (Government Street), 19th Street, and North Street to the former Mississippi River ferry landing to Port Allen.
  - Port Allen to Alexandria:
    - LA 987 (Court Street), North Jefferson Avenue, and LA 986 (Rosedale Road) through Port Allen.
    - LA 76 to Rosedale.
    - LA 77 to Ravenswood.
    - LA 10 to Red Cross.
    - The Jefferson Highway crossed the Atchafalaya River by ferry to Melville and continued on LA 10 to Lebeau.
    - US 71 to Bunkie.
    - LA 1177 and US 71 to Cheneyville. (There is a short section of old Jefferson Highway off US 71 in Cheneyville.)
    - US 71 and LA 456 to Lamourie. (Part of LA 456 at Lecompte is known as Jefferson Highway.)
    - LA 470, US 71-167 (briefly), and Old Baton Rouge Highway to Alexandria.
  - Alexandria to Pineville:
    - US 71 (Jefferson Hwy. or MacArthur Dr.), Lee Street, Main Street, and Murray Street through Alexandria.
    - The Jefferson Highway crossed the Red River on a now-demolished bridge at the foot of Murray Street into Pineville.
    - US 165-BUS (Main Street and Military Highway), LA 180 (Jefferson Highway), and US 71 (Shreveport Highway) through Pineville.
  - Pineville to Nachitoches:
    - US 71 and LA 3225 (Shreveport Highway). (Stainaker Street is a small, severed portion of the original route near the junction of US 71 and LA 3225.)
    - US 71, LA 492, and LA 8 to Colfax. (Numerous curves were straightened along this route sometime after 1956 and exist as small pieces of road such as: Old US 71, Walker Gravel Pit Road, and Parker Street west of LA 3225; Old US 71 and Rocky Lane at Rock Hill; and Old Jefferson Highway just south of Colfax.)
    - LA 158 and US 71 to just south of Montgomery, following Old Jefferson Highway into town and leaving via North Jefferson Highway.
    - US 71 and LA 1225 to Clarence.
    - LA 6 to Natchitoches.
  - Natchitoches to Shreveport:
    - LA 6 (via LA 3278) to Robeline. (Several curves have been straightened between I-49 and Robeline, two of which exist as Old LA 6 and Johnny Floyd Road.)
    - LA 120 to Belmont.
    - LA 175 (via Old Jefferson Road north of Pelican) to Mansfield, following Old Jefferson Highway into town.
    - US 171 to Shreveport, via Old Jefferson Road through Stonewall and Old Mansfield Road through Keithville.
  - Shreveport to Texas state line:
    - US 171, Mansfield Road, and US 79-US 80 (Greenwood Road) to I-20 at Flournoy.
    - Westbrook Road, LA 511 (West 70th Street), US 79-80 (Greenwood Road) to Greenwood.
    - US 80 (Texas Avenue) across the state line toward Waskom, Texas.

When Louisiana numbered its state highways in 1921, the entire length of the Jefferson Highway through Louisiana was designated as State Route 1. This route was in effect until the 1955 Louisiana Highway renumbering. When the U.S. Highway System was designated in 1926, the Jefferson Highway was split into four U.S. Highways in Louisiana: US 61 from New Orleans to Baton Rouge (before it was rerouted onto the Airline Highway), US 71 from Baton Rouge to Clarence, US 171 from Mansfield to Shreveport, and US 80 from Shreveport west into Texas. The section between Natchitoches and Mansfield was not included in the U.S. Highway System.

== Cities along the route ==
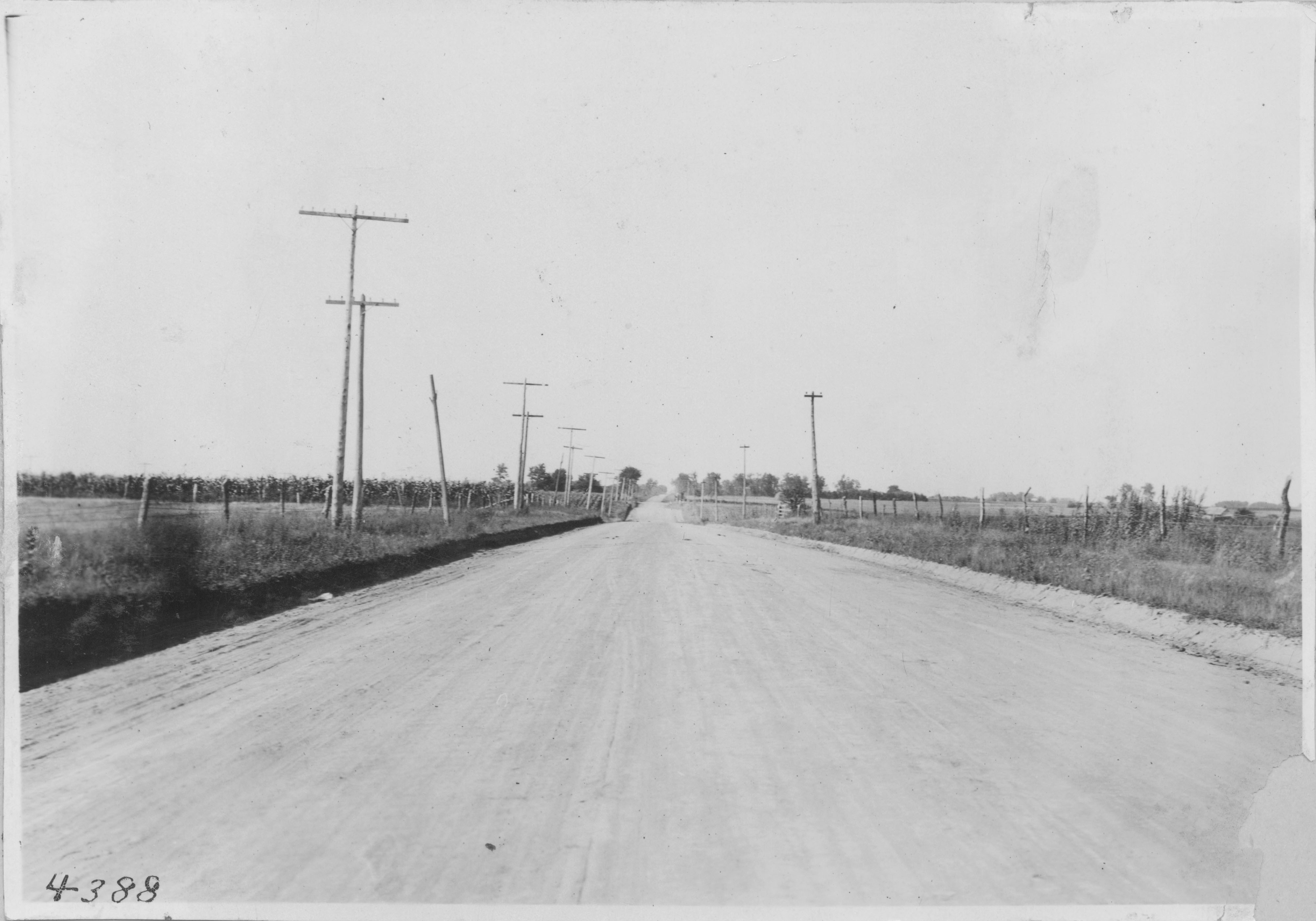
The JH near Leon, Iowa, in 1917

- New Orleans, Louisiana
- Alexandria, Louisiana
- Bunkie, Louisiana
- Shreveport, Louisiana
- Bonham, Texas
- Marshall, Texas
- Mount Pleasant, Texas
- Caddo, Oklahoma
- McAlester, Oklahoma
- Eufaula, Oklahoma
- Checotah, Oklahoma
- Muskogee, Oklahoma
- Pryor Creek, Oklahoma
- Vinita, Oklahoma
- Miami, Oklahoma
- Joplin, Missouri
- Nevada, Missouri
- Baxter Springs, Kansas
- Pittsburg, Kansas
- Frontenac, Kansas
- Fort Scott, Kansas
- Paola, Kansas
- Overland Park, Kansas
- Harrisonville, Missouri
- Lee's Summit, Missouri
- Kansas City, Missouri
- Cameron, Missouri
- Saint Joseph, Missouri
- Lamoni, Iowa
- Leon, Iowa
- Osceola, Iowa
- Indianola, Iowa
- Des Moines, Iowa
- Colo, Iowa
- Mason City, Iowa
- Albert Lea, Minnesota
- Owatonna, Minnesota
- Faribault, Minnesota
- Minneapolis, Minnesota
- St. Cloud, Minnesota
- Bemidji, Minnesota
- Thief River Falls, Minnesota
- Winnipeg, Manitoba

== See also ==
- United States Highway system
- Jefferson Lines, an intercity bus company, operated service from Texas to Winnipeg, and takes its name from the old Jefferson Highway. As of October 7, 2010, the Winnipeg–Grand Forks section was terminated.
- Manitoba Highway 75
