= Bayou Pigeon, Louisiana =

Unincorporated community in Louisiana

Bayou Pigeon Pigeon
- Unincorporated community
- Location of Bayou Pigeon in Louisiana
- Coordinates: 30°04′37″N 91°17′58″W
- Country: United States
- State: Louisiana
- Parish: Iberville
- Elevation: 7 ft (2.1 m)
- Time zone: UTC-6 (CST)
  - Summer (DST): UTC-5 (CDT)
- Area code: 225
- GNIS feature ID: 543577
- FIPS code: 22-60145

Bayou Pigeon or Pigeon is a small unincorporated community Cajun village located near the southern extremities of Iberville Parish, Louisiana, United States. The hamlet is primarily composed of fishermen and plant workers. A great majority of the village's population are of Cajun descent.

== History ==
Many of the residents trace their lineage back to Pierre Part, a town in nearby Assumption Parish. Cajun French can still be heard in most of the older residents' homes. Some have been noted to having used Cajun French as their sole language even as late as the early 2000s.

== Geography ==
It is bordered by the Atchafalaya Basin on the west, Louisiana Highway 404 to the north, White Castle Canal on the east, and Iberia Parish to the south.

The main thoroughfare is Louisiana Highway 75. There is one bridge across the Grand River near the Catholic Church. It was erected in 1957. Hwy. 75 terminates on the east bank of the Grand River in Bayou Pigeon at a location dubbed "The End of the World."

== Demographics ==
Catholicism is the predominant faith, and the only church was St. Joan of Arc Catholic Church, closed November 24, 2017. Despite the predominance of Roman Catholicism, there was a Southern Baptist congregation in the village from the 1960s to the late 1980s, known as Bayou Pigeon Baptist Church and led by Rev. George W. Ray (1912–1992).

== Media ==
The village was also featured on the Discovery Channel show "Dirty Jobs" in an episode profiling the work of a local crawfisher, and also on the History Channel show "Swamp People". It is also featured in Country Music Television's Swamp Pawn show.
