= Alhambra, Louisiana =

Unincorporated community in Louisiana

Alhambra
- Unincorporated community
- Location of Alhambra in Louisiana
- Coordinates: 30°10′36″N 91°07′23″W
- Country: United States
- State: Louisiana
- Parish: Iberville
- Elevation: 20 ft (6.1 m)
- Time zone: UTC-6 (CST)
  - Summer (DST): UTC-5 (CDT)
- Area code: 225
- GNIS feature ID: 553283
- FIPS code: 22-01130

Alhambra is an unincorporated community in Iberville Parish, Louisiana, United States.

== Etymology ==
Alhambra took its name from a stately red-colored house overlooking the Mississippi River called Alhambra, a name ultimately derived from Arabic meaning "red castle".

== Alhambra sugar plantation ==
The red house was built by a man named Christopher Adams in 1855 and included a beautiful garden that surrounded the property. After the death of Adams the home fell into disrepair and was demolished in 1917. While the plantation house was being torn down the workers discovered that the roof was made out of thick solid-copper sheets hinting that the Adams family was extremely wealthy.
