= Malaika Favorite =

- Born: 1949 (age 76–77); Geismar, Louisiana, U.S.
- Education: Louisiana State University
- Known for: Visual artist and writer
- Style: Oil, acrylic, and water color

Malaika Favorite (born 1949) is an American visual artist and writer whose art work can be found in major collections in the U.S. She works mainly in oil, acrylic, and watercolor and has carried out experiments with folded canvas and the written word as another dimension of a painting's text. Her provocative paintings and sculpture pieces emanate as much from her personal history as it does from the wider world.

== Early life ==
She is the second of nine children, to Amos Favorite, Sr. and Rosemary Favorite. In the 1960s she integrated the Ascension Parish high school in Geismar, Louisiana, when she became the first African-American to attend the all-white school.

== Career ==
Favorite received her B.A and MFA degrees in fine art from Louisiana State University where her first works appeared. Her art work is featured in Art: African American by Samella Lewis, Black Art in Louisiana by Bernardine B. Proctor and the St. James Guide to Black Artists, edited by Thomas Riggs and can be found in the following collections: Absolut Vodka collection, Morris Museum of Art, Augusta GA, Louisiana State University Print Collection, Baton Rouge, LA, Alexandria Museum of Art, Alexandria LA, The Coca-Cola Company, Atlanta GA, Hartsfield International Airport, Atlanta GA, The National Underground Railroad Freedom Center, Cincinnati Ohio, Rosel Fann Recreation Center, Atlanta GA. Favorite has outdoor murals on Auburn Ave. in Atlanta and on White St. in Atlanta. She also painted murals that adorn the entrance of the Tiana's Bayou Adventure attraction at Disneyland in California and Magic Kingdom in Florida.

Favorite works in a variety of forms and media. Her experiments with literature as part of the painting's text and those with folded canvas are prime examples, and she's equally at home working in oils, acrylics, water-colors, and lithographs. She notes in one of her artists statements that:

it is very difficult to explain a work or art, mostly because the work is its own explanation. Art is not for the immediate audience only, if it was it would be a prop or backdrop for a play, designed to be viewed for a limited time. Visual art should be timeless. It should speak to each generation, and to each viewer as an endless dialogue that continues to inspire, fascinate and delight.

She has published three collections of poetry: Illuminated Manuscript, New Orleans Poetry Journal Press (1991), Dreaming at the Manor (2014), and Ascension (2016) winner of the Naomi Long Madgett Poetry Award. Her poetry, fiction, and articles appear in numerous anthologies and journals, including: you say. say and Hell strung and crooked (Uphook Press) 2009 & 2010, Pen International, Hurricane Blues, Drumvoices Review, Uncommon Place, Xavier Review, The Maple Leaf Rag, Visions International, Louisiana Literature, Louisiana English Journal, Big Muddy, and Art Papers. She is the winner of the 2005 Louisiana Literature Prize for Poetry.

== Awards and grants ==
- Puffin Foundation Grant, 2008
- Porter Fleming Foundation Grant, 2007
- Georgia Council For The Arts, 1992
- Special Grant for Excellence in the Arts, Delta Sigma Theta sorority, 1987
- Fulbright-Hays study tour, Art of India, 1978.
- African American Institute, 1975.

== One person shows ==
- Columbia Theological Seminary, Decatur GA. March - April 2000
- Camille Love Gallery, Atlanta GA January 1996
- Stephens College, Davis Art Gallery, Columbia Missouri, November 1993
- Augusta College, Augusta GA, February 1993
- Paine College, Augusta GA, January 1993
- Galerie Melancon, Lake Charles LA, February 1990
- Posselt Baker Gallery, New Orleans LA, November 1989, 1986, 1985, 1984
- South Shore Bank, Chicago Illinois, February 1989
- Zigler Museum, Jennings LA, August 1988
- Baton Rouge Gallery LA, June 1988.

== Major collectors ==
- St. Margaret's Catholic Church (Lake Charles, Louisiana)
- Morris Museum of Art (Augusta, Georgia)
- Louisiana State University Print Collection (Baton Rouge, Louisiana)
- Alexandria Museum of Art (Alexandria, Louisiana)
- The National Ecumenical Museum of Art (St. Louis, Missouri)
- Lucey Laney Walker Museum (Augusta, Georgia)
- River Road African American Museum (Burnside, Louisiana)
- The Coca-Cola Company (Atlanta, Georgia)
- King & Spalding law firm (Atlanta, Georgia)
- Absolut Vodka (New York, New York)
- Hartsfield–Jackson Atlanta International Airport (Atlanta, Georgia)
- Harriett G. Damell Senior Multipurpose Facility (Atlanta, Georgia)
- National Underground Railroad Freedom Center (Cincinnati, Ohio)
- West End Mall (Atlanta, Georgia)
- 150 Franklin Street Gallery (Harrisonburg, Virginia)
