= Iberville Parish, Louisiana =

Parish in Louisiana, United States

Iberville Parish
- Parish
- Parish of Iberville; Paroisse d'Iberville (French)
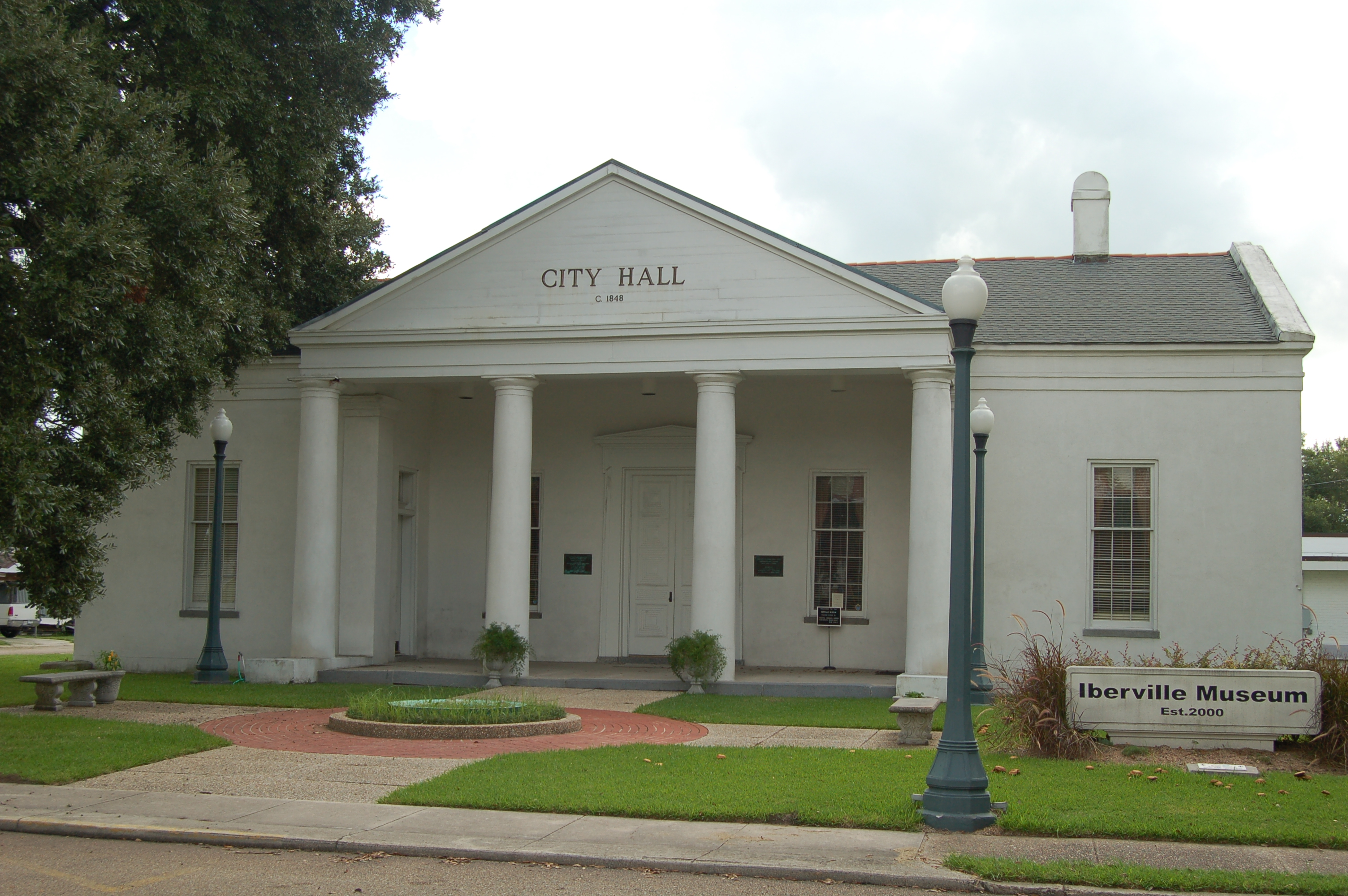
- Iberville Parish Courthouse building, originally the Courthouse, then the Plaquemine City Hall, now used as the Iberville Museum

- Flag Seal Logo

- Location within the U.S. state of Louisiana
- Coordinates: 30°16′N 91°21′W
- Country: United States
- State: Louisiana
- Founded: 1807
- Named for: Pierre Le Moyne d'Iberville
- Seat: Plaquemine
- Largest city: St. Gabriel

Area
  - Total: 653 sq mi (1,690 km^{2})
  - Land: 619 sq mi (1,600 km^{2})
  - Water: 34 sq mi (88 km^{2}) 5.2%

Population (2020)
  - Total: 30,241
  - Estimate (2025): 29,579 ▼
  - Density: 48.9/sq mi (18.9/km^{2})
- Time zone: UTC−6 (Central)
  - Summer (DST): UTC−5 (CDT)
- Congressional districts: 2nd, 6th
- Website: www.ibervilleparish.com

Iberville Parish (French: Paroisse d'Iberville) is a parish located south of Baton Rouge in the U.S. state of Louisiana, formed in 1807. The parish seat is Plaquemine. The population was 30,241 at the 2020 census.

== History ==
The parish is named for Pierre Le Moyne d'Iberville, who founded the French colony of Louisiana.

A few archaeological efforts have been made in the parish, mainly to excavate the Native American burial mounds that have been identified there. The first expedition, led by Clarence B. Moore, was an attempt at collecting data from a couple of the sites, and it set the groundwork for later projects. Moore was mainly interested in the skeletal remains of the previous inhabitants, rather than excavating for archaeological items. Archaeologists are especially interested in these sites because of their uniformity and size. Some of the mounds are seven hundred feet long, a hundred feet wide and six feet tall. Most of them contain human remains.

There were at least 2 wooden forts in the area by 1779, also represent St. Gabriel Parish.

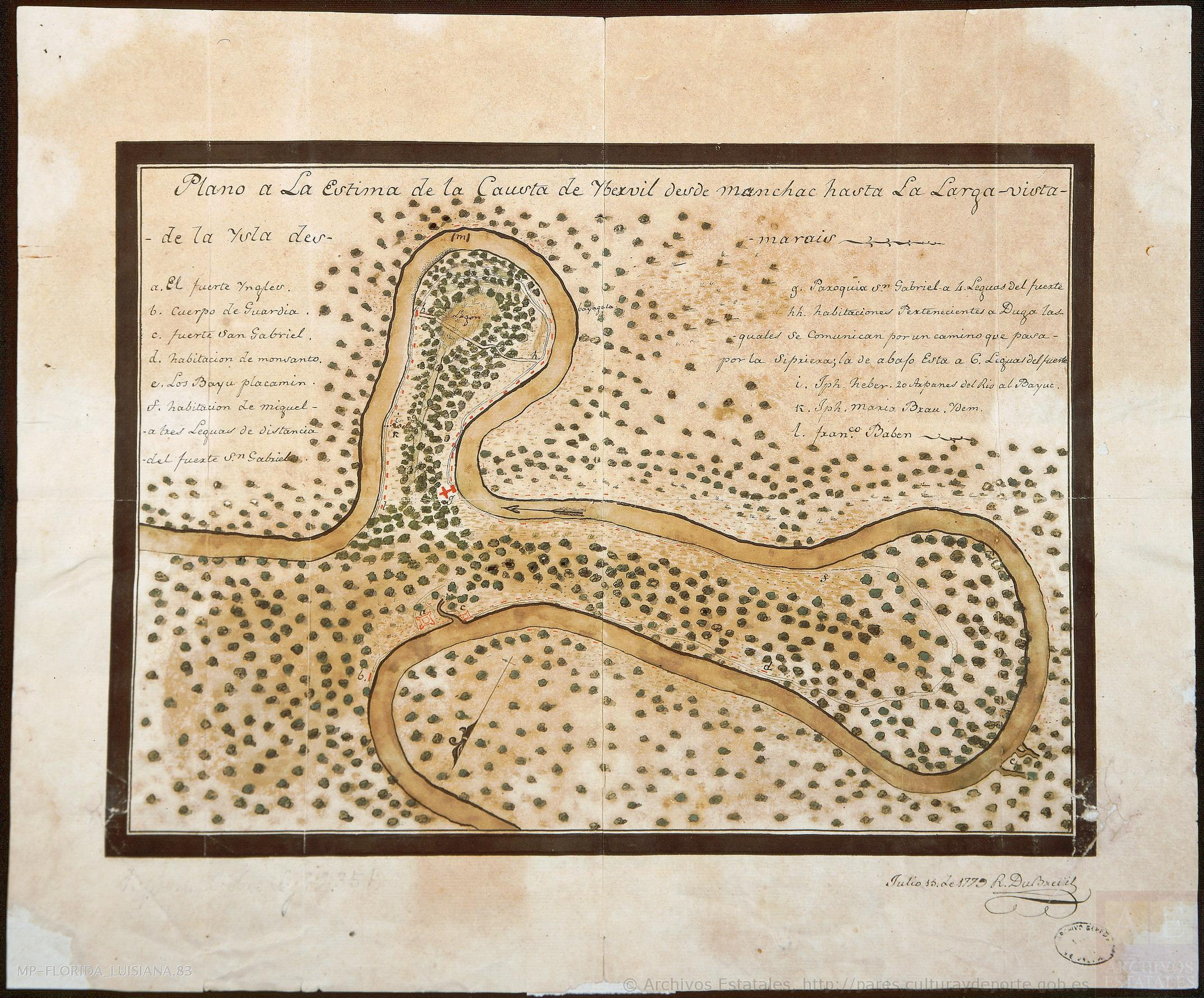
Estimated chart of the Iberville channel, from Manchac to Larga-vista, off the Île des Marais. By Raimundo Dubreuil

Iberville Parish is represented in the Louisiana State Senate by Caleb Kleinpeter, who has served in the Senate since 2022. The parish is currently represented in the state House by Republican Jeremy LaCombe.

== Geography ==
According to the U.S. Census Bureau, the parish has a total area of 653 square miles (1,690 km^{2}), of which 619 square miles (1,600 km^{2}) is land and 34 square miles (88 km^{2}) (5.2%) is water. Iberville Parish is part of the Baton Rouge metropolitan statistical area.

=== Major highways ===
- Interstate 10
- Louisiana Highway 1
- Louisiana Highway 30
- Louisiana Highway 69
- Louisiana Highway 74
- Louisiana Highway 75
- Louisiana Highway 76
- Louisiana Highway 77
- Louisiana Highway 141-1
- Louisiana Highway 141-2
- Louisiana Highway 327
- Louisiana Highway 386
- Louisiana Highway 404
- Louisiana Highway 405
- Louisiana Highway 411
- Louisiana Highway 975
- Louisiana Highway 988
- Louisiana Highway 991
- Louisiana Highway 992-3
- Louisiana Highway 993
- Louisiana Highway 994
- Louisiana Highway 995
- Louisiana Highway 996
- Louisiana Highway 997
- Louisiana Highway 1148
- Louisiana Highway 1251
- Louisiana Highway 3000
- Louisiana Highway 3001
- Louisiana Highway 3066
- Louisiana Highway 3075
- Louisiana Highway 3115

=== Adjacent parishes ===
- Pointe Coupee Parish (northwest)
- West Baton Rouge Parish (north)
- East Baton Rouge Parish (northeast)
- Ascension Parish (east)
- Assumption Parish (southeast)
- Iberia Parish (south)
- St. Martin Parish (west)

=== National protected area ===
- Atchafalaya National Wildlife Refuge (part)

== Communities ==
=== Cities ===
- Plaquemine (parish seat)
- St. Gabriel (largest municipality)

=== Towns ===
- Maringouin
- White Castle

=== Villages ===
- Grosse Tete
- Rosedale

=== Unincorporated areas ===
==== Census-designated places ====
- Bayou Goula
- Crescent
- Dorseyville (or Dorcyville)

==== Other unincorporated communities ====
- Alhambra
- Bayou Pigeon
- Bayou Sorrel
- Carville
- Iberville
- Indian Village
- Lone Star
- Ramah
- Seymourville

== Demographics ==
Historical population
Census	Pop.	Note	%±
1820	4,414		—
1830	7,049		59.7%
1840	8,495		20.5%
1850	12,278		44.5%
1860	14,661		19.4%
1870	12,347		−15.8%
1880	17,544		42.1%
1890	21,848		24.5%
1900	27,006		23.6%
1910	30,954		14.6%
1920	26,806		−13.4%
1930	24,638		−8.1%
1940	27,721		12.5%
1950	26,750		−3.5%
1960	29,939		11.9%
1970	30,746		2.7%
1980	32,159		4.6%
1990	31,049		−3.5%
2000	33,320		7.3%
2010	33,387		0.2%
2020	30,241		−9.4%
2025 (est.)	29,579	▼	−2.2%
U.S. Decennial Census; 1790-1960 1900-1990; 1990-2000 2010

Iberville Parish, Louisiana – Racial and ethnic composition Note: the US Census treats Hispanic/Latino as an ethnic category. This table excludes Latinos from the racial categories and assigns them to a separate category. Hispanics/Latinos may be of any race.
Race / Ethnicity (NH = Non-Hispanic)	Pop 1980	Pop 1990	Pop 2000	Pop 2010	Pop 2020	% 1980	% 1990	% 2000	% 2010	% 2020
White alone (NH)	16,018	16,034	16,202	15,987	14,632	49.81%	51.64%	48.63%	47.88%	48.38%
Black or African American alone (NH)	15,253	14,307	16,486	16,338	13,313	47.43%	46.08%	49.48%	48.94%	44.02%
Native American or Alaska Native alone (NH)	24	49	58	61	58	0.07%	0.16%	0.17%	0.18%	0.19%
Asian alone (NH)	55	46	84	101	123	0.17%	0.15%	0.25%	0.30%	0.41%
Native Hawaiian or Pacific Islander alone (NH)	x	x	4	2	13	x	x	0.01%	0.01%	0.04%
Other race alone (NH)	20	15	11	8	75	0.06%	0.05%	0.03%	0.02%	0.25%
Mixed race or Multiracial (NH)	x	x	132	226	609	x	x	0.40%	0.68%	2.01%
Hispanic or Latino (any race)	789	598	343	664	1,418	2.45%	1.93%	1.03%	1.99%	4.69%
Total	32,159	31,049	33,320	33,387	30,241	100.00%	100.00%	100.00%	100.00%	100.00%

As of the 2020 United States census, there were 30,241 people, 10,903 households, and 7,372 families residing in the parish. The 2019 census-estimates determined 32,822 people lived in the parish, down from 33,387 at the 2010 United States census, and up from 33,320 at the 2000 U.S. census.

In 2020, the racial and ethnic makeup of the parish was 48.2% Black and African American, 49.6% non-Hispanic white, 0.1% American Indian and Alaska Native, 0.5% some other race, and 1.5% two or more races. Approximately 2.6% of the population were Hispanic and Latin American of any race. In 2010, its racial and ethnic makeup was 49.3% Black and African American, 48.8% non-Hispanic white, 0.3% Asian, 0.2% American Indian and Alaska Native, 0.6% some other race, and 0.8% from two or more races; 2.0% were Hispanic and Latin American of any race. At the 2000 census. 49.26% were non-Hispanic white, 49.7% African American, 0.18% American Indian and Alaska Native, 0.26% Asian, 0.01% Native Hawaiian and other Pacific Islander, 0.14% from other races, and 0.45% from two or more races; 1.03% were Hispanic and Latin American of any race.

There were 10,903 households at the 2019 census-estimates, and 13,396 housing units. Of the 2,697 businesses operating in the parish, 1,339 were minority-owned. The parish had an employment rate of 47.9%. There was a home-ownership rate of 73.4%, and the median housing value was $143,700; the median gross rent was $755. The median income for a household was $50,161; males had a median income of $54,655 versus $30,773 for females; 27.6% of the population lived at or below the poverty line.

Among its religious population in 2020, the Association of Religion Data Archives determined there were 1,700 non-denominational Protestants, and 7,901 Roman Catholics. Non-denominational Christianity was the largest non-Catholic demographic, reflecting the rise of non/inter-denominationalism.

== Government and infrastructure ==
The Louisiana Department of Public Safety and Corrections operates two prisons, Elayn Hunt Correctional Center and Louisiana Correctional Institute for Women (LCIW), in St. Gabriel in Iberville Parish. LCIW houses the female death row.

United States presidential election results for Iberville Parish, Louisiana
Year	Republican		Democratic		Third party(ies)	
Year	No.	%	No.	%	No.	%
1912	100	13.57%	487	66.08%	150	20.35%
1916	160	24.46%	471	72.02%	23	3.52%
1920	465	54.71%	385	45.29%	0	0.00%
1924	391	40.99%	556	58.28%	7	0.73%
1928	278	14.57%	1,630	85.43%	0	0.00%
1932	430	24.74%	1,308	75.26%	0	0.00%
1936	263	11.87%	1,953	88.13%	0	0.00%
1940	496	16.53%	2,505	83.47%	0	0.00%
1944	432	16.02%	2,265	83.98%	0	0.00%
1948	506	16.50%	1,697	55.33%	864	28.17%
1952	1,710	32.84%	3,497	67.16%	0	0.00%
1956	1,843	46.97%	2,018	51.43%	63	1.61%
1960	1,000	15.85%	4,558	72.25%	751	11.90%
1964	3,432	43.57%	4,445	56.43%	0	0.00%
1968	1,413	14.44%	4,084	41.73%	4,290	43.83%
1972	3,972	46.92%	3,650	43.11%	844	9.97%
1976	3,822	33.56%	7,254	63.69%	313	2.75%
1980	4,463	31.57%	9,361	66.23%	311	2.20%
1984	6,455	42.58%	8,587	56.65%	117	0.77%
1988	5,855	39.46%	8,678	58.49%	303	2.04%
1992	5,211	33.42%	8,218	52.70%	2,165	13.88%
1996	4,031	27.09%	9,553	64.20%	1,295	8.70%
2000	5,573	38.43%	8,355	57.61%	575	3.96%
2004	6,333	42.71%	8,259	55.70%	235	1.58%
2008	7,185	43.75%	9,023	54.95%	213	1.30%
2012	7,271	42.74%	9,548	56.12%	195	1.15%
2016	7,320	45.63%	8,324	51.89%	399	2.49%
2020	7,893	47.21%	8,514	50.92%	312	1.87%
2024	7,616	49.60%	7,503	48.87%	235	1.53%

== Education ==
=== Primary and secondary schools ===
Iberville Parish School Board operates the public schools within all of Iberville Parish.

=== Public libraries ===
Iberville Parish Library operates libraries in the parish. The Parish Headquarters Library is located in Plaquemine. Branches include Bayou Pigeon (Unincorporated area), Bayou Sorrel (Unincorporated area), East Iberville (St. Gabriel), Grosse Tete (Grosse Tete), Maringouin (Maringouin), Rosedale (Rosedale), White Castle (White Castle).

=== Colleges and universities ===
It is in the service area of South Louisiana Community College.

== National Guard ==
The Gillis W. Long Center, located on the outskirts of Carville, LA, is operated by the Louisiana Army National Guard. This post is home to the 415TH MI (Military Intelligence) Battalion, the 241ST MPAD, and the 61st Troop Command. The 415TH MI is a subunit of the 139TH RSG (regional support group).

== See also ==
- National Register of Historic Places listings in Iberville Parish, Louisiana
- Jessel Ourso, sheriff of Iberville Parish from 1964 to 1978; suspended, 1968-1972
- Edward J. Price, state representative for District 58, which includes Iberville Parish
