= Carville Historic District =

Historic district in Louisiana, United States

- U.S. National Register of Historic Places
- U.S. Historic district
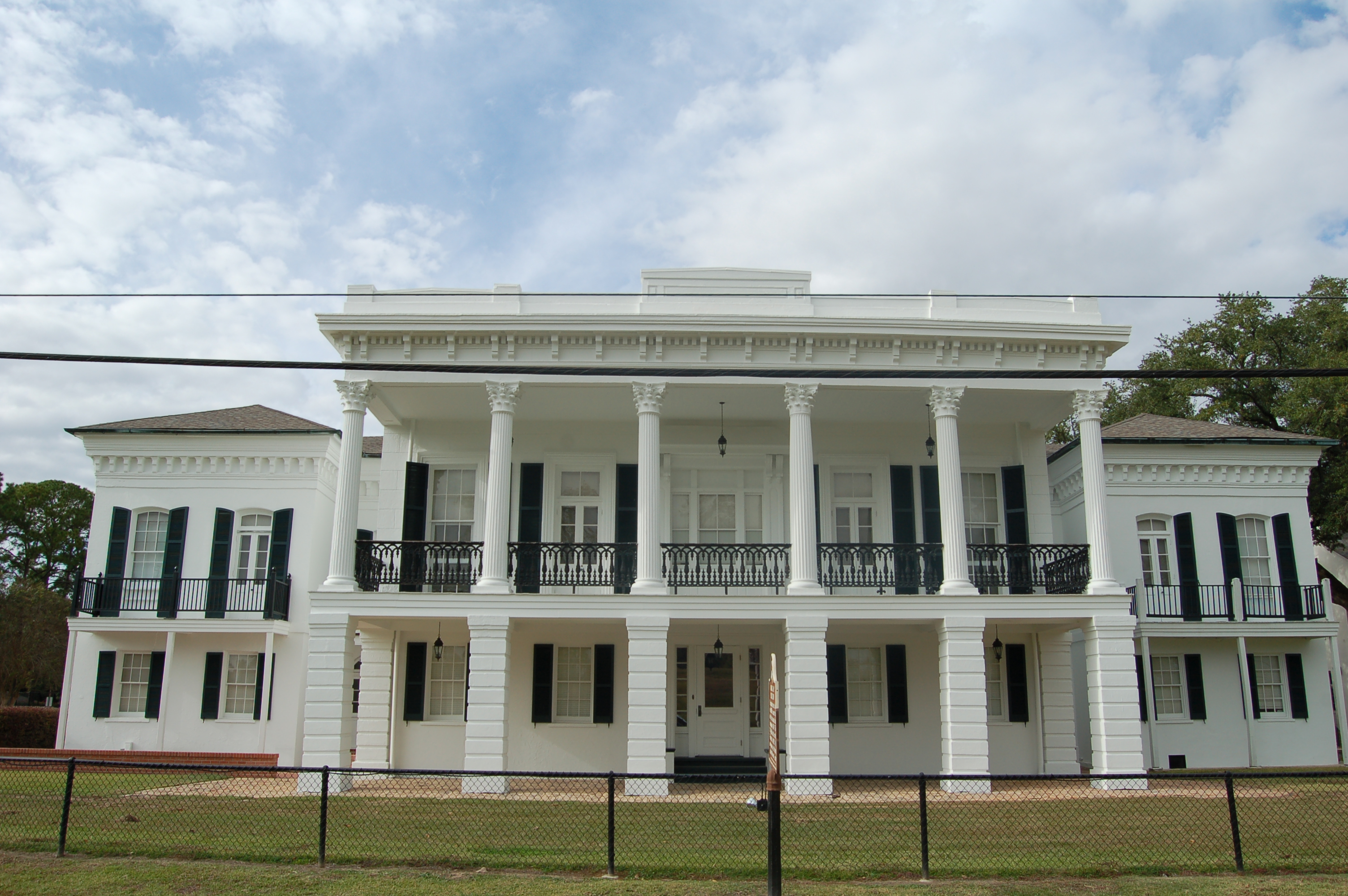
- The 1859 Indian Camp Plantation House

- Location within Louisiana Location within the United States
- Location: 5445 Point Clair Road, Carville, Louisiana
- Coordinates: 30°11′52″N 91°07′37″W
- Area: 60 acres (24 ha)
- Built: 1859, 1939-1941
- Architect: Neill P. Thompson; Henry Howard
- Architectural style: Classical Revival, Italianate
- NRHP reference No.: 92001529
- Added to NRHP: November 18, 1992

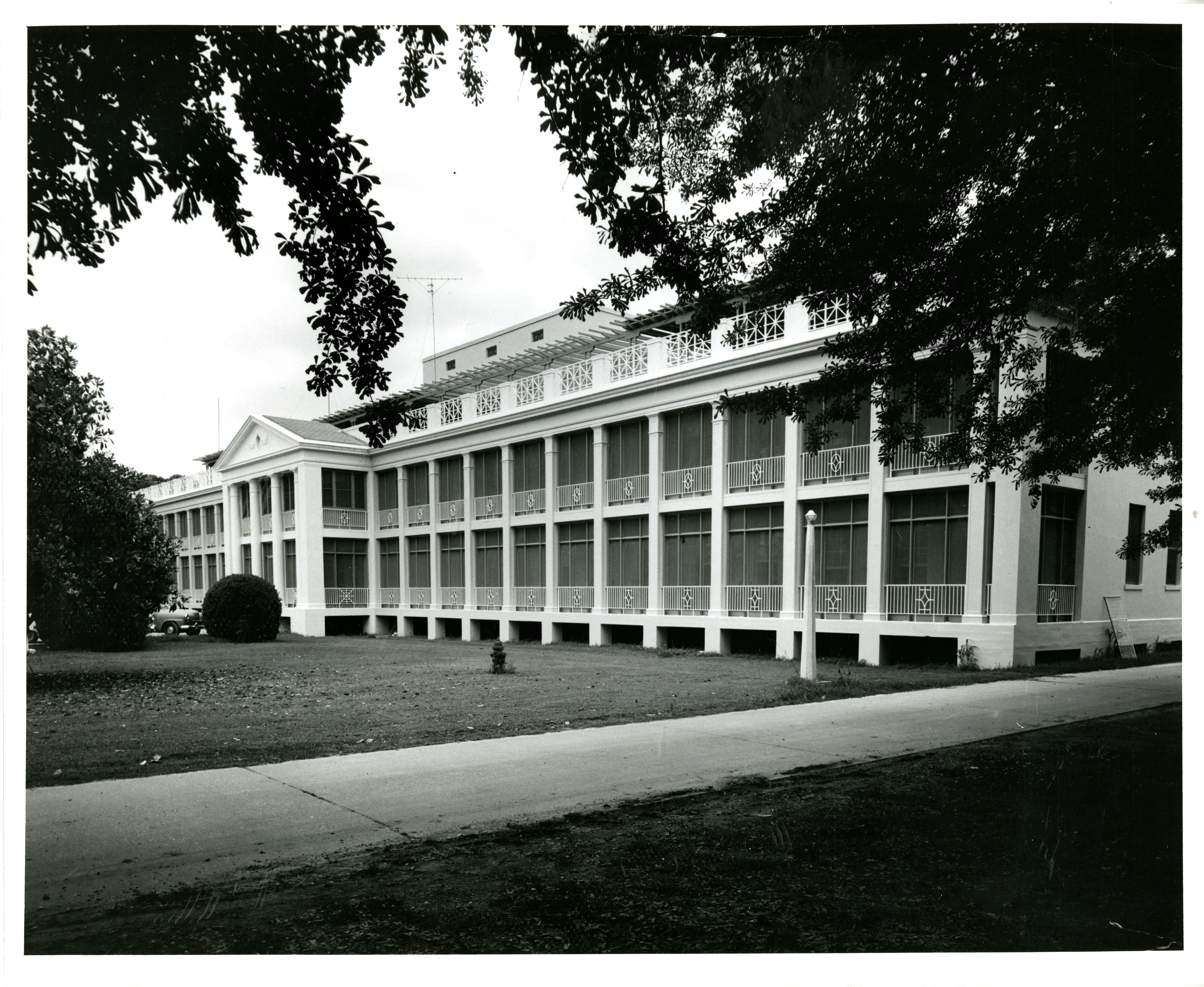
The patients' infirmary built 1933.

The Carville Historic District in Carville, Louisiana, is a 60-acre (24 ha) historic district that was listed on the National Register of Historic Places on November 18, 1992. It formerly served as a treatment facility for leprosy, and was called the National Leprosarium, Gillis W. Long Hansen's Disease Center and Public Health Service Hospital No. 66.

In 1992, the district included 24 contributing buildings and two contributing structures, most built during 1939–1941 by architect/builder Neill P. Thompson. It contains the National Hansen's Disease Museum, a historical museum about the facility.

== History ==
=== Plantation ===
The property was originally a sugar plantation. The main house was built in 1859 for sugar planter Robert C. Camp.

=== Louisiana Leper home ===
Located on the eastern bank of the Mississippi River in Carville, Louisiana, the National Leprosarium was one of two leprosy hospitals in the United States. An abandoned sugar plantation became the Louisiana Leper Home in 1894. Eventually the facility would develop into a hospital that promoted understanding, identification, and treatment of leprosy, also known as Hansen's disease. But in the early days, there was no effective medical treatment, and patients entered the gates under mandatory quarantine and many never left the hospital again. See Leprosy in Louisiana.

The "Home" began work with a patient load of five men and two women in the 1890s. Louisiana Leper Home was known as "a place of refuge, not reproach; a place of treatment and research, not detention". It offered hope and a comfortable refuge from society. Over the next century, the property would develop into a world class hospital, housing hundreds of employees and patients, including married couples and children.

=== National Leprosarium ===
In 1921, the U.S. Public Health Service took control and the facility became U.S. Marine Hospital Number 66, the National Leprosarium of the United States. Patient Stanley Stein, known as "Carville's Crusader", began a two-page newsletter in 1931. It grew into The STAR, a world-renowned newspaper that is still in publication.

When the U.S. Public Health Service Hospital system was abolished in 1981, the National Leprosarium was the only hospital that escaped transfer to another organization. This was due to the efforts of United States Congressman Gillis W. Long. He was an advocate for people living and working with Hansen's disease. Long was successful in lobbying Congress to keep Carville open for the patients who wanted to remain on site, even though mandatory quarantine ceased to be law some years before. In 1986, the facility became the Gillis W. Long Hansen's Disease (Leprosy) Center; the name change was directly linked to Congressman Long's influence in keeping the hospital open.

In 1992, the Carville Historic District was established and in 1996 the National Hansen's Disease (Leprosy) Museum was founded.

=== Closure ===
The U.S. Congress passed a bill to relocate the Gillis W. Long Hansen's Disease (Leprosy) Center to Baton Rouge, Louisiana, and as of 1999 the National Hansen's Disease Programs continues its clinical care and research for Hansen's disease in Baton Rouge.

The Federal Government returned the site to the State of Louisiana in 1999. The state of Louisiana created a military base where the Louisiana National Guard currently operates a boot-camp style school for at-risk youth. There are other military and government tenants onsite. In addition to the museum, up until 2015, the grounds remained home to a few elderly residents who chose to stay after the hospital's official closing.

The Foundation for Historical Louisiana currently lists the site on its Treasures in Trouble list stating that many structures require extensive repairs and maintenance.

== National Hansen's Disease Museum ==
National Hansen's Disease Museum (USA)
- Established: 1996
- Location: 5445 Point Clair Rd; Carville, Louisiana 70721
- Coordinates: 30.195654°N 91.125682°W
- Curator: Elizabeth Schexnyder
- Website: http://www.hrsa.gov/hansens-disease/museum

The National Hansen’s Disease Museum's exhibits include a history of the Carville facility, the United States Public Health Service and Daughters of Charity of St. Vincent de Paul who cared for the residents. Other exhibits include a recreated 1940s-era patient's room, stories of patients, their daily lives as residents and the problems they faced and information on Hansen's disease and advances in treatment.

Other archival collections include photos and records of the Daughters of Charity who worked as nurses, teachers, researchers, medical librarians, and pharmacists from 1896 to 2005; The 66 Star a bi-monthly patient newsletter issued between 1931 and 1934 and its successor, The STAR, which began publication in 1941 and continues today. The archives also holds copies of The Question Mark, a student newsletter that began in the 1940s and The Point Clarion, the employee newsletter.

The property also includes a chapel which is still in operation called the Sacred Heart Chapel and it is a secondary church to St. Gabriel Catholic Church.

== Architecture ==
The "anchor" for the Carville Historic District is the Indian Camp Plantation House, the antebellum main house of a sugar plantation which is the only surviving building from the plantation. It was

designed and built by New Orleans architect Henry Howard (and perhaps his partner Albert Diettel) in 1859 for sugar planter Robert C. Camp. It is a raised stucco over brick transitional Greek Revival Italianate mansion featuring a central mass with a hexastyle double gallery and flanking two-story wings. Fluted Corinthian columns over heavily rusticated pillars support the gallery. Column capitals are correctly fashioned from double rows of acanthus leaf carvings with volutess or scrolls springing from the centers. Rather thin, molded and decorated abacus blocks supply the transition from columns to architrave. / The façade is well detailed with Italianate features, including rows of brackets, segmental openings, and panels. Above the gallery is a busy entablature with a bracketed, dentiled frieze under a projecting cornice and a segmented, paneled parapet. The bracket and dentil motif of the principal frieze continues around the returning entablature to terminate at the juncture of the house and gallery, only to reappear in a modified form of elongated brackets spaced across the wings, down the sides, and onto the rear. Meanwhile, the square, post and lintel fenestration of the central block contrasts with segmental openings in the wings. These features, together with the deep rustication of the central pillars and the heavy cast-iron gallery railings, impart a heavy sculptural quality to the façade. From every angle, front and rear, a certain dynamism emerges from broken up surfaces and contrasting motifs.

=== Contributing properties ===
The historical district contains a total of 26 contributing properties, built between 1859 and 1941:

- 1939-1941 buildings. This entry comprises several buildings:
  - North and South Quadrangles of patient quarters 30°11′59″N 91°07′34″W and 30°11′54″N 91°07′28″W
  - Laundry 30°11′52″N 91°07′32″W
  - Sisters of Charity Quarters 30°11′47″N 91°07′32″W
  - Medical Records Building 30°11′48″N 91°07′34″W.
- Old Dining Hall/Cafeteria, 30°11′56″N 91°07′31″W. Built 1923.
- Infirmary, 30°11′55″N 91°07′34″W. Built 1934.
- Protestant Chapel, 30°11′48″N 91°07′29″W. Built 1934.
- Catholic Chapel, 30°11′49″N 91°07′31″W. Built 1924.
- Isolation Building, 30°11′57″N 91°07′37″W. Built 1936.
- Power Plant, 30°11′52″N 91°07′31″W. Built 1924.
- Water Treatment Facility, 30°11′50″N 91°07′35″W.
- Greenhouse, 30°11′50″N 91°07′30″W.
- Greenhouse/Supply House, 30°11′46″N 91°07′34″W.
- Indian Camp Plantation House, 30°11′45″N 91°07′33″W. Built 1859.
- Gatehouse, 30°11′44″N 91°07′34″W.
- Training Building, 30°11′48″N 91°07′42″W.
- Unstyled Building No. 1, 30°11′50″N 91°07′38″W.
- Unstyled Building No. 2, 30°11′51″N 91°07′33″W.
- Staff Quarters No. 1, 30°11′44″N 91°07′36″W. Built between 1920s and 1930s.
- Staff Quarters No. 2, 30°11′42″N 91°07′38″W. Built between 1920s and 1930s.
- Staff Quarters No. 3, 30°11′41″N 91°07′40″W. Built between 1920s and 1930s.
- Staff Quarters No. 4, 30°11′40″N 91°07′41″W. Built between 1920s and 1930s.
- Staff Quarters No. 5, 30°11′39″N 91°07′43″W. Built between 1920s and 1930s.
- Staff Quarters No. 6, 30°11′47″N 91°07′38″W. Built between 1920s and 1930s.
- Staff Quarters No. 7, 30°11′45″N 91°07′40″W. Built between 1920s and 1930s.
- Staff Quarters No. 8, 30°11′44″N 91°07′42″W. Built between 1920s and 1930s.
- Staff Quarters No. 9, 30°11′43″N 91°07′44″W. Built between 1920s and 1930s.
- Staff Quarters No. 10, 30°11′42″N 91°07′45″W. Built between 1920s and 1930s.
- Garage, 30°11′40″N 91°07′43″W. Built between 1920s and 1930s.

== See also ==
- List of hospitals in Louisiana
- List of plantations in Louisiana
- National Register of Historic Places listings in Iberville Parish, Louisiana
