= Plaquemine Ferry =

Ferry in Louisiana, United States

Coordinates: 30.284°N 91.216°W

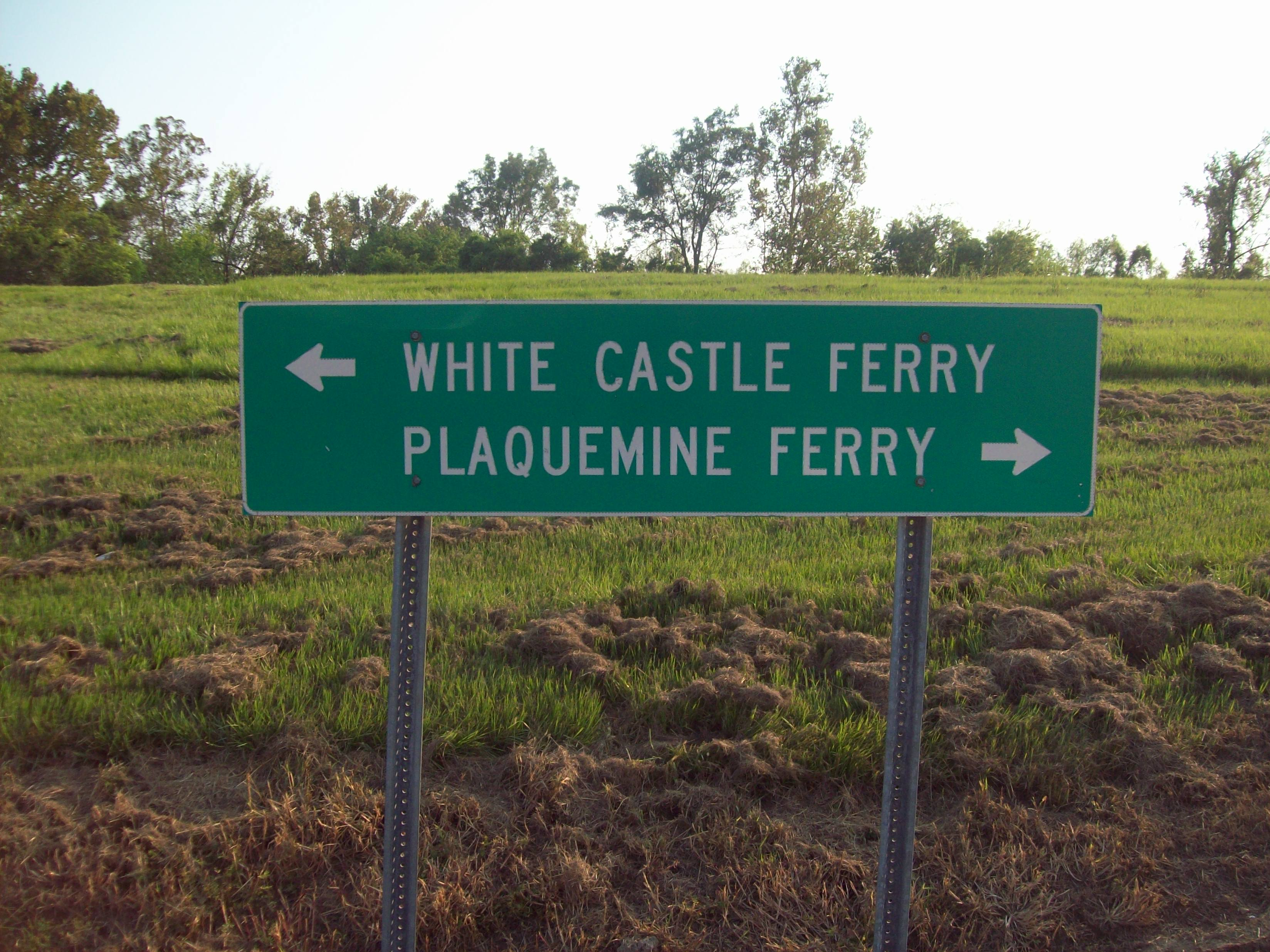
Sign showing the Plaquemine Ferry and White Castle Ferry

The Plaquemine Ferry is a ferry across the Mississippi River in the U.S. state of Louisiana, connecting Plaquemine and Sunshine. The ferry has a current capacity of 35 standard vehicles and operates on the half hour schedule.

== See also ==
- List of crossings of the Lower Mississippi River
