= Brittany, Louisiana =

Unincorporated community in Louisiana, U.S.

Coordinates: 30°12′44″N 90°52′53″W

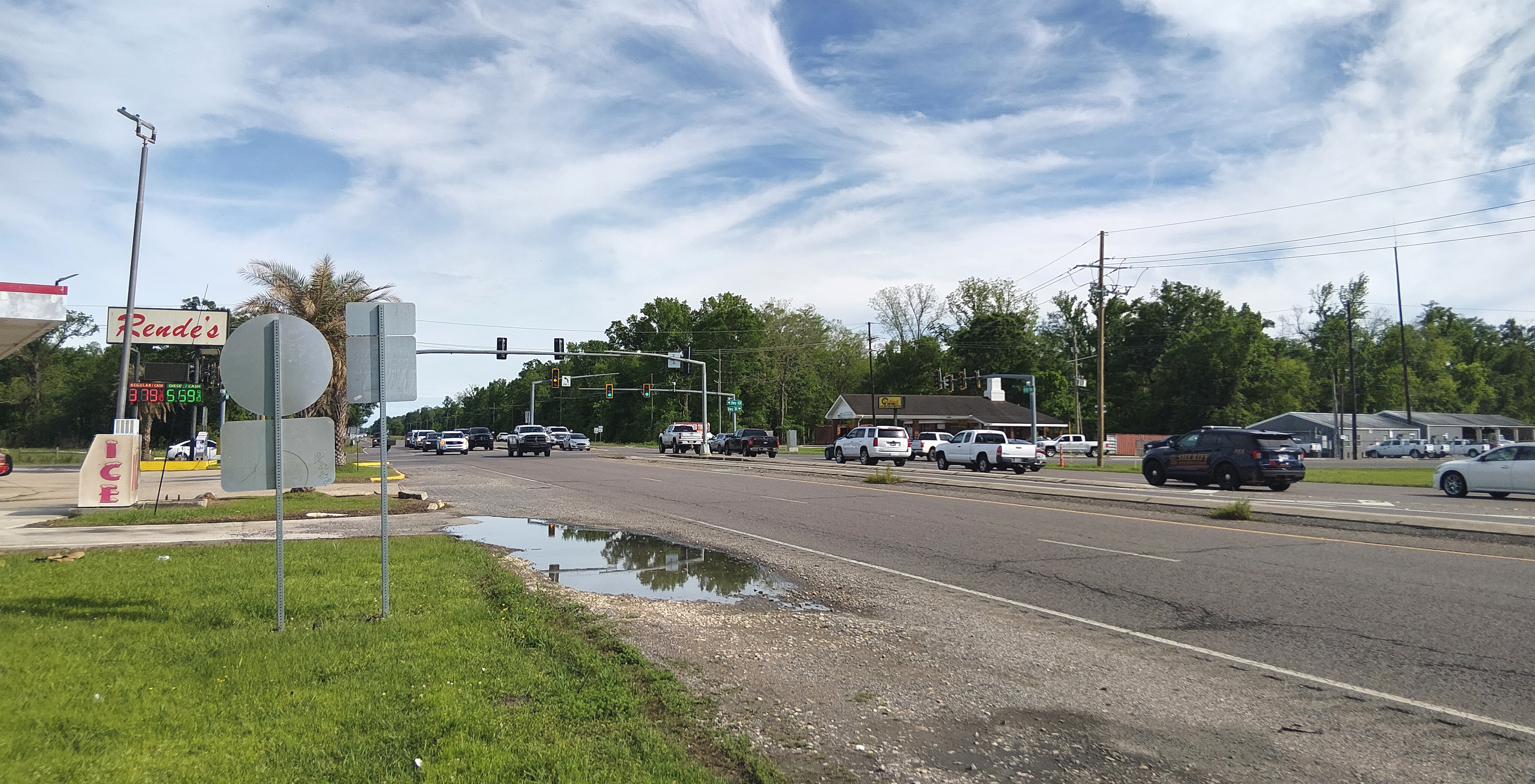
Airline Highway in Brittany, Louisiana

Brittany is an unincorporated community in Ascension Parish, Louisiana, in the United States.

== History ==
The community of Brittany was originally called The Burn. Around 1907 the LR&N railroad was built and a flag stop was made in this community. A year or so after a post office was established and it became necessary to choose a name for it. George W. Rice was the first postmaster. According to Mrs. W. J. Sevario, "he asked my mother, Mrs. S. S. Ferguson, to suggest a name. My mother suggested 'Brittany' and it was chosen. As far as I can remember she chose it because she liked the sound of it and it was uncommon." (The Brittany post office was established on February 5, 1908, and is still operating. The Brittany post office has a zip code of 70718.)

Around the time the post office was established, a small sawmill called "Hopper's" was built in the 5th ward (Ascension Parish), and a spur line from the railroad to the mill was laid to haul logs and lumber to and from the mill. Later, Sidney St. Amant built a small sawmill near the J. De Haas. None of these mills are in existence anymore. The only industry now is the Alexander Step Factory (now Alexander Concrete Products) at the site of the old Hopper sawmill.

There was an elementary school built on land donated by J. H. Dyer and from timber donated by people in the community. This was at first a one-room school. Later another room was added. The school continued for twenty or twenty-five years. Most of the children now go to East Ascension High School but some go to St. Amant. High School.

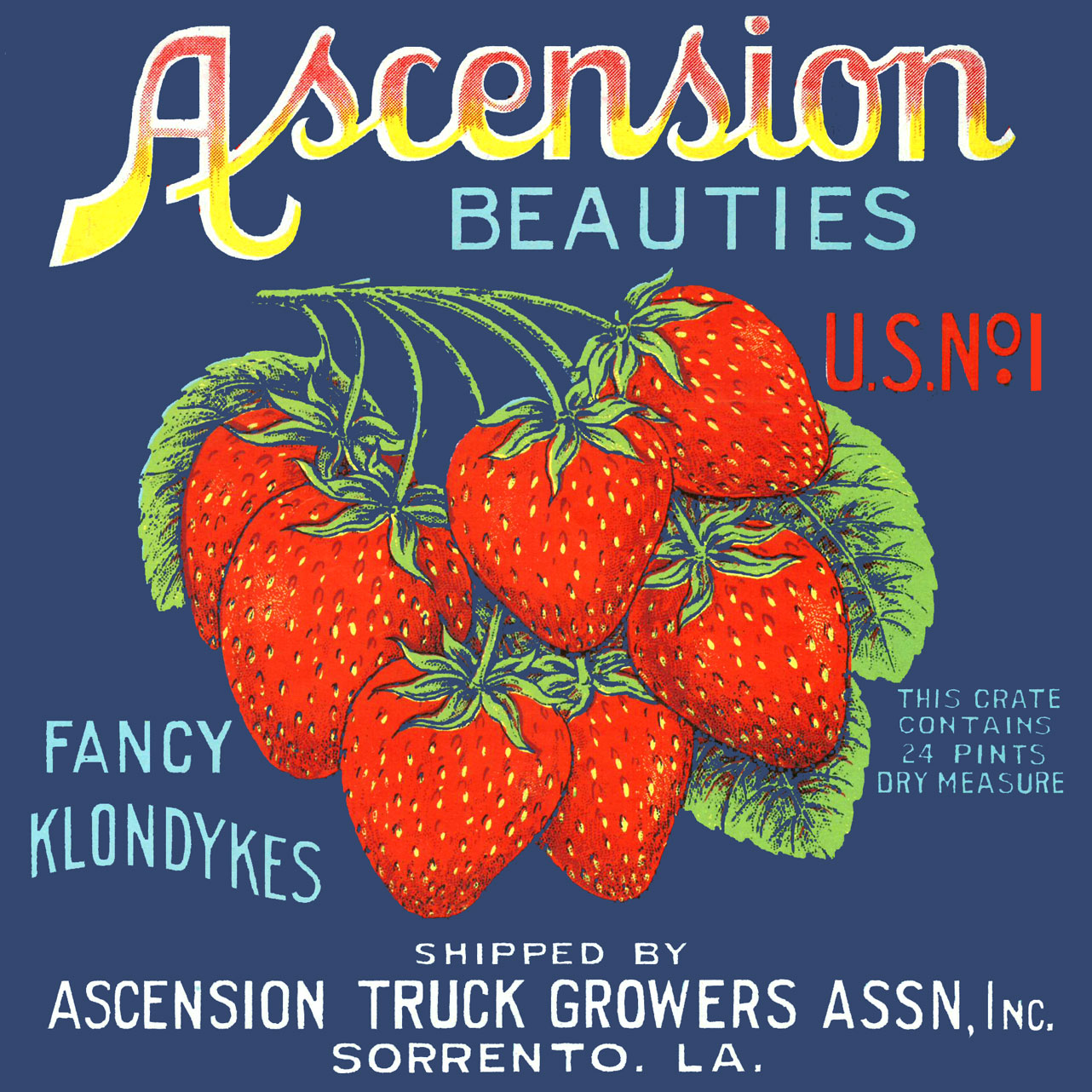
Circa 1920 strawberry crate label from Fabled Labels Archive

The area was homesteaded circa 1900 by a few related families who were mostly truck farmers. The main commercial crops were sugarcane and strawberries.

For a number of years, there were Catholic, Baptist, and Latter-day Saint churches in Brittany. All three no longer stand, though the Latter-day Saint chapel was eventually replaced and relocated to Louisiana Highway 30 in Brittany.

Some of the early settlers were Joseph Richardson, Charles G. Fridge, John Paxton, S. S. Ferguson, William Hurst, W. W. Hodgeson, Aidy Hudson, Joseph Brignac, Eugene Causey, J. J. Gonzales, Mike and Jim Savario, George W. Rice, Ernest Floyd, E. Clouatre, and Rene Bercegeay.

For many years after the roads were established, they were nearly impassable during a rainy season. They were later replaced with gravel and black-topped roads.

== Today ==
Brittany (zip code 70718) is located between Gonzales (zip code 70737) and Sorrento (zip code 70778). All three communities have always been closely linked by the railroad line and the Airline Highway (US Route 61) linking Baton Rouge and New Orleans.

Mrs. S. S. Ferguson, the "namer" of Brittany, was Mary Alice Acy Ferguson. She had two sisters who also homesteaded with their families in Brittany circa 1900. All three sisters had large families and descendants of fifth and sixth generations of those sisters live in Brittany today.

There are Christian Assembly, Lutheran, Divine Grace, and Latter-Day Saints meeting houses in Brittany. The majority of the inhabitants are Baptist or Catholic. The community has around five hundred residents.
