= Bayou Sorrel, Louisiana =

- Unincorporated community
- Location within Louisiana Location within the United States
- Coordinates: 30°09′43″N 91°20′08″W
- Country: United States
- State: Louisiana
- Parish: Iberville
- Elevation: 3 ft (0.91 m)
- Time zone: UTC-6 (Central (CST))
  - Summer (DST): UTC-5 (CDT)
- Area code: 225
- GNIS feature ID: 542965

Bayou Sorrel is an unincorporated community in Iberville Parish, Louisiana, United States.

Bayou Sorrel is also known as "down the bayou" or as some people like to say "sol".
