= Sunshine, Louisiana =

Human settlement in Louisiana, US

Coordinates: 30°17′03″N 91°07′38″W

Sunshine is a populated place in Iberville Parish, Louisiana, United States. The community is now partially within the city limits of St. Gabriel. Located approximately 15 miles south of Baton Rouge along the Mississippi River, the community was originally named Forlorn Hope by inhabitants, but was given its current name by Oscar Richard, Sr., who was the post master of the Forlorn Hope, La., post office. He petitioned the federal government for permission to change the name of the post office to Sunshine in order to give it a more uplifting name. As frequently happens, the villages took the name of the local post office; hence, the name of the village and community became known as Sunshine. Much of the community was annexed to St. Gabriel in 1987, excluding a peninsula along the river.

The ZIP Code for Sunshine is 70780.

== Sunshine grass ==
The "Sunshine" type of vetiver grass, whose roots have long been used in Louisiana as an insect repellent, was given that name by the USDA in 1989 for Sunshine, Louisiana, where Eugene LeBlanc Sr. grew a heritage clone given to his grandparents by Felix Perilloux, who in turn had acquired it from his wife Myrthee Froisy Perilloux in the 1860s. Vetiver was clonally introduced throughout the tropics in the 19th century, and DNA fingerprinting has shown that almost all the vetiver grown worldwide for perfumery, agriculture, and bioengineering is essentially the same nonfertile cultigen as Sunshine. This type of essential-oil vetiver is known by various names in different locations (e.g., 'Monto' in Australia), but because "Sunshine" was the earliest name used in modern times, that is how it is collectively known throughout the world today.

== Notable people ==
Sunshine is the hometown of Shelby Bordelon, who was crowned Miss Louisiana 2026. She placed first runner-up at Miss America 2027, held on September 6, 2026.
