= Carville, Louisiana =

Coordinates: 30°13′03″N 91°05′46″W

Carville
- Neighborhood
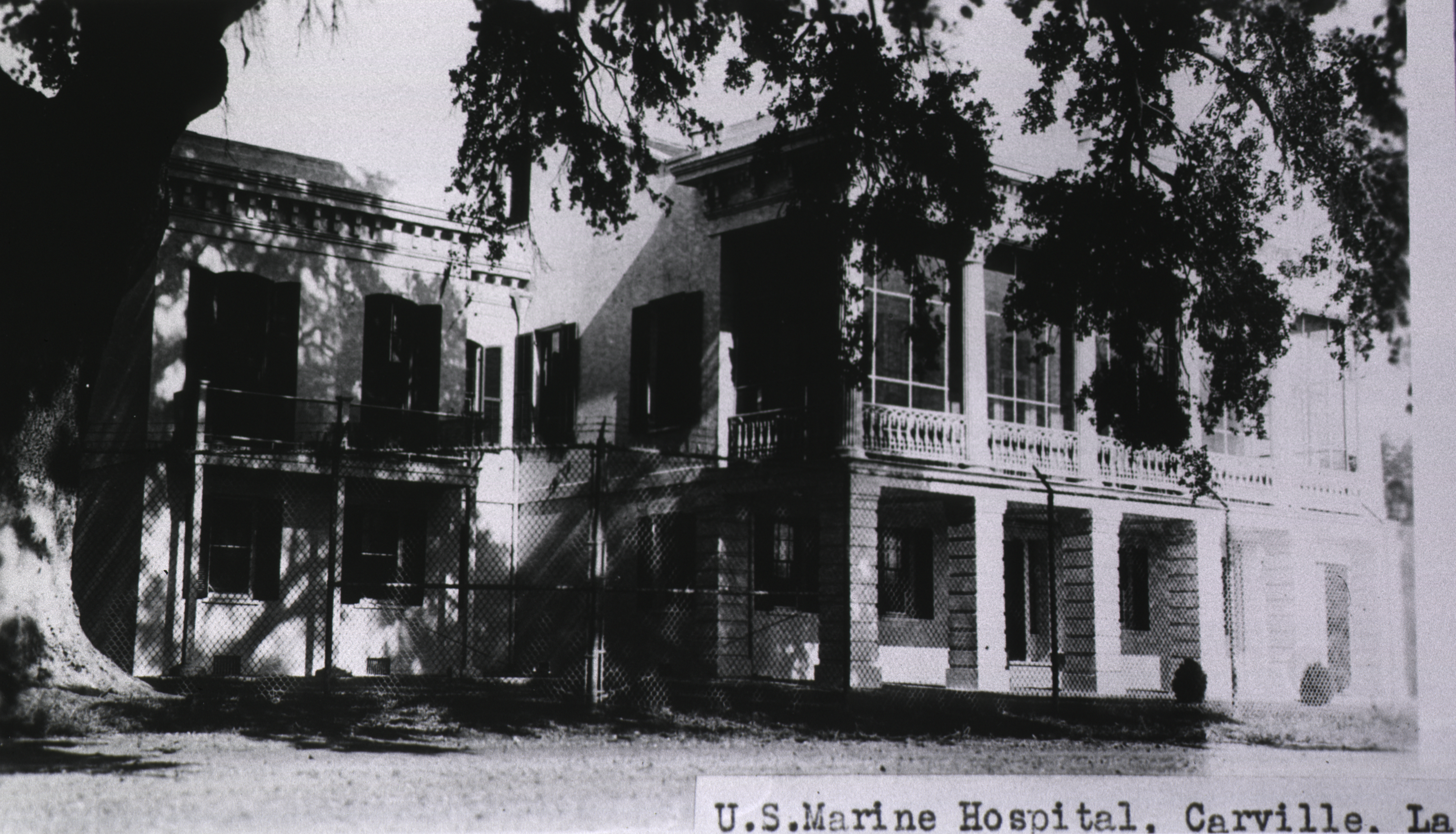
- Interactive map of Carville
- Country: United States
- State: Louisiana
- Parish: Iberville Parish
- City: San Gabriel
- The community is renamed "Carville": 1909

Population
  - Total: 700
  - Density: 55/sq mi (21/km^{2})
- Zip code: 70721

Carville is a neighborhood of St. Gabriel, located in Iberville Parish in southern Louisiana, sixteen miles south of Baton Rouge, on the Mississippi River. Best known as the childhood hometown of political consultant James Carville, it is also known for its sixty-five-year history as the only place in America to treat leprosy until outpatient treatment became viable in 1981. Nowadays, that legacy is celebrated at the National Hansen’s Disease Museum, which educates visitors about the condition.

== Name ==
The area was renamed for James Carville's grandfather postmaster Louis Arthur Carville in 1909, to differentiate the area — formerly called "Island" — from the many other places in Louisiana with that name.

== Carville National Leprosarium ==
"In 1917, on February 3rd, Senate Bill number 4086, an act to establish a National Leprosarium in Carville, Louisiana, [was] passed by the US Senate." The result was a U.S. Public Health Service hospital named "Carville National Leprosarium," and dedicated to treating leprosy. It underwent several name changes throughout its history, including Louisiana Leper Home, U.S. Marine Hospital No. 66 (1921), and Gillis W. Long Hansen's Disease Center (1986).

The former site of the long-closed hospital has been known as the Gillis W. Long Center since 1986. Named for the late U.S. Representative Gillis William Long, a Democrat from Louisiana's 8th congressional district, it is operated by the Louisiana Army National Guard, and the facility now includes the National Hansen’s Disease Museum.
