= Dutchtown, Louisiana =

Dutchtown
- Unincorporated community
- Location of Dutchtown in Louisiana
- Coordinates: 30°15′16″N 90°59′19″W
- Country: United States
- State: Louisiana
- Parish: Ascension
- Elevation: 13 ft (4.0 m)
- Time zone: UTC-6 (CST)
  - Summer (DST): UTC-5 (CDT)
- Area code: 225

Dutchtown is an unincorporated community of Ascension Parish, Louisiana, United States.
