= Geismar, Louisiana =

Geismar
- Location within Louisiana
- Coordinates: 30.204°N 91.022°W
- Country: United States
- State: Louisiana
- Parish: Ascension
- Elevation: 23 ft (7.0 m)
- Time zone: UTC-6 (CST)
  - Summer (DST): UTC-5 (CDT)
- ZIP code: 70734
- Area code: 225

Geismar is an unincorporated community in Ascension Parish, Louisiana, United States and is at the heart of Louisiana's chemical corridor. The community is part of the Baton Rouge metropolitan statistical area. Geismar is south of Prairieville and west of Gonzales. The community has Three schools, Dutchtown Primary School, Dutchtown Middle School and Dutchtown High School, which are ranked among the top schools in the state of Louisiana. The Mississippi River flows to the southeast along the southwest side of the community. The area is vulnerable to hurricanes and tropical systems due to its low elevation and its proximity to the coast of southeast Louisiana.

== 2013 explosion at Williams Olefins plant ==
On the morning of June 13, 2013, an explosion occurred at the Williams Olefins plant in Geismar. The plant produces 1.3 billion pounds of ethylene and 90 million pounds of polymer grade propylene annually. Over 70 people were injured in the explosion, and two people were killed.

== Notable people ==
- Troy E. Brown, former member of the Louisiana State Senate; resides in Napoleonville and Geismar
- Juba Diez, former member of the Louisiana House of Representatives from Ascension Parish; graduated from Dutchtown High School in Geismar
- Malaika Favorite, visual artist; first African-American to attend Ascension Parish high school
- Eddie Lacy, running back for the Green Bay Packers; graduated from Dutchtown High School
- Landon Collins, safety for the New York Giants; graduated from Dutchtown High School
- Eric Reid, safety for the Carolina Panthers; graduated from Dutchtown High School
- Justin Reid, safety for the Kansas City Chiefs; graduated from Dutchtown High School
