= St. Gabriel, Louisiana =

- City
- City of St. Gabriel
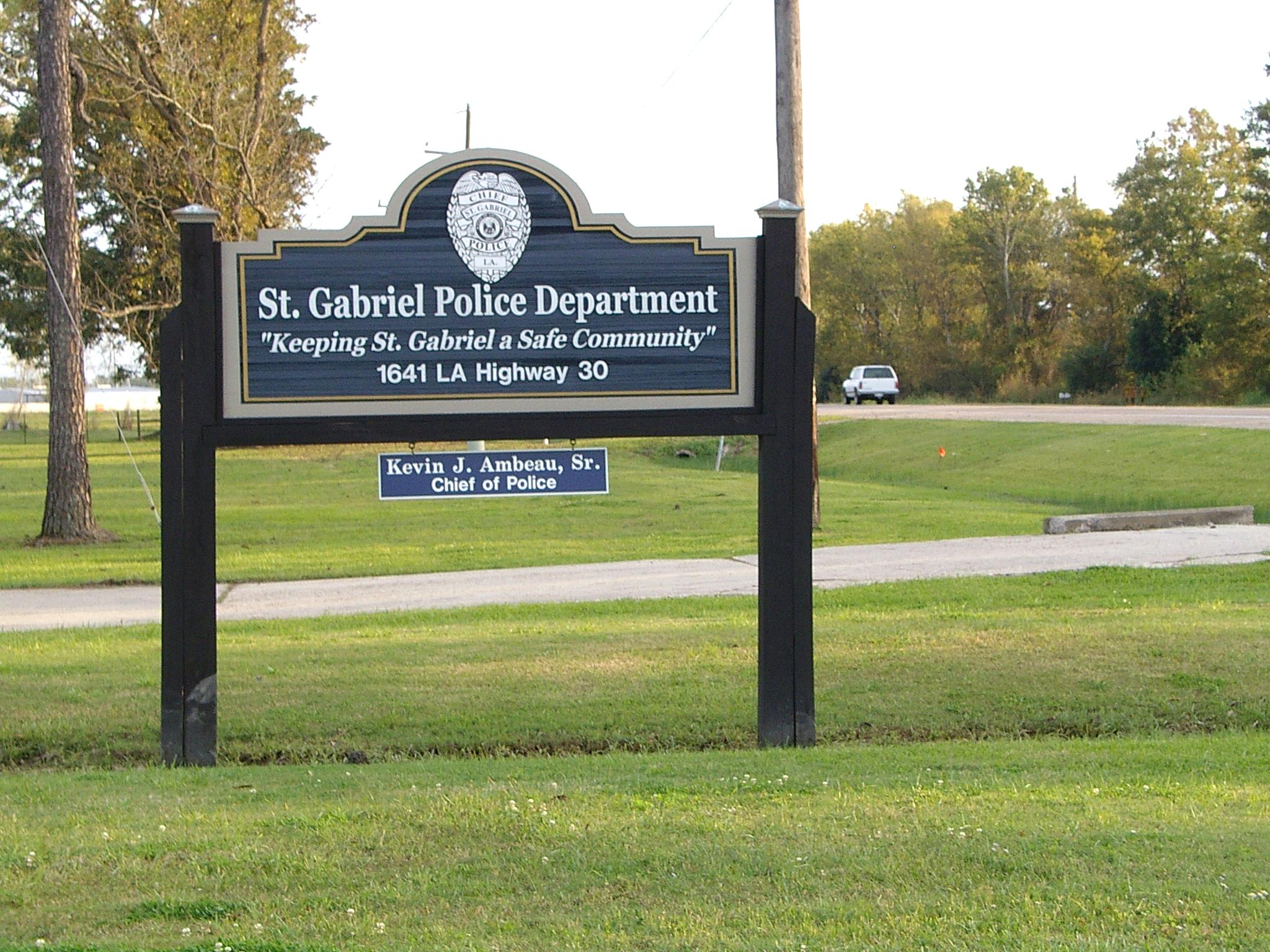
- St. Gabriel Police Department

- Location of St. Gabriel in Iberville Parish, Louisiana.

- Location of Louisiana in the United States
- Coordinates: 30°15′13″N 91°06′25″W
- Country: United States
- State: Louisiana
- Parish: Iberville
- Incorporated: 1994 (town)
- City Designation: 2001

Area
  - Total: 29.88 sq mi (77.39 km^{2})
  - Land: 29.66 sq mi (76.81 km^{2})
  - Water: 0.22 sq mi (0.58 km^{2})
- Elevation: 16 ft (4.9 m)

Population (2020)
  - Total: 6,433
  - Density: 216.9/sq mi (83.75/km^{2})
- Time zone: UTC-6 (CST)
  - Summer (DST): UTC-5 (CDT)
- ZIP Codes: 70721, 70776, 70780
- Area code: 225
- FIPS code: 22-67250
- GNIS feature ID: 2405394
- Website: http://www.cityofstgabriel.us

St. Gabriel is a city in Iberville Parish, Louisiana, United States. The city of St. Gabriel includes the Carville neighborhood and portions of Sunshine. Part of the Baton Rouge metropolitan statistical area, it had a population of 6,677 at the 2010 U.S. census, and 6,433 at the 2020 census.

St. Gabriel was incorporated as a town in 1994 and received city designation in 2001. It is located on the east bank of the Mississippi River, approximately 12 miles south of Baton Rouge. Bayou Manchac serves as the official boundary between St. Gabriel, Ascension Parish, and East Baton Rouge Parish. Over the years, the area has been transformed from a primarily agricultural economy to one that is now dominated by the petrochemical industry.

== History ==
This area is in a part of Acadiana, which was founded by the Acadians, after their expulsion from Nova Scotia in the mid-18th century.

At the end of 1769 Luis de Unzaga, then governor of New Orleans and from 1770 also of Louisiana, authorized Father Dragobert to create a parish for the Acadians on land near the Mississippi and located between Baton Rouge, Iberville and the town of Gonzales. Between 1771 and 1773, Governor Luis de Unzaga granted the land and the necessary permits for its construction; the construction could be carried out between 1774 and 1776, still within the period of the government of Luis de Unzaga.

In 2008 during Hurricane Gustav, St. Gabriel Catholic Church's steeple was destroyed. It is one of Louisiana's oldest churches, and tradition sets the date of the formation of the parish in 1769.

== Geography ==
According to the United States Census Bureau, the town has a total area of 29.0 square miles (75.0 km^{2}), of which 28.7 square miles (74.4 km^{2}) is land and 0.2 square mile (0.6 km^{2}) (0.76%) is water. St. Gabriel sits along the east bank of the Mississippi River, between the boundaries of Ascension Parish and East Baton Rouge Parish. The city is about 12 miles (19 km) east of Baton Rouge and about 70 miles (110 km) from New Orleans. The communities of Carville and part of Sunshine are within the city limits.

== Demographics ==
Historical population
Census	Pop.	Note	%±
2000	5,514		—
2010	6,677		21.1%
2020	6,433		−3.7%
2025 (est.)	6,987	▲	8.6%
U.S. Decennial Census

St. Gabriel city, Louisiana – Racial and ethnic composition Note: the US census treats Hispanic/Latino as an ethnic category. This table excludes Latinos from the racial categories and assigns them to a separate category. Hispanics/Latinos may be of any race.
Race / Ethnicity (NH = Non-Hispanic)	Pop 2000	Pop 2010	Pop 2020	% 2000	% 2010	% 2020
White alone (NH)	1,457	2,209	2,464	26.42%	33.08%	38.30%
Black or African American alone (NH)	3,956	4,219	3,095	71.74%	63.19%	48.11%
Native American or Alaska Native alone (NH)	3	7	3	0.05%	0.10%	0.05%
Asian alone (NH)	18	20	62	0.33%	0.30%	0.96%
Native Hawaiian or Pacific Islander alone (NH)	1	0	1	0.02%	0.00%	0.02%
Other race alone (NH)	2	3	28	0.04%	0.04%	0.44%
Mixed race or Multiracial (NH)	15	53	114	0.27%	0.79%	1.77%
Hispanic or Latino (any race)	62	166	666	1.12%	2.49%	10.35%
Total	5,514	6,677	6,433	100.00%	100.00%	100.00%

As of the 2020 United States census, there were 6,433 people, 1,635 households, and 962 families residing in the city. The population was 48.1% non-Hispanic Black, 38.3% non-Hispanic white, 0.5% non-Hispanic American Indian/Alaska Native, 1.0% non-Hispanic Asian, 0.4% non-Hispanic some other race, 1.8% non-Hispanic multiracial, and 10.4% Hispanic of any race. The sharp decline of the Black population in the 2020 Census is the result of the closure and the evacuation of the population of the Louisiana Correctional Institute for Women which sustained flooding damage in 2016.

At the 2000 United States census, there were 5,514 people, 898 households, and 639 families residing in the town. There were 898 households, out of which 35.6% had children under the age of 18 living with them, 39.0% were married couples living together, 26.9% had a female householder with no husband present, and 28.8% were non-families. 25.2% of all households were made up of individuals, and 7.7% had someone living alone who was 65 years of age or older. The average household size was 2.79 and the average family size was 3.36. In 2019, there were 1,635 households with an average of 2.53 people per household. St. Gabriel had a median age of 37.7, and 88.2% of the population were aged 18 and older.

In 2019, the median household income was $48,259, up from $25,352 at the 2000 census. The per capita income was $17,153, up from $8,952 in 2000. Males had a median income of $41,125 versus $34,313 for females, and 20.0% of the population lived at or below the poverty line.

== Government and infrastructure ==
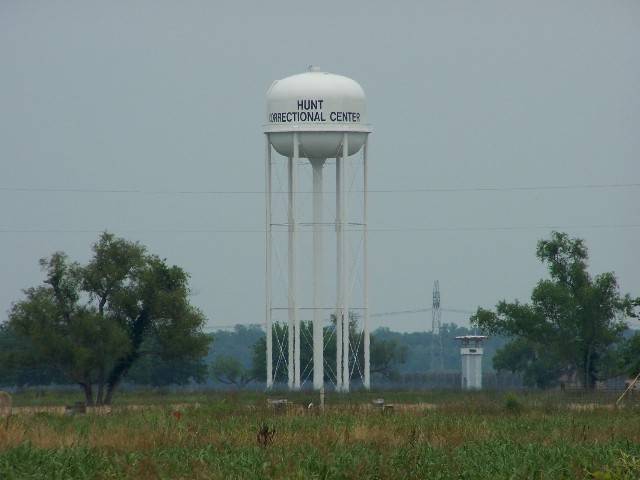
Elayn Hunt Correctional Center.

The Louisiana Department of Public Safety and Corrections operates two prisons, Elayn Hunt Correctional Center and Louisiana Correctional Institute for Women (LCIW), in St. Gabriel. LCIW houses the female death row.

== Education ==
=== Primary and secondary schools ===
Iberville Parish School Board operates the East Iberville School, a K–12 school, in St. Gabriel. For a long time it was the only school in St. Gabriel. The Mathematics, Science, and Arts Academy - East opened in St. Gabriel in the fall of 2008.

Some residents send their children to private schools in Greater Baton Rouge and in the Gonzales, Louisiana area.

In 2013 some officials from the City of St. Gabriel announced that they wished to secede from Iberville Parish schools, arguing that their schools were given less attention than warranted.

=== Public Library ===
Iberville Parish Library operates the East Iberville Branch Library in St. Gabriel.

== Notable people ==
Several notable people came from what is now St. Gabriel:

- James Carville, political consultant
- James Gallier, architect
