= National Register of Historic Places listings in Iberville Parish, Louisiana =

Location of Iberville Parish in Louisiana

This is a list of the National Register of Historic Places listings in Iberville Parish, Louisiana.

This is intended to be a complete list of the properties and districts on the National Register of Historic Places in Iberville Parish, Louisiana, United States. The locations of National Register properties and districts for which the latitude and longitude coordinates are included below, may be seen in a map.

There are 25 properties and districts listed on the National Register in the parish.

This National Park Service list is complete through NPS recent listings posted July 10, 2026.

== Current listings ==
	Name on the Register	Image	Date listed	Location	City or town	Description
1	Bagatelle Plantation House	Bagatelle Plantation House	May 9, 2007 (#07000424)	695 River Road (LA 991); 30°18′34″N 91°11′08″W	Sunshine	House relocated from St. James Parish to just outside St. Gabriel.
2	Bayou Paul Colored School	Bayou Paul Colored School	January 26, 2016 (#15001000)	915 Bayou Paul Road; 30°18′12″N 91°06′46″W	St. Gabriel	Building was moved in Amanda Grace Memorial Park in 2006 and is currently used as the Bayou Paul Colored School Museum.
3	Bayou Plaquemine Lock	Bayou Plaquemine Lock	May 19, 1972 (#72000554)	U.S. Government Reservation at the confluence of Bayou Plaquemine and the Mississippi River; 30°17′33″N 91°14′05″W	Plaquemine	Lock building is also part of Plaquemine Historic District since its creation on October 30, 1989.
4	Carville Historic District	Carville Historic District	November 18, 1992 (#92001529)	5445 Point Clair Road; 30°11′52″N 91°07′37″W	St. Gabriel	Federal and formerly state hospital addressing leprosy built mostly during 1939-1941 in the Carville neighborhood. Also includes Indian Camp Plantation House (1859) designed by Henry Howard.
5	Church of the Nativity	Church of the Nativity	August 11, 1982 (#82002775)	15615 Laurel Street; 30°26′42″N 91°27′08″W	Rosedale	
6	Desobry Building	Desobry Building	November 6, 1986 (#86003128)	58415 Court Street; 30°17′04″N 91°14′35″W	Plaquemine	
7	Andrew H. Gay House	Andrew H. Gay House	July 18, 1985 (#85001582)	1010 McDuffie Street; 30°18′09″N 91°14′25″W	Plaquemine	
8	Homestead Plantation Complex	Homestead Plantation Complex	November 6, 1986 (#86003129)	Along Bayou Road (LA 3066), about 2.9 miles (4.7 km) southwest of Plaquemine; 30°15′31″N 91°16′01″W	Plaquemine vicinity	Also known as Variety Plantation.
9	Iberville Parish Courthouse	Iberville Parish Courthouse	May 31, 1980 (#80001732)	57735 Main Street; 30°17′30″N 91°14′02″W	Plaquemine	Greek Revival 1848 former parish courthouse serves today as the Iberville Museum. Also part of Plaquemine Historic District since its creation on October 30, 1989.
10	Live Oaks Plantation	Live Oaks Plantation	November 20, 1974 (#74000924)	Along LA 77, about 435 yards (398 m) northwest of intersection with LA 76; 30°26′36″N 91°27′23″W	Rosedale	
11	Louis S. Lozano House		April 21, 2021 (#100006452)	23730 Eden St. 30°17′15″N 91°14′00″W	Plaquemine	
12	Lucky Plantation House	Lucky Plantation House	December 27, 2002 (#02001603)	1295 River Road (LA 75); 30°17′12″N 91°11′52″W	Sunshine	Located just outside St. Gabriel.
13	Nottoway Plantation House	Nottoway Plantation House	June 6, 1980 (#80001733)	31025 LA 1; 30°11′11″N 91°10′01″W	White Castle vicinity	
14	Plaquemine High School	Plaquemine High School	February 13, 1992 (#92000041)	58060 Plaquemine Street; 30°17′20″N 91°14′16″W	Plaquemine	
15	Plaquemine Historic District	Plaquemine Historic District	October 30, 1989 (#89001791)	Railroad Avenue, Main Street, Eden Street, Church Street, Plaquemine Street and Court Street; 30°17′24″N 91°14′11″W	Plaquemine	Boundaries were increased on June 3, 2005.
16	Pierre Ernest Rivet House	Pierre Ernest Rivet House	November 17, 2001 (#01001235)	58159 Plaquemine Street; 30°17′16″N 91°14′20″W	Plaquemine	
17	St. Basil's Academy	St. Basil's Academy	October 5, 1982 (#82000439)	23515 Church Street; 30°17′25″N 91°14′00″W	Plaquemine	Also part of Plaquemine Historic District since its creation on October 30, 1989.
18	St. Gabriel Roman Catholic Church	St. Gabriel Roman Catholic Church	November 27, 1972 (#72000555)	3625 LA 75; 30°15′16″N 91°06′07″W	St. Gabriel	
19	St. John Baptist Church	St. John Baptist Church	January 21, 1994 (#93001549)	31925 Lacroix Road; 30°10′38″N 91°09′38″W	Dorseyville	
20	St. Louis Plantation	St. Louis Plantation	December 3, 1975 (#75000849)	Along St. Louis Road, about 325 yards (297 m) southwest of River Road (LA 405); 30°16′25″N 91°12′44″W	Plaquemine vicinity	Antebellum home of Italianate and Greek Revival style, located on a working sugar cane plantation.
21	Schexnayder House	Schexnayder House	January 19, 1989 (#88003224)	610 Pecan Drive; 30°18′43″N 91°05′56″W	St. Gabriel vicinity	
22	J. Supple's Sons Mercantile Company, Ltd.	J. Supple's Sons Mercantile Company, Ltd.	May 10, 2005 (#05000406)	29801-29899 River Road (LA 405); 30°12′29″N 91°10′12″W	Bayou Goula	
23	Tally-Ho Plantation House	Tally-Ho Plantation House	January 20, 1980 (#80001731)	Along River Road (LA 405); 30°12′11″N 91°10′14″W	Bayou Goula	
24	Towles-Musso House		July 10, 2024 (#100010517)	775 River Road; 30°18′33″N 91°11′48″W	St. Gabriel	
25	Trinity	Trinity	January 7, 1994 (#93001493)	Along LA 77, about 0.3 miles (0.48 km) southeast of its junction with LA 76; 30°26′13″N 91°27′05″W	Rosedale	

== See also ==
- List of National Historic Landmarks in Louisiana
- National Register of Historic Places listings in Louisiana
