= Edward J. Gay (politician, born 1816) =

American politician (1816–1889)

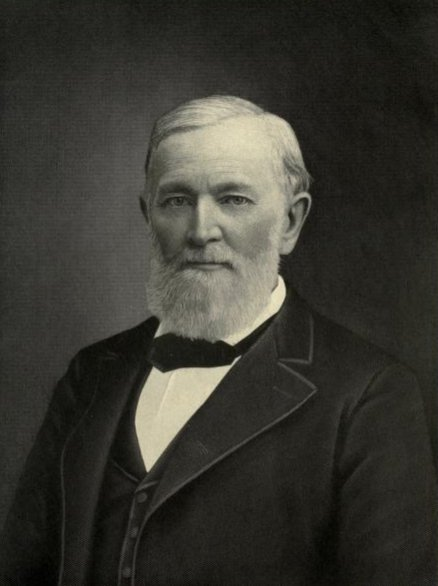

Member of the U.S. House of Representatives from Louisiana's 3rd district
- In office March 4, 1885 – May 30, 1889
- Preceded by: William P. Kellogg
- Succeeded by: Andrew Price

Personal details
- Born: February 3, 1816 Liberty, Virginia, United States
- Died: May 30, 1889 (aged 73) St. Louis Plantation, Louisiana, United States
- Resting place: Bellefontaine Cemetery
- Party: Democratic

Edward James Gay (February 3, 1816 – May 30, 1889) was a financier and member of United States Congress. He and his wife Lavinia Hynes were the grandparents of U.S. Senator Edward James Gay. He was a Democrat.

== Early history ==
Edward J. Gay was born at Liberty, Virginia on February 3, 1816. His family moved to Illinois in 1820, then four years later to St. Louis, Missouri. For several years he studied under a private teacher in Belleville, Illinois; he attended Augusta College in Kentucky from 1833–34 and returned to St. Louis, where he was engaged in commercial affairs from 1839 to 1860. Although he had no formal business education, Gay was a dedicated student of industrial and political economy from early adulthood.

From St. Louis he moved to Louisiana, where he became interested in manufacturing and planting. He was prominently connected with the erection of the Merchants Exchange Building in St. Louis, and he was the first president of the Louisiana Sugar Exchange of New Orleans.

Gay was originally opposed to secession from the Union, but once the American Civil War began, he stood firmly behind the Southern Confederacy.

== Political career ==
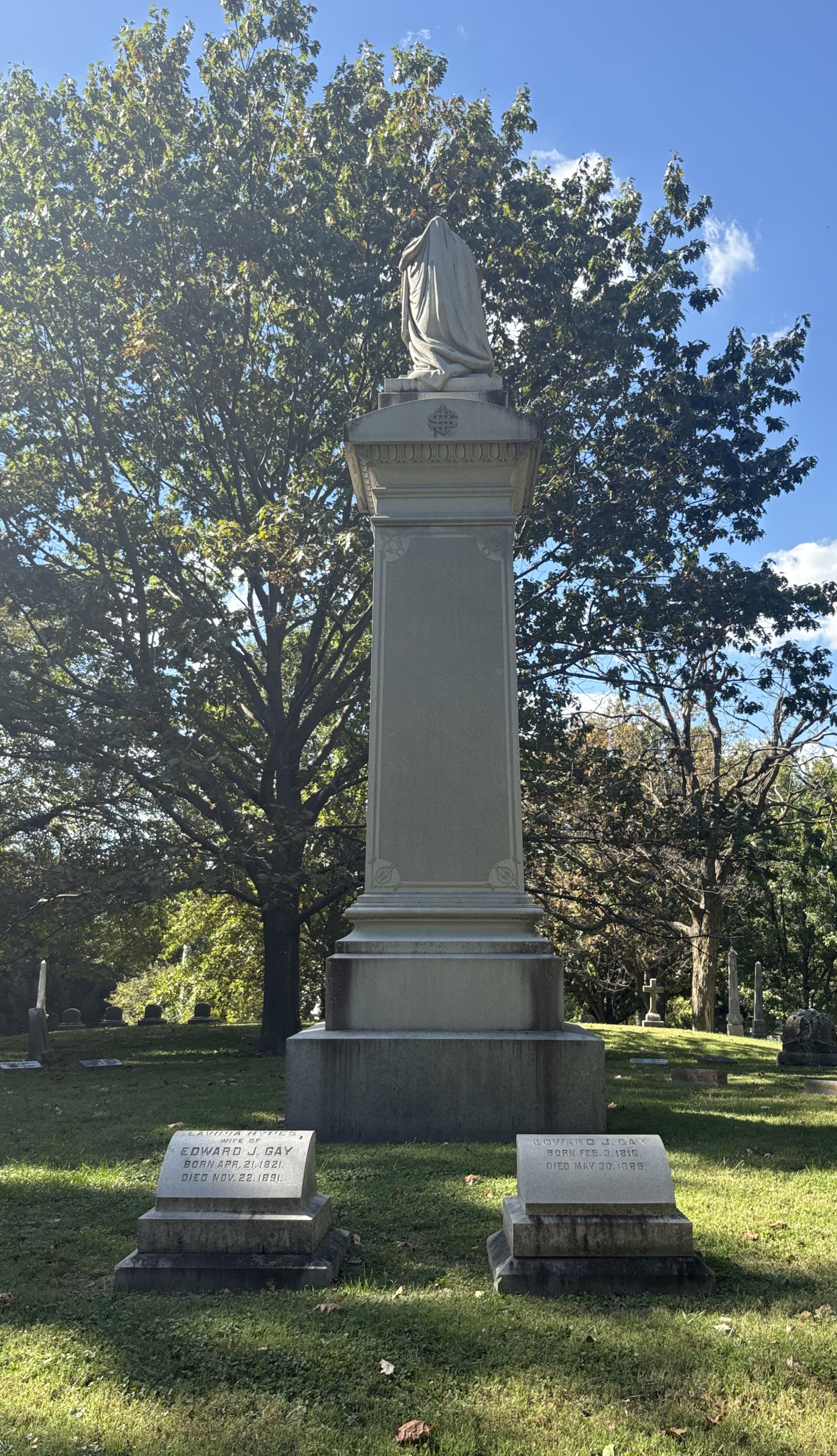
Gay's grave at Bellefontaine Cemetery

Although not inclined towards politics, Gay was persuaded in 1884 by his friends and associates to run for a seat in the U.S. House of Representatives. He defeated William Pitt Kellogg, whom he portrayed as the last carpetbagger in Louisiana, in the election and became a member of the 49th Congress as a Democrat. He was re-elected to the 50th and 51st Congresses.

Gay died at his home, the Saint Louis Plantation in Iberville Parish, on May 30, 1889, while still in office. He was buried at Bellefontaine Cemetery in St. Louis.

His St. Louis Plantation was added to the National Register of Historic Places in 1975.

== See also ==
- List of members of the United States Congress who died in office (1790–1899)
- Acadia Plantation, in Lafourche Parish
- Magnolia Mound Plantation House, in East Baton Rouge Parish

U.S. House of Representatives
Preceded by William P. Kellogg	Member of the U.S. House of Representatives from Louisiana's 3rd congressional district March 4, 1885 – May 30, 1889	Succeeded by Andrew Price
