= Plaquemine Historic District =

Historic district in Louisiana, United States

- U.S. National Register of Historic Places
- U.S. Historic district
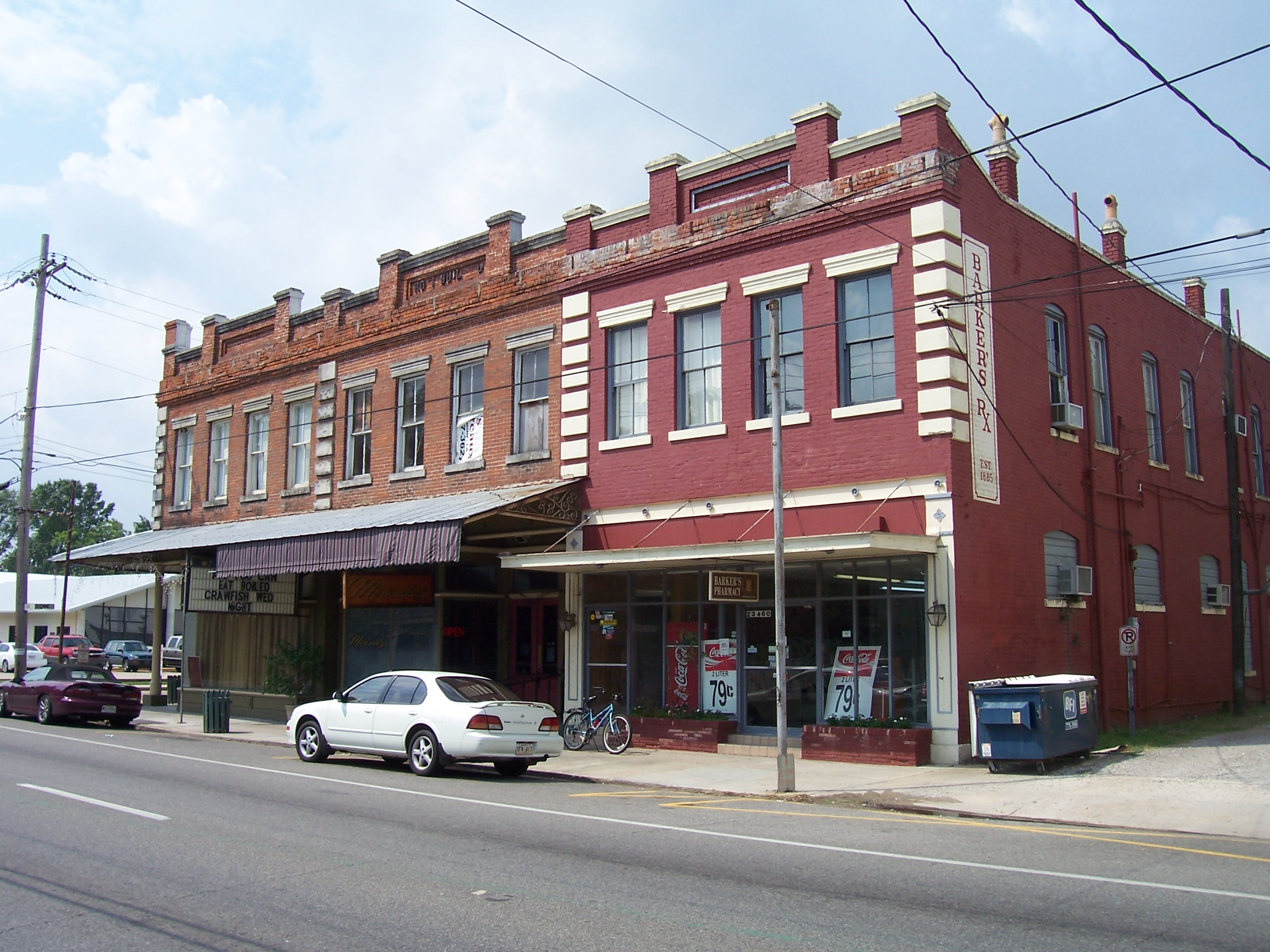
- Three historic buildings at the corner of Eden and Plaquemine Streets

- Location within Louisiana Location within the United States

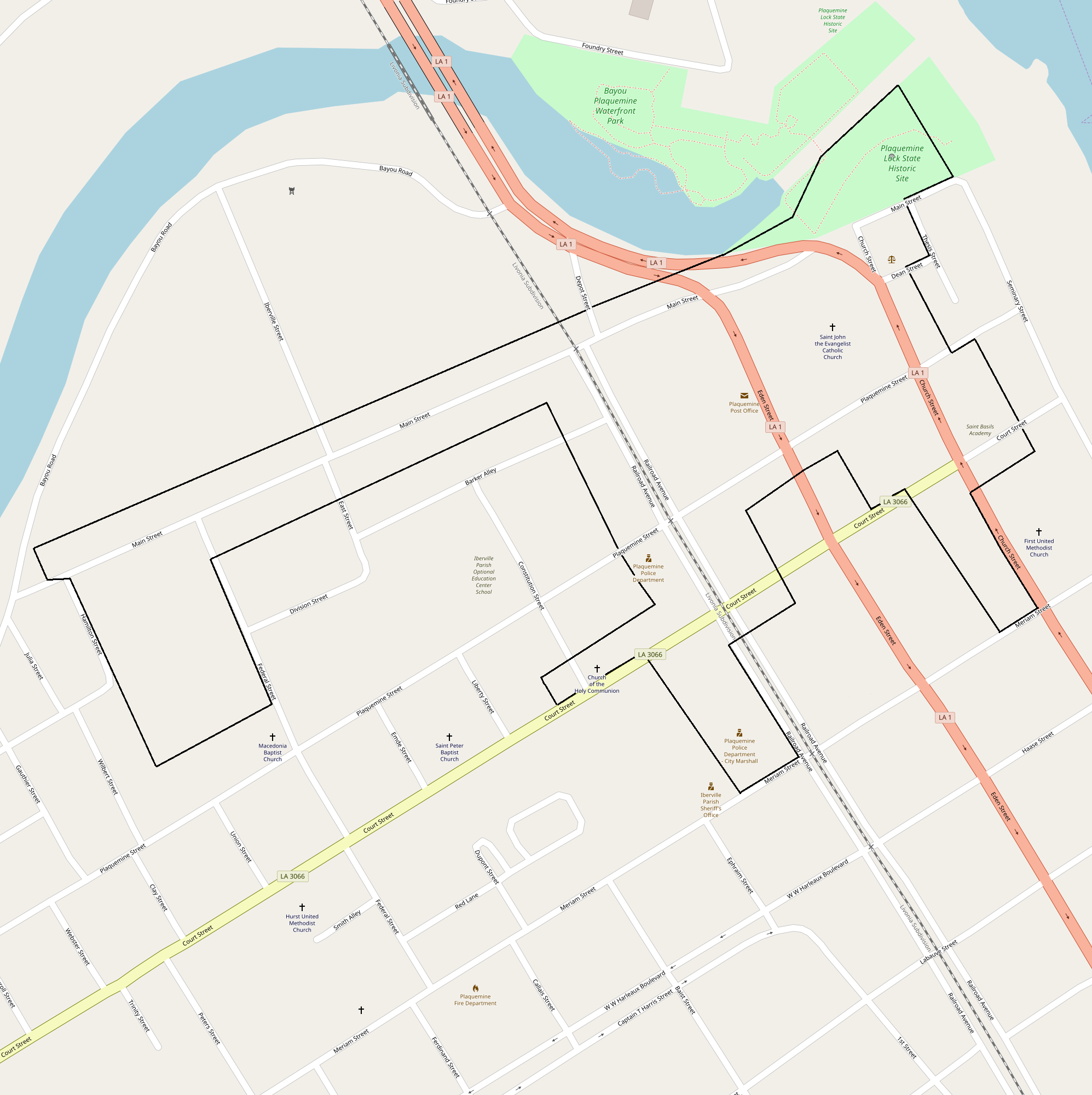
- Location: Railroad Avenue, Main Street, Eden Street, Church Street, Plaquemine Street and Court Street, Plaquemine, Louisiana
- Coordinates: 30°17′24″N 91°14′11″W
- Area: 55 acres (22 ha)
- NRHP reference No.: 89001791 (original); 05000507 (increase)

Significant dates
- Added to NRHP: October 30, 1989
- Boundary increase: June 3, 2005

Plaquemine Historic District is a historic district in downtown Plaquemine, Louisiana, United States, located along Railroad Avenue, Main Street, Eden Street, Church Street, Plaquemine Street and Court Street.

The 55-acre (22 ha) area comprises a total of 133 buildings and structures, of which 95 are considered contributing properties, and 3 are also listed on the National Register of Historic Places as individual properties. Building dates vary from c.1840 to c.1938 and are mostly historic brick commercial buildings and residences of either brick or frame construction.

The historic district was listed on the National Register of Historic Places on October 30, 1989.

Boundaries were increased on June 3, 2005, with the addition of the house at 57725 Court Street, the nearby Carriage House/Stable and Blacksmith Shop.

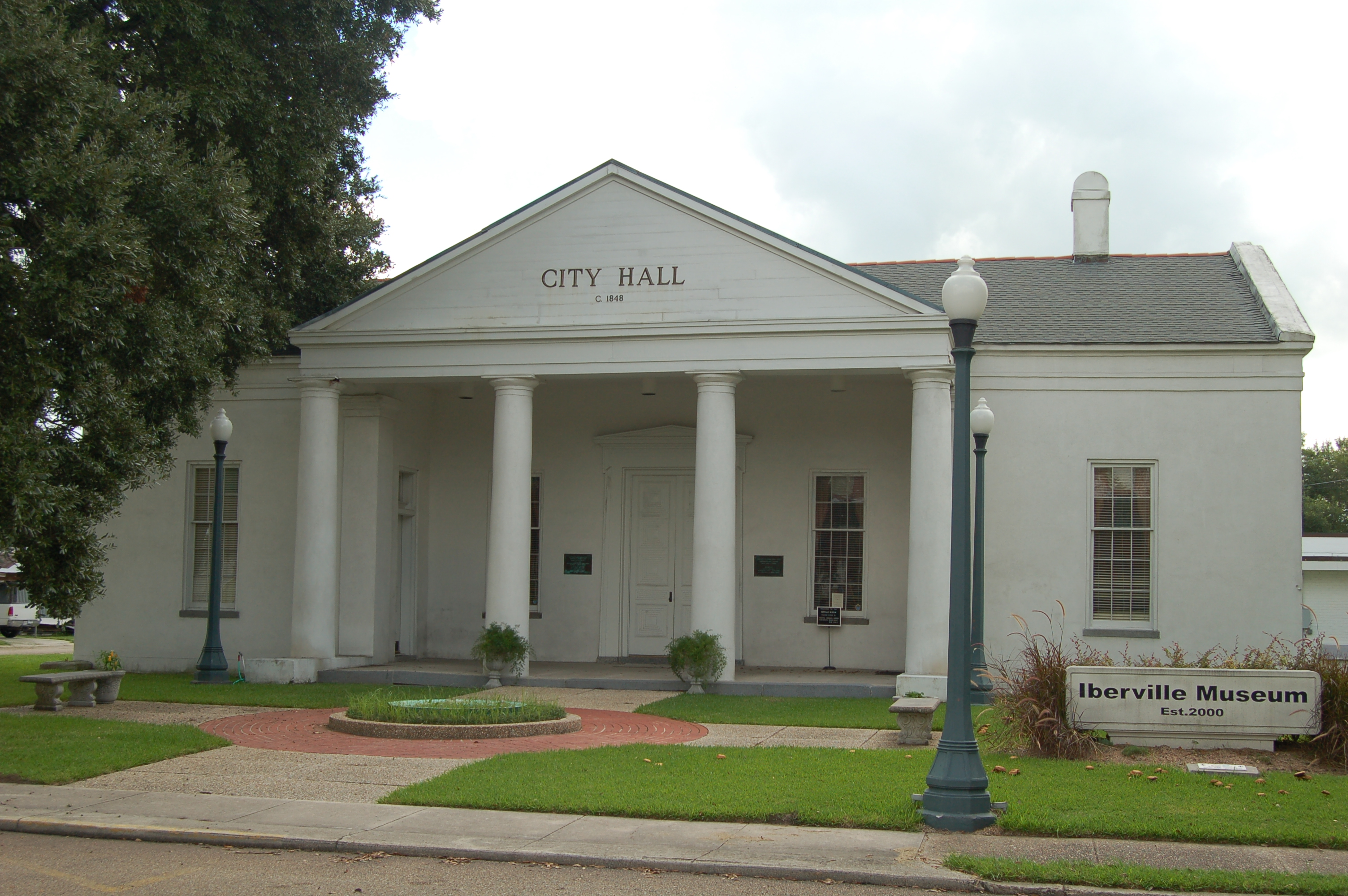
Iberville Parish Courthouse at 57735 Main Street

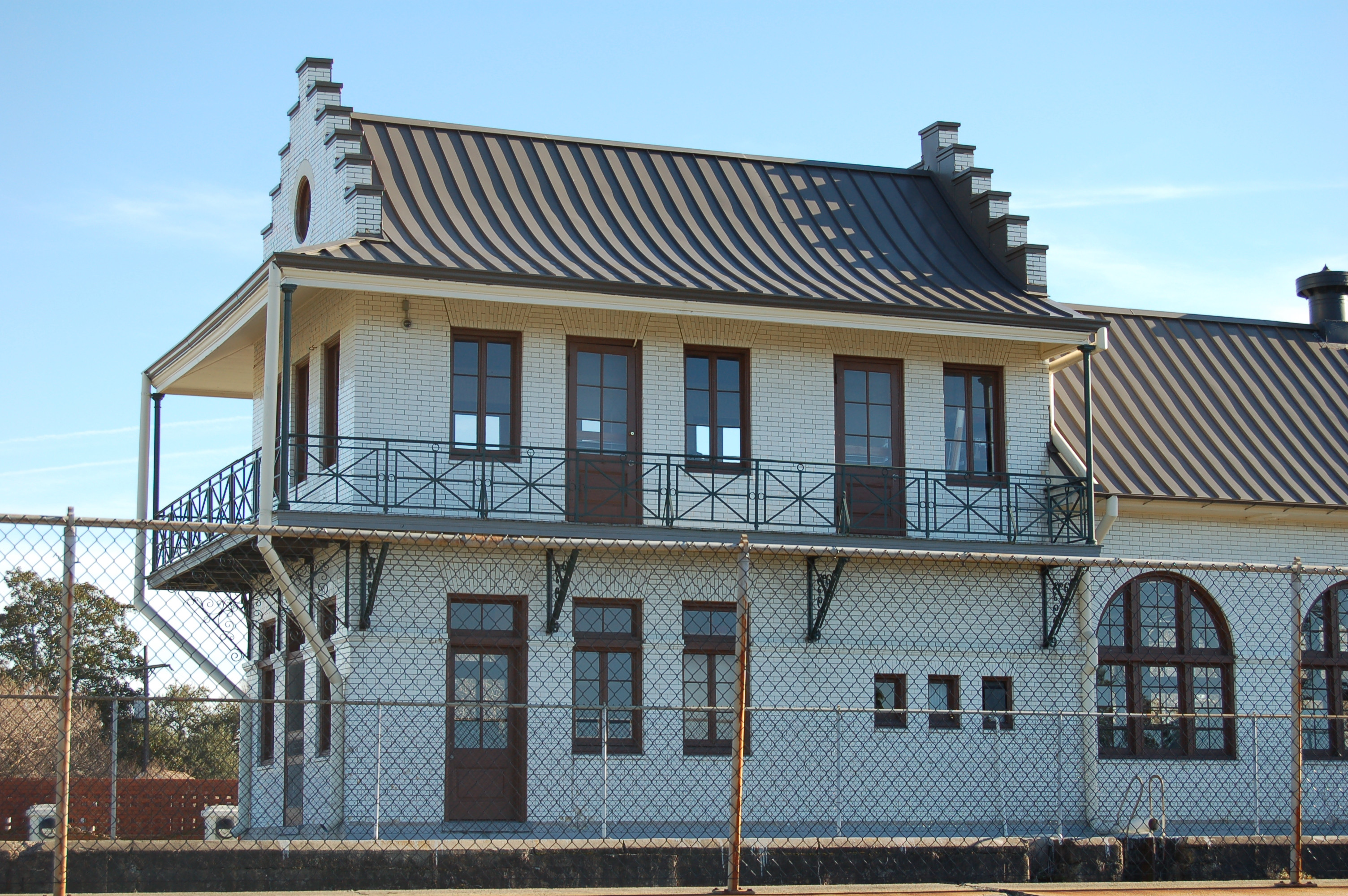
Plaquemine Lock building

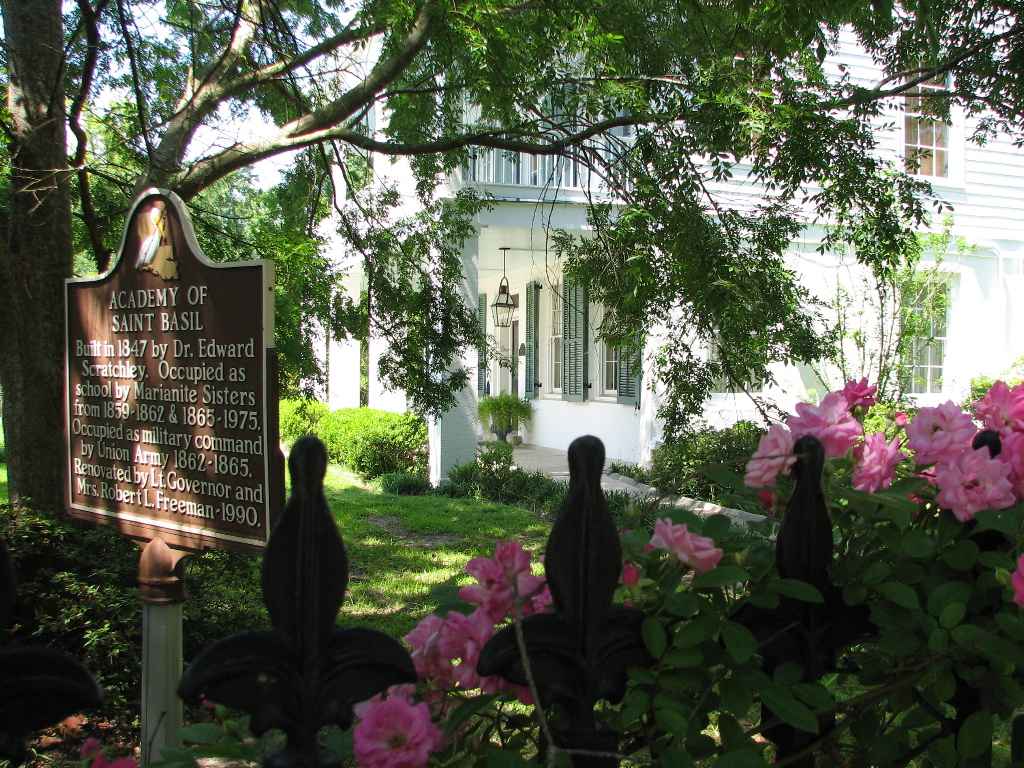
St. Basil's Academy at 23515 Church Street

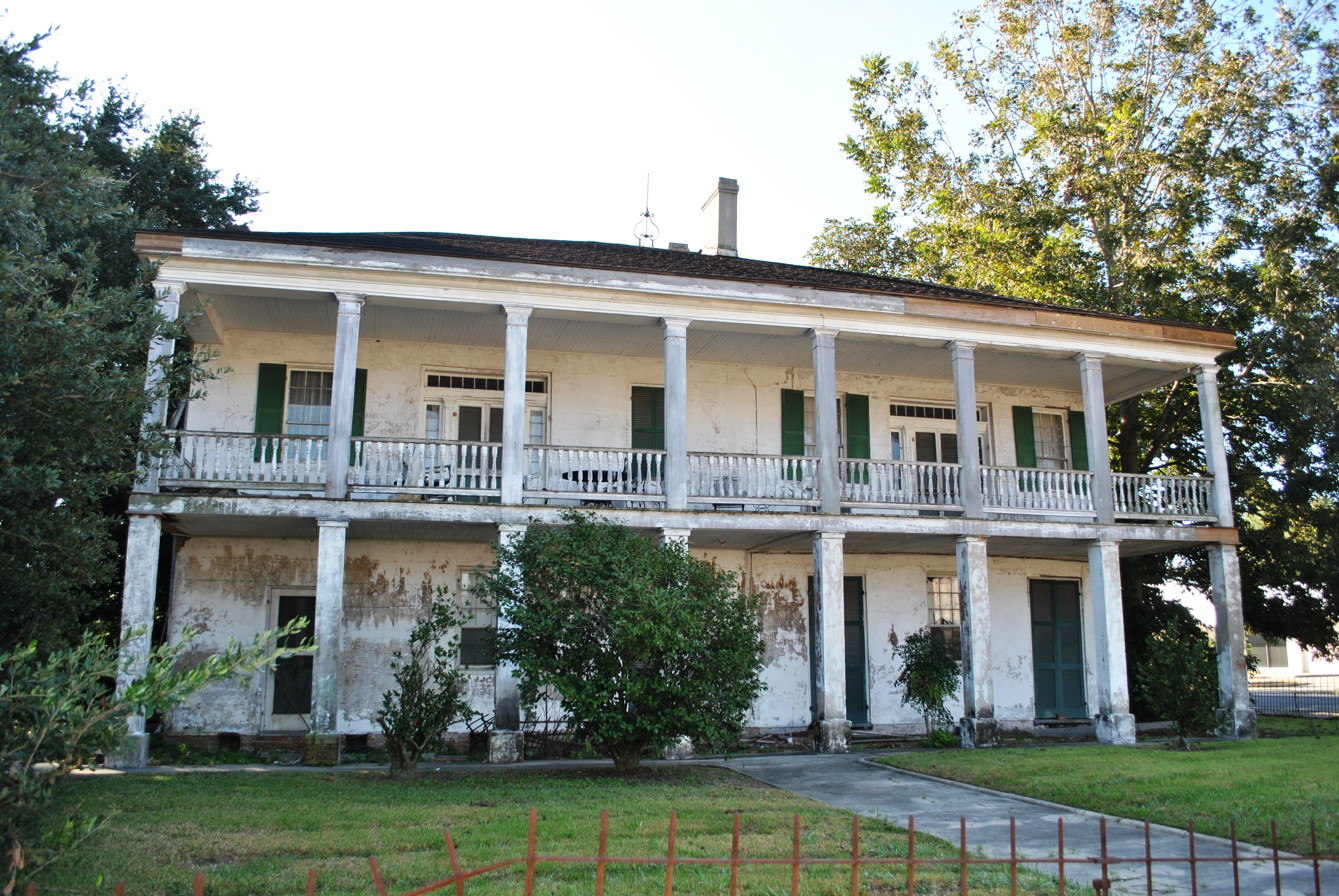
Historic house at 57845 Plaquemine Street

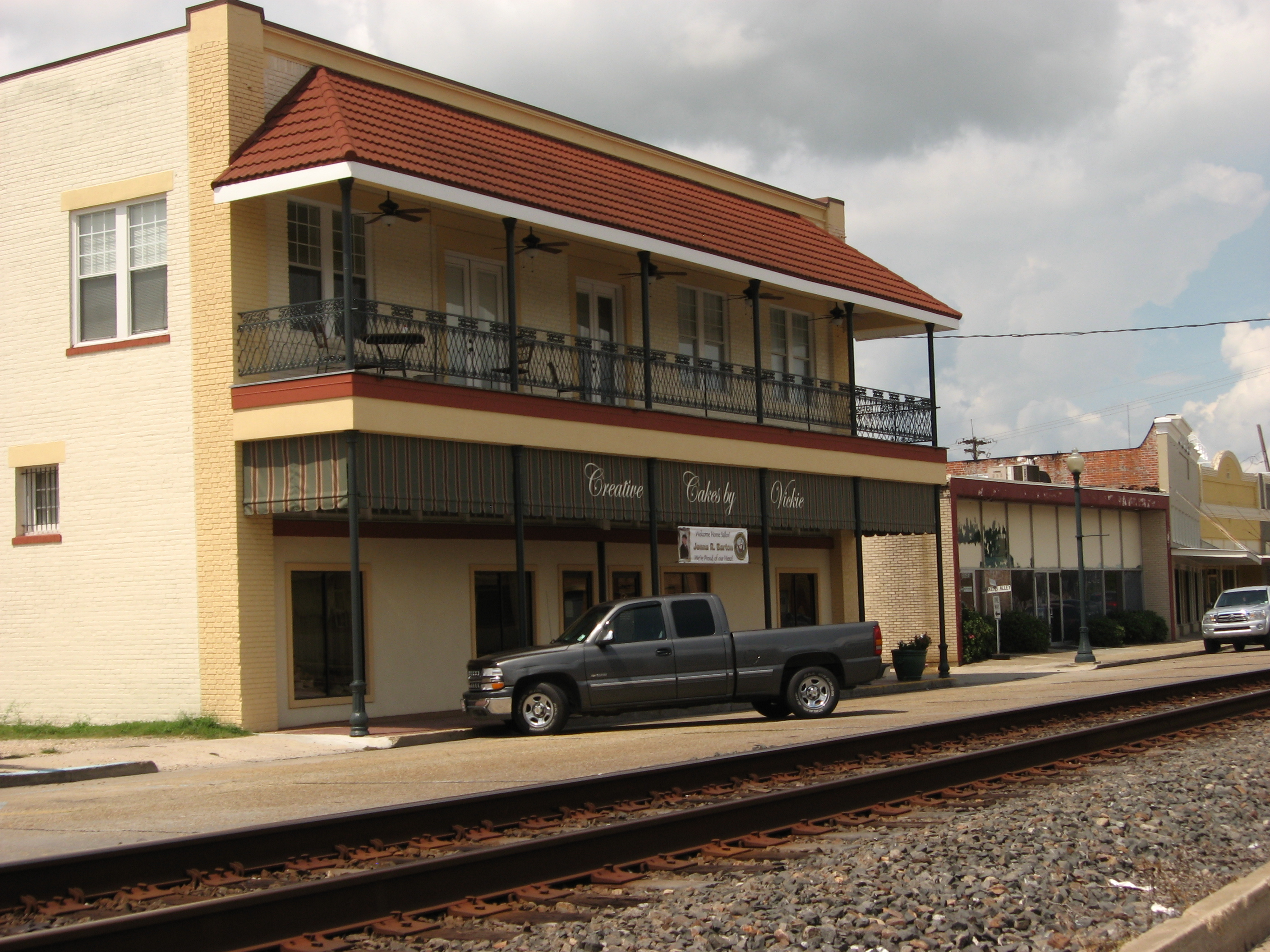
Hirsch Building at 23440 Railroad Avenue

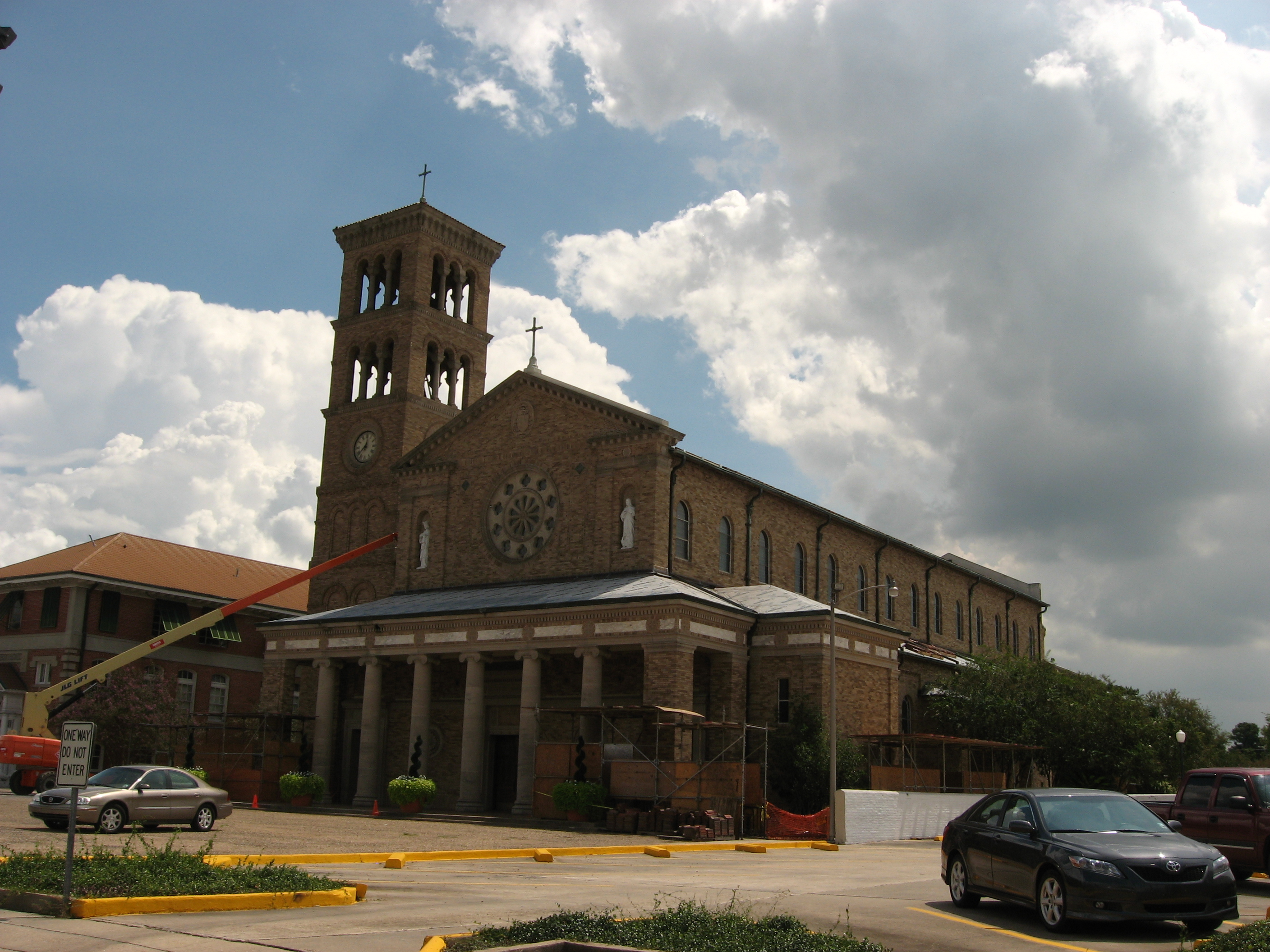
Saint John the Evangelist Catholic Church at 57805 Main Street

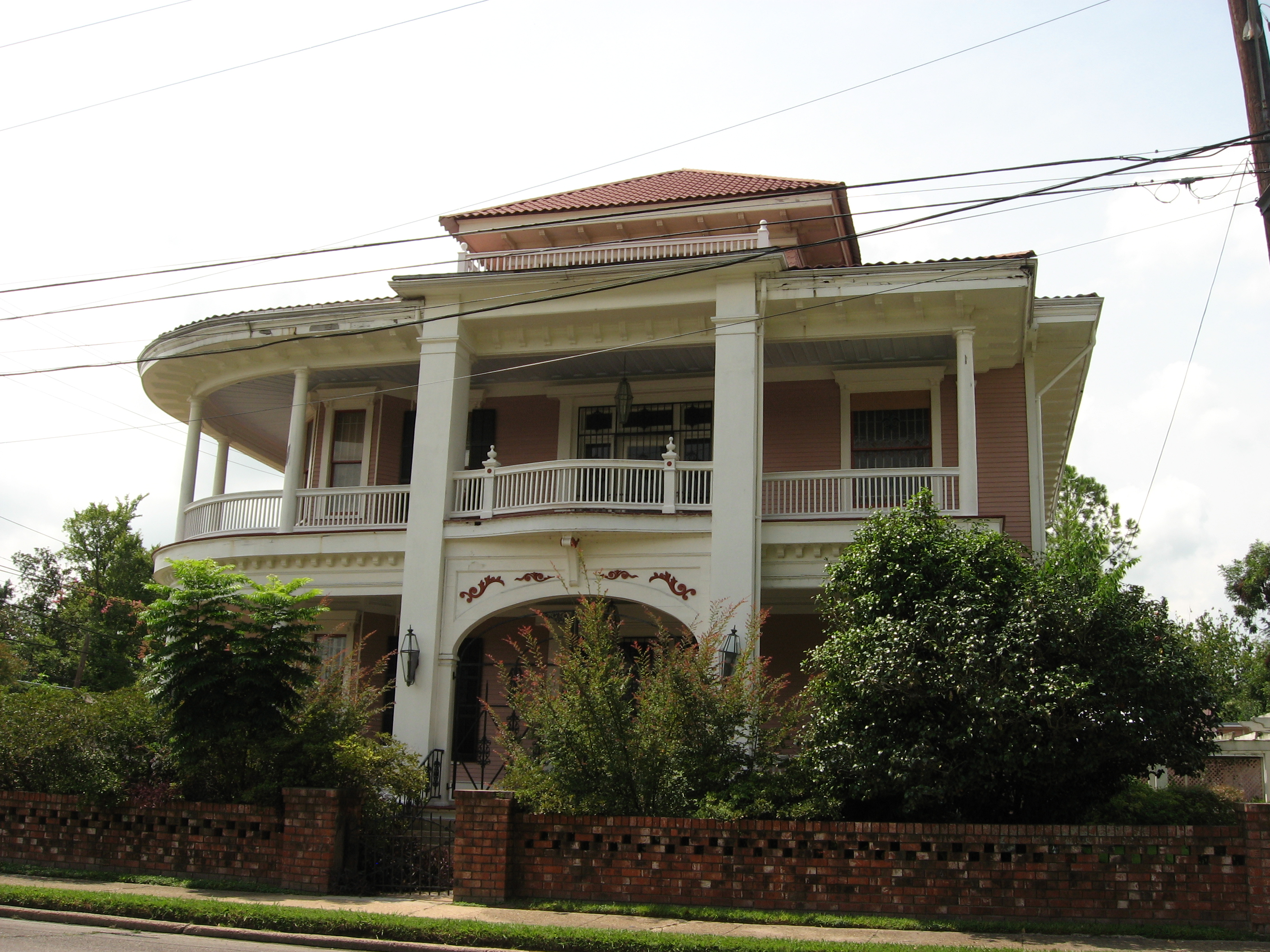
Historic house at 23670 Church Street

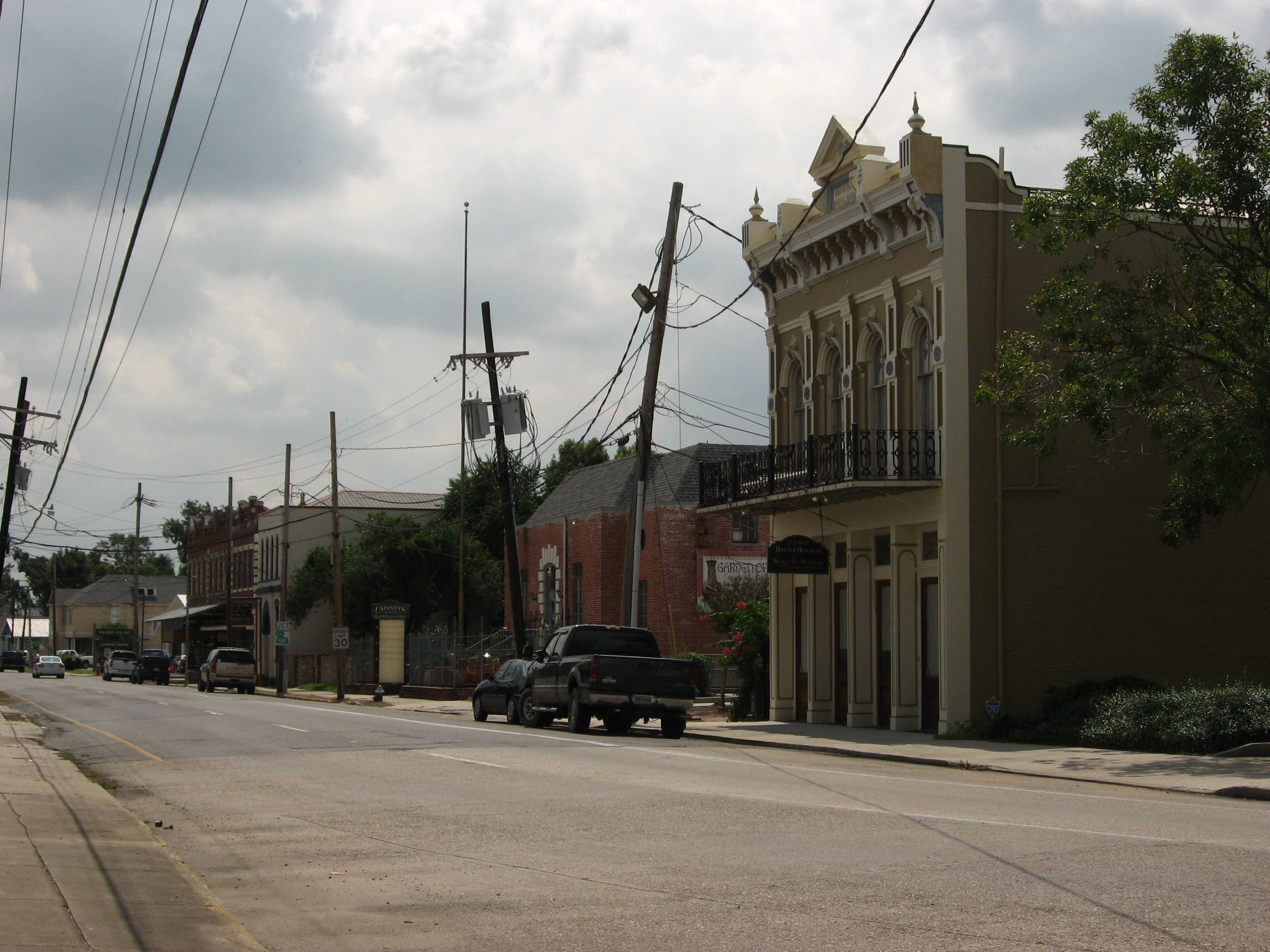
Eden Street view with Brusle Building in the foreground

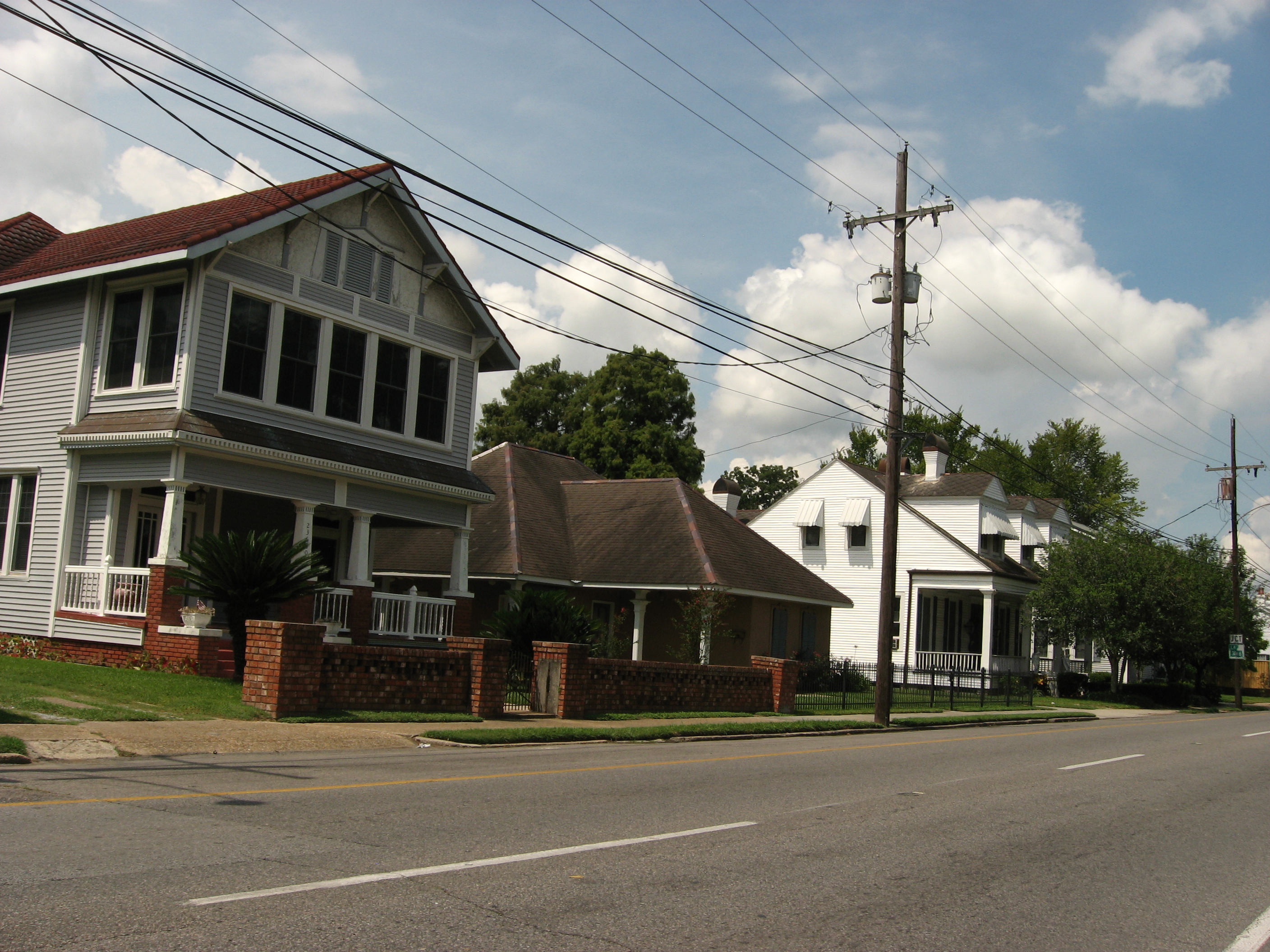
Church Street view with historic house at 23660 in the foreground and historic house at 23640 in the background

== Contributing properties ==
The historical district contains a total of 93 contributing properties, built between c.1840 and c.1938:

=== Main Street buildings ===
- House at 58278 Main Street, 30°17′21″N 91°14′31″W, built c.1920.
- House at 58270 Main Street, 30°17′21″N 91°14′30″W, built c.1920.
- House at 58264 Main Street, 30°17′21″N 91°14′30″W, built c.1910.
- House at 58256 Main Street, 30°17′21″N 91°14′30″W, built c.1910.
- House at 58248 Main Street, 30°17′21″N 91°14′29″W, built c.1910.
- Saint John's Cemetery, 30°17′19″N 91°14′28″W, built c.1850.
- House at 58224 Main Street, 30°17′22″N 91°14′28″W, built c.1885.
- House at 58218 Main Street, 30°17′22″N 91°14′28″W, built c.1885.
- House at 58200 Main Street, 30°17′23″N 91°14′26″W, built c.1880.
- House at 58166 Main Street, 30°17′23″N 91°14′26″W, built c.1920.
- House at 58167 Main Street, 30°17′22″N 91°14′25″W, built c.1880.
- House at 58152 Main Street, 30°17′23″N 91°14′25″W, built c.1925.
- House at 58159 Main Street, 30°17′22″N 91°14′25″W, built c.1840.
- House at 58151 Main Street, 30°17′22″N 91°14′24″W, built c.1900.
- House at 58127 Main Street, 30°17′23″N 91°14′23″W, built c.1880.
- House at 58119 Main Street, 30°17′23″N 91°14′22″W, built c.1900.
- House at 58120 Main Street, 30°17′24″N 91°14′23″W, built c.1930.
- House at 58111 Main Street, 30°17′23″N 91°14′22″W, built c.1880.
- House at 58095 Main Street, 30°17′23″N 91°14′21″W, built c.1900.
- House at 58089 Main Street, 30°17′24″N 91°14′20″W, built c.1880.
- House at 58080 Main Street, 30°17′25″N 91°14′20″W, built c.1905.
- House at 58083 Main Street, 30°17′24″N 91°14′20″W, built c.1890.
- House at 58070 Main Street, 30°17′26″N 91°14′19″W, built c.1900.
- House at 58077 Main Street, 30°17′24″N 91°14′19″W, built c.1885.
- Repair Shop at 58071 Main Street, 30°17′24″N 91°14′19″W, built c.1926.
- Commercial Building at 58065 Main Street, 30°17′25″N 91°14′18″W, built c.1920.
- Commercial Building at 58053 Main Street, 30°17′25″N 91°14′17″W, built c.1900.
- House at 58047 Main Street, 30°17′25″N 91°14′16″W, built c.1925.
- House at 58040 Main Street, 30°17′27″N 91°14′16″W, built c.1890.
- House at 58041 Main Street, 30°17′25″N 91°14′16″W, built c.1925.
- House at 58030 Main Street, 30°17′27″N 91°14′16″W, built c.1900.
- House at 58035 Main Street, 30°17′25″N 91°14′15″W, built c.1925.
- House at 58029 Main Street, 30°17′25″N 91°14′15″W, built c.1925.
- House at 58023 Main Street, 30°17′26″N 91°14′15″W, built c.1925.
- Commercial Building at 58010 Main Street, 30°17′27″N 91°14′15″W, built c.1930.
- Commercial Building at 23400 Railroad Avenue, 30°17′26″N 91°14′14″W, built c.1926.
- Railroad Depot, 57960 Main Street, 30°17′28″N 91°14′13″W, built c.1920.
- Commercial Building at 57945 Main Street, 30°17′27″N 91°14′12″W, built c.1925.
- Commercial Building at 57935 Main Street, 30°17′27″N 91°14′11″W, built c.1900.
- Commercial Building at 57915 Main Street, 30°17′27″N 91°14′11″W, built c.1925.
- Commercial Building at 57905 Main Street, 30°17′28″N 91°14′10″W, built c.1920.
- Saint John the Evangelist Catholic Church, 57805 Main Street, 30°17′28″N 91°14′04″W, built 1926.
- Saint John School, Main Street, 30°17′29″N 91°14′03″W, built c.1915.
- Iberville Parish Courthouse, 57735 Main Street, 30°17′30″N 91°14′02″W, built c.1848. Also individually listed.
- Plaquemine Lock Building, 57730 Main Street, 30°17′33″N 91°14′04″W, built 1909. Also part of Bayou Plaquemine Lock enlistment since May 19, 1972.

=== Church Street buildings ===
- House at 23415 Church Street, 30°17′29″N 91°14′02″W, built c.1925.
- House at 23425 Church Street, 30°17′29″N 91°14′02″W, built c.1920.
- St. Basil's Academy, 23515 Church Street, 30°17′25″N 91°14′00″W, built c.1850. Also individually listed.
- House at 23510 Church Street, 30°17′25″N 91°14′02″W, built c.1920.
- House at 23520 Church Street, 30°17′24″N 91°14′01″W, built c.1875.
- House at 23610 Church Street, 30°17′23″N 91°14′01″W, built c.1910. No more standing.
- House at 23620 Church Street, 30°17′22″N 91°14′00″W, built c.1885.
- House at 23630 Church Street, 30°17′22″N 91°14′00″W, built c.1925.
- House at 23640 Church Street, 30°17′21″N 91°13′59″W, built c.1905.
- House at 23660 Church Street, 30°17′20″N 91°13′59″W, built c.1915.
- House at 23670 Church Street, 30°17′20″N 91°13′58″W, built c.1905.

=== Plaquemine Street buildings ===
- House at 57748 Plaquemine Street, 30°17′27″N 91°14′01″W, built c.1920.
- House at 57742 Plaquemine Street, 30°17′27″N 91°14′01″W, built c.1890.
- House at 57713 Plaquemine Street, 30°17′27″N 91°13′59″W, built c.1880.
- Rectory at 57810 Plaquemine Street, 30°17′27″N 91°14′03″W, built c.1880.
- Old Gas Station, 57805 Plaquemine Street, 30°17′26″N 91°14′02″W, built c.1925.
- House at 57845 Plaquemine Street, 30°17′24″N 91°14′05″W, built c.1850.
- Commercial Building at 57945 Plaquemine Street, 30°17′22″N 91°14′08″W, built c.1930.
- Commercial Building at 57953 Plaquemine Street, 30°17′22″N 91°14′09″W, built c.1930.
- Commercial Building at 57955 Plaquemine Street, 30°17′22″N 91°14′09″W, built c.1895.

=== Court Street buildings ===
- House at 57725 Court Street, 30°17′24″N 91°13′58″W, built c.1895.
- Carriage House/Stable, 30°17′23″N 91°13′57″W, built between 1900 and 1906.
- Blacksmith Shop, 30°17′24″N 91°13′57″W, built 1896.
- House at 57820 Court Street, 30°17′23″N 91°14′02″W, built c.1900.
- House at 57830 Court Street, 30°17′22″N 91°14′03″W, built c.1910. No more standing.
- House at 57920 Court Street, 30°17′21″N 91°14′07″W, built c.1905.
- House at 57925 Court Street, 30°17′19″N 91°14′07″W, built c.1895.
- House at 58060 Court Street, 30°17′17″N 91°14′14″W, built c.1870.
- Episcopal Church of the Holy Communion, 58040 Court Street, 30°17′18″N 91°14′13″W, built c.1900.
- Episcopal Church Rectory, 58036 Court Street, 30°17′18″N 91°14′12″W, built c.1875.
- House at 58030 Court Street, 30°17′19″N 91°14′11″W, built c.1925.
- Commercial Building at 58020 Court Street, 30°17′19″N 91°14′11″W, built c.1935.
- House at 58010 Court Street, 30°17′19″N 91°14′10″W, built c.1850. No more standing.

=== Eden Street buildings ===
- Commercial Building #1 on Eden Street, 30°17′25″N 91°14′06″W, built c.1920. No more standing.
- Commercial Building at 23466 Eden Street, 30°17′24″N 91°14′07″W, built c.1890.
- Commercial Building at 23464 Eden Street, 30°17′24″N 91°14′07″W, built c.1890.
- Commercial Building at 23460 Eden Street, 30°17′25″N 91°14′07″W, built c.1890.
- Cottage #1 on Eden Street, 30°17′26″N 91°14′06″W, built c.1890. No more standing.
- Commercial Building at 23450 Eden Street, 30°17′25″N 91°14′07″W, built c.1890.
- Cottage at 23440 Eden Street, 30°17′25″N 91°14′08″W, built c.1885. No more standing.
- School District Building, 23430 Eden Street, 30°17′26″N 91°14′08″W, built c.1935.
- Commercial Building at 23420 Eden Street, 30°17′27″N 91°14′08″W, built c.1938.
- Brusle Building, 23410 Eden Street, 30°17′27″N 91°14′08″W, built c.1889.

=== Railroad Avenue buildings ===
- Commercial Building at 23425 Railroad Avenue, 30°17′26″N 91°14′11″W, built c.1930.
- Plaquemine City Hall, 23640 Railroad Avenue, 30°17′16″N 91°14′07″W, built 1906.
- Commercial Building at 23540 Railroad Avenue, 30°17′20″N 91°14′09″W, built c.1895. Actually hosting the Plaquemine Police Department.
- Commercial Building #2 on Railroad Avenue, 30°17′20″N 91°14′10″W, built c.1920. No more standing.
- Hirsch Building, 23440 Railroad Avenue, 30°17′24″N 91°14′12″W, built c.1925.
- Commercial Building at 23420 Railroad Avenue, 30°17′26″N 91°14′13″W, built c.1895.
- Commercial Building at 23412 Railroad Avenue, 30°17′26″N 91°14′13″W, built c.1905.

== See also ==
- National Register of Historic Places listings in Iberville Parish, Louisiana
- Iberville Parish Courthouse
- Bayou Plaquemine Lock
- St. Basil's Academy
