= Tally-Ho Plantation House =

Historic house in Louisiana, United States

- U.S. National Register of Historic Places
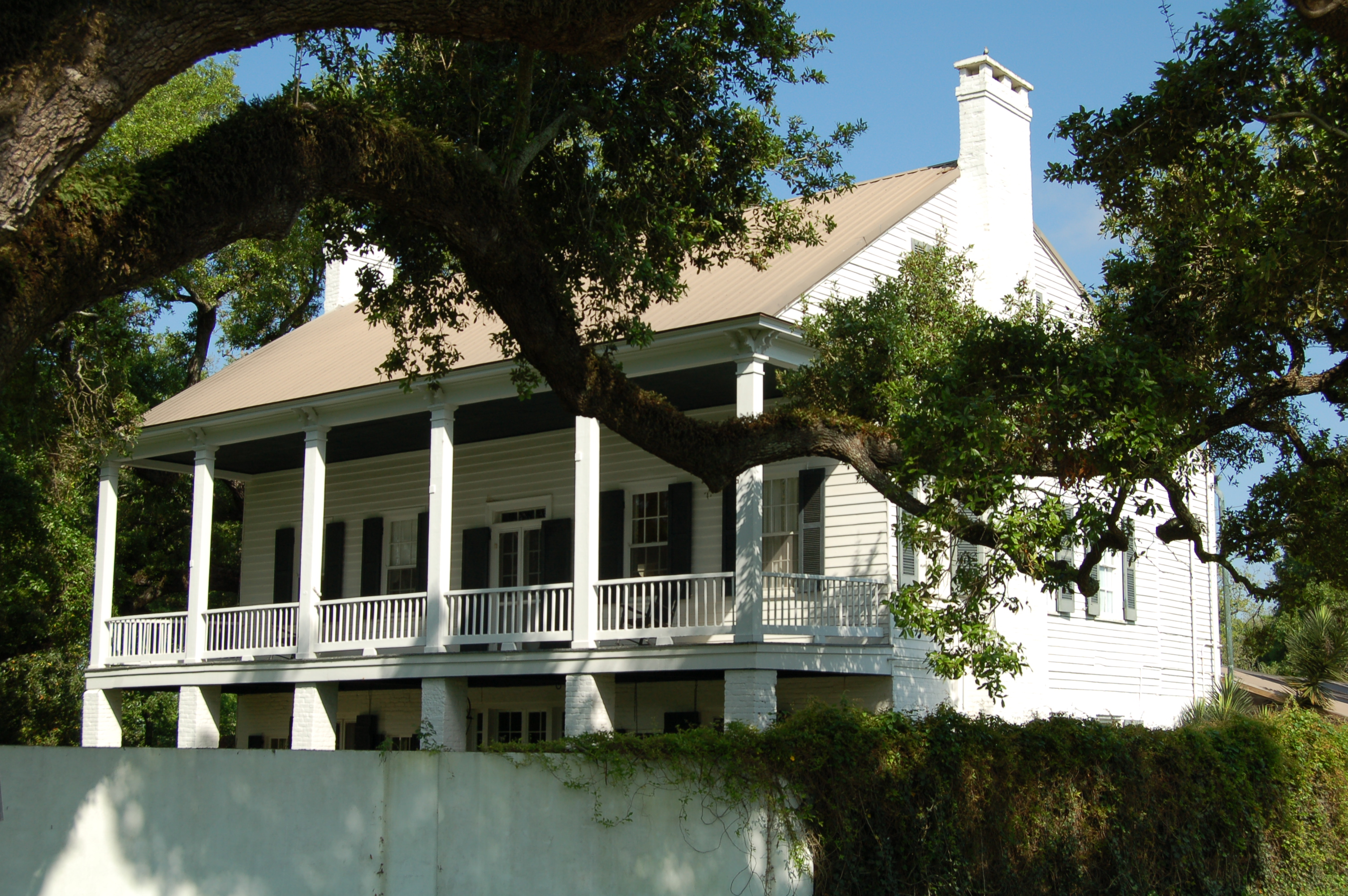

- Location within Louisiana Location within the United States
- Location: Along River Road (LA 405), Bayou Goula, Louisiana
- Coordinates: 30°12′11″N 91°10′14″W
- Area: 0.5 acres (0.20 ha)
- Built: c.1840
- Architectural style: Greek Revival
- NRHP reference No.: 80001731
- Added to NRHP: January 20, 1980

Tally-Ho Plantation House, is a historic mansion located along River Road in Bayou Goula, Louisiana.

Iberville Parish records show that Tally-Ho site was owned by Jean Fleming, a free man of color, sometime before 1835. There were several more owners after Fleming. John Dobbins Murrell, a slaveholder from Virginia bought the sugar plantation in 1848, and it has remained in the family ever since. The home is said to have been moved back from the Mississippi River twice and the main house burned in 1945. The name Tally Ho is said to reflect Murrell's fox-hunting background. The current house is what was used as the overseer's home. It is a raised Acadian cottage with Greek Revival influences.

The plantation's river dock was the site of showboat performances. The New Sensations, the first of the Mississippi River troubadours, stopped there in 1878 to perform a vaudeville-type show. The barn, office and a slave cabin remain down a side road.

The house was listed on the National Register of Historic Places on January 20, 1980.

== See also ==
- List of plantations in Louisiana
- National Register of Historic Places listings in Iberville Parish, Louisiana
