= Acadia Plantation =

Historic house in Louisiana, United States

- U.S. National Register of Historic Places
- U.S. Historic district
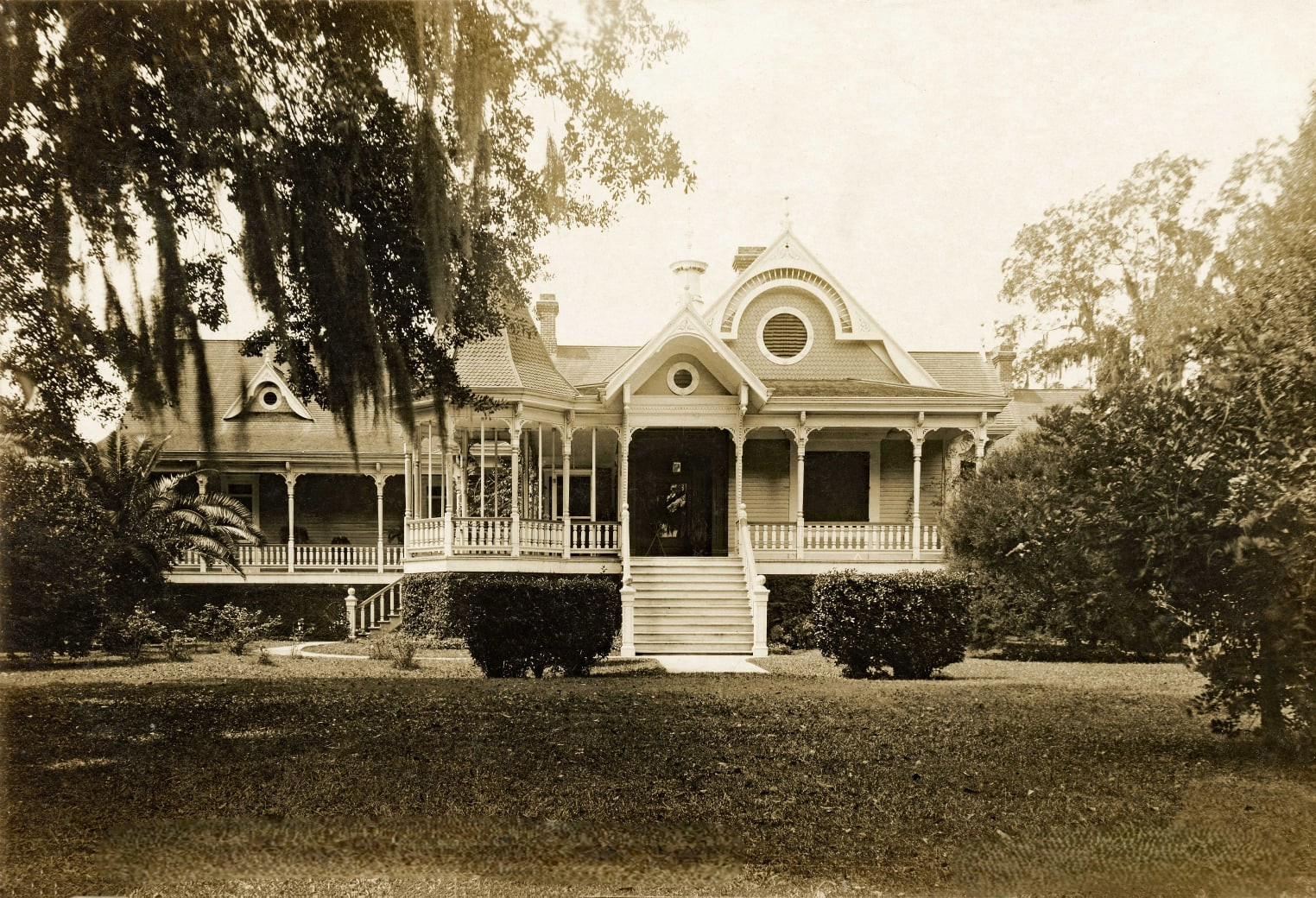

- Location within Louisiana
- Location: 110 Rue Angelique
- Nearest city: Thibodaux, Louisiana
- Coordinates: 29°46′27″N 90°48′0″W
- Area: 28 acres (11 ha)
- Built: 1890
- Architectural style: Stick/eastlake, Queen Anne Revival
- NRHP reference No.: 87000849
- Added to NRHP: May 29, 1987

The Acadia Plantation was a historic plantation house in Thibodaux, Louisiana, U.S.. It was the plantation of James Bowie, Rezin P. Bowie, and Stephen Bowie. James "Jim" Bowie, served in the Battle of the Alamo. It was listed on the National Register of Historic Places on May 29, 1987. It was demolished in 2010.

== Today ==
In 2010 Acadia Plantation was demolished and a plaque was placed on Hwy 1 next to Nicholls State University in memory of the plantation. Construction crews worked from the inside out as they dismantled portions of the historic plantation home. The land and home was purchased by Jake Giardina and partner Ron Adams in 2003 from the Plater family as part of a 3,000-acre transaction. The home's future had been a topic of local debate since that time, although there have been no organized attempts to save it. It was listed on the National Register of Historic Places. The 3,400-acre plot of land is now a subdivision which includes a mix of stores, restaurants and homes to the people of Thibodaux. The 132-acres of Acadia Plantation is now developed into residential homes and businesses. The style and arrangement is similar to those found in the New Orleans French Quarter. A grammar school, children museum, doctors office are among the developments of the subdivision.

== History ==
Acadia Plantation, with its gables, dormer windows, and ornate gallery, was located south of Bayou Lafourche, along the crest of the natural levee. Highway 1 now approximately 50 meters to the north, and Nicholls State University is approximately 500 meters to the west-northwest. The home was owned by Mr. and Mrs. Richard C. Plater Jr. The house was torn down in 2010.

The long history of this plantation was a colorful tale of Louisiana's past. Acadia plantation was first owned by the Bowie brothers, Jim Bowie, Rezin Bowie, and Stephen Bowie who had a lucrative business that involved buying slaves from Jean Lafitte in Galveston, Spanish Texas, and bringing them overland to Opelousas to be sold. Indian trouble made this a dangerous route, however, so in 1819 operations were moved to Bayou Black and Bayou Grand Caillou in Terrebonne Parish, Louisiana. In 1825 a spring Mississippi River flood drove the brothers from the parish leaving them in need of new headquarters.

In 1828 the brothers began buying several adjoining plantations naming the land Acadia. Separate homes were built only yards apart for Jim, Rezin, and the brothers' mother. On this land the Bowies built Louisiana's first steam-powered sugar mill, although it was unsuccessful and destroyed more cane than it crushed. In 1830 the brothers purchased the back land totaling the size of the plantation to about twenty-one hundred acres. Jim's restlessness soon had him joining the adventure of "GTT" gone to Texas, where he later became one of the many heroes of the Battle of the Alamo. Stephen Bowie served as Sheriff of Lafourche Parish for a short period, but abandoned the job and Acadia property, returning to Natchez shortly before he died in 1833. Rezin P., struggling with diminishing eyesight, moved to New Orleans with family, where he died in 1841. Brother John Jones, although he married America Watkins, of Terrebonne Parish, at the home in 1831, did not establish their home on the grounds. They first moved to Arkansas, and then to near Natchez. John Jones Bowie, died in 1860, and was buried at Bowie Plantation in Arkansas and America Watkins Bowie, died in 1891, was buried in Natchez, MS.

In 1831 Acadia Plantation was sold to Duncan, Robert Walker and James Wilkins. During this time the Union Bank of Louisiana opened a branch in Thibodaux and invited landowners to mortgage their land to buy shares in the bank. The owners of the plantation lost everything to the bank in 1842 because of a depression and two years of crop failure. In 1845 Philip Barton Key Jr. (1804–1855), 1st cousin of Francis Scott Key, bought the land from the bank. This included all the land of Acadia, the growing crops, every slave, and shares in the bank. He added three other sizable tracts of land to the estate before his death in 1855. Philip Barton Key, Jr.'s mother, Ann Plater Key (1772–1834), was the 2nd great aunt of Richard C. Plater Jr., Acadia Plantation's last owner.

The land was then purchased by John Nelson and his son-in-law, Andrew Jackson Donelson, (a nephew of Mrs. Andrew Jackson) until he died in 1858, and the war and postwar years saw several mortgages and lawsuits developed from Nelson's attempts to hold the plantation together. When Acadia was seized in lieu of taxes for 1871 and '72, Edward J. Gay, paid the debt, and operations of the plantation were resumed by Gay and Nelson. When Edward J. Gay died the Prices formed one spacious home by joining the three original homes of Jim, Rezin, and Mrs. Bowie. The Prices also ran the sugar mill on the land from 1850 until 1926, and continued to farm cane. In the late 1900s a dairy farm was set behind the main home and operated until the 1940s.

== Architecture ==
The main house at Acadia Plantation was locally significant in the area of architecture as a landmark among late nineteenth–early twentieth century residences in Lafourche Parish. The present standing structures at Acadia include a c.1890 frame Queen Anne Revival main house, two contemporaneous cottages, and relatively modern outbuildings. The house had a rambling cruciform plan with ten major rooms on a principal story. Two flights of steps which ascended a full story to an Eastlake gallery. This gallery made a total of four ninety-degree turns as it runs from one side of the house to the other. The main entrance of the house was marked by an oeil-de-boeuf gable supported by two enormous brackets. Each of the Eastlake gallery columns was surmounted by a rounder bracket ornamented with pateras. The complex roof-line consisted of central pyramid with gabled wings coming off all four sides. Each of the principal gables is ornamented with imbricated shingles. At one time they also featured a large oculus and decorative verge boards, but they were removed in the 1930s. Exterior features included the oculus windows at the basement level, the window and door cornices, and shutters, most of which were original to the 1890 period. Also at about that time part of the hall had been enlarged to form a living room and small rear and side extensions were built.

== Interior layout ==
The layout of inside the plantation was a preliminary archaeological reconnaissance and assessment provided by Richard C. Beavers in August 1983.

The library was the part of the house that was originally a shotgun house with a side hall. It was joined by two other small houses to form the one structure that was the shape of an off-centered cross. The style of the library was a Victorian style. The living room had a Victorian settee, with paneled walls, hard pine floors, and deep molded baseboards. Inside the room was a paneled chimney and mantle. The small guest bedroom was turned into a connection bathroom serving the two guest bedrooms on the west wing of the house. Mr. Plater's office was once a porch and was later enclosed as an office, from the window you can see the bell stand upon which are mounted three bells that are important to the history of the Acadia Plantation.

The dining room is a formal dining room built as a connecting wing between the front part of the house and small two-room house owned by Mrs. Bowie. The fireplace has a paneled chimney breast, with slender ionic columns. The kitchen and breakfast room was at one time a pantry and later converted to an informal dining room. This room holds a New England style appearance. The kitchen had been remodeled over the years. Servant's peep hole was provided on the dining room door to prevent accidents and watch for signals when their attention was needed in the dining room. The boys room was another of the single houses joined to form a greater part of the room. The back porch had a view of the cisterns which were the main water supply to the house. The small house to the right was where the cooks lived and other buildings included a carriage shed, stable, hen house, and so on. Further back stood the Acadia Sugar Factory, the boarding house, blacksmith shop, barn, approximately 70 cabins of the Acadia quarters, and finally sugar cane stretched as far as the eye could see. Today, it is no longer. The land has been developed into residential and commercial enterprises, including Thibodaux Regional Hospital.. The old sugar cane industry is no more, but it is and was so much a part of the heritage at Acadia.

== Furniture and collections ==
The furniture and collections inside the plantation were a preliminary archaeological reconnaissance and assessment provided by Richard C. Beavers in August 1983.

In the library was a portrait of Edward George Washington Butler hanging on the wall. He was David Plater's great-great-grandfather from Iberville Parish. Several pieces of furniture found in the library and throughout the house were passed down to the family from relatives. Some of these items included corner chair called a roundabout, a set of Staffordshire dogs on the shelves in the library, two tables that flanked the front windows, a sofa with a spindle-back settee of the 1810 era, and a rocker called a comb-back Windsor constructed of pine.

A bow-front chest and desk, made of Hepplewhite from New England sat in the corner of the living room. On the mantle was an oil painting of Mrs. Thomas Plater, née Mary Louise Bugg, Mr. Plater, and Jr.'s grandmother. Several chairs, spread about the room, dated to the time the Prices occupied the house. Against the wall was a three-tier table constructed of Chippendale, with claw feet. In the guest bedroom is a massive armoire and swan-neck cradle, a canopy bed made maple from the Sheraton style. Near the mantle is a drop-leaf desk made of pine. In the front of the fireplace was a Windsor rocker. On the mantel sat blue vases which were gifts from Mrs. Price from her sister, Mary Susan Gay Butler. The master bedroom in the corner nearby was a highboy chest that belonged to Plater ancestors of the 1700s. Near the bed stood a sewing table which still held wooden spools. On the chimney, and front wall hung Dawson Watson paintings.

In Mr. Plater's office there were several cane-seat captain's chairs from the plantation furniture. A map desk which was equipped with a lighted display surface that enhanced the details on maps. Over the window was a prize possession of a replica of the Bowie knife. In the dining room on the west wall near the door hangs a portrait of Edward J. Gay. To the right of the fireplace hangs a portrait of his wife, Lavinia Hynes Gay. On the back wall is Nellie Curtis Lewis, granddaughter of Martha Washington. Above the fireplace is a painting of Lord Byron. The furniture in this room was the finest antiques in the house. Against the wall was a Maryland sideboard, Sheraton in style. A corner cabinet nearby was made of mahogany and pine. It was 18th century Chippendale and came from the estate of Lord Thomas Fairfax of Virginia. The dining table was designed from two card tables and was Victorian mahogany. The rug on which the dining table and chairs was a turn of the century one.

In the kitchen and breakfast area, most of the furniture originated from New England. Against the back wall was a dresser with knife slots along the front edge of the shelves. On the left was antique clocks, below on the old pastry table and a child's toy wood-burning stove. One the east wall were two Clementine Hunter paintings entitled "The Nativity-Mary with child" and "Washday". On the east wall was a very old table with a drawing by David and Sheela Plater's son, Chris. In the boy's room was a twin four-poster bed that belonged to Mr. and Mrs. Richard Plater's mother. A chest in the corner near the door was from the 1820s. A print over the mantle was of George and Martha Washington entitled "Courtship. The furniture in the guest bedroom was all striped maple, late eighteenth century. The bed was turned wooden post and broken scroll pediment of the headboard. A canopy was attached to the four posts. Near the bed on the right, a small wash stand that was used as a bed-side table. In the corner is a drop-leaf desk on which were two carved boats of Nicaraguan mahogany. Above the desk and hanging from picture frame molding was an old map of the Mississippi River. A painting by the impressionist Jean Baptiste Corot hung above a bookcase. Over the fireplace was another Dawson Watson painting depicting a haystack in a field. The blue vases on the mantle were made in Italy, and Windsor chair sat near the bed.

== See also ==
- List of plantations in Louisiana
- National Register of Historic Places listings in Lafourche Parish, Louisiana
