= Bagatelle Plantation =

Historic house in Louisiana, United States

- Bagatelle Plantation House
- U.S. National Register of Historic Places
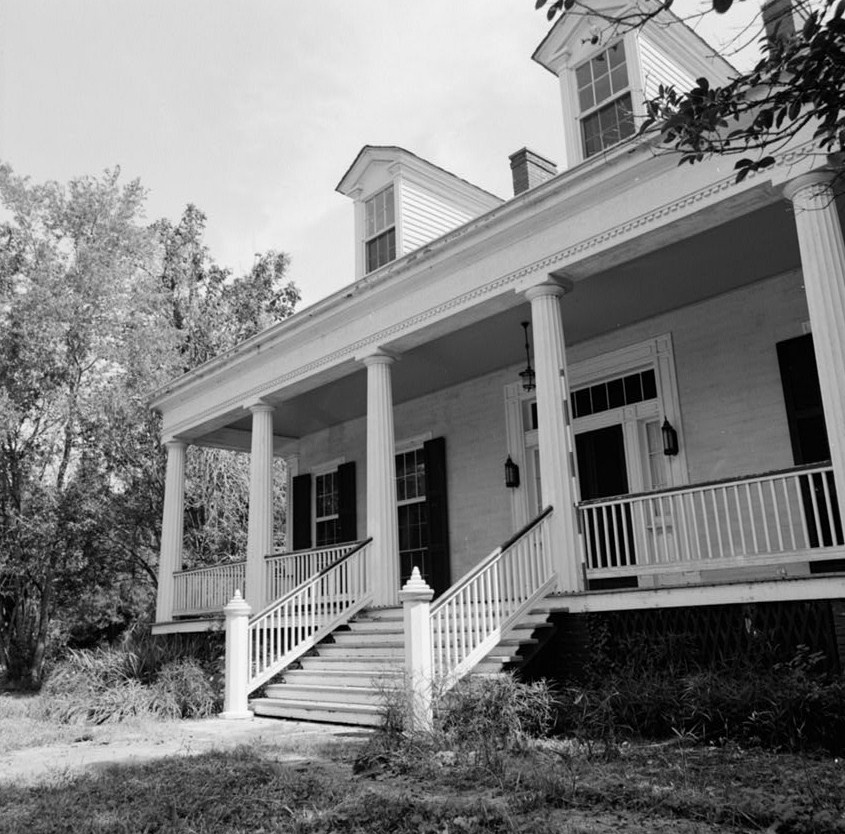

- Location within Louisiana Location within the United States
- Location: 695 River Road (LA 991)
- Nearest city: Sunshine, Louisiana, U.S.
- Coordinates: 30°18′34″N 91°11′08″W
- Area: less than one acre
- Built: 1841
- Architect: Robert S. Chadsey
- Architectural style: Greek Revival
- NRHP reference No.: 07000424
- Added to NRHP: May 9, 2007

The Bagatelle Plantation is a Southern plantation with a historic mansion in Sunshine, Louisiana, USA just outside of St. Gabriel, Louisiana.

The house was designed by architect Robert S. Chadsey in the Greek Revival architectural style in 1841 for the plantation owner, Augustin Marius Tureaud.

The historic house has been moved twice. After the Great Mississippi Flood of 1927 it was moved a further back from the levee, inside the same property in St. James Parish. In 1977 a second move, due to a purchase of the land by Missouri-Portland Cement Company, brought the house to its present location in Iberville Parish. The house was moved in one piece on a barge up Mississippi River course, about 30 miles (48 km) north of its original location.

The house was listed on the National Register of Historic Places on May 9, 2007.

== See also ==
- List of plantations in Louisiana
- National Register of Historic Places listings in Iberville Parish, Louisiana
