= Andrew Price (politician) =

American politician

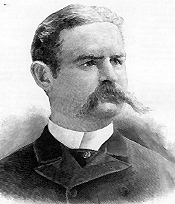

Member of the U.S. House of Representatives from Louisiana's 3rd district
- In office December 2, 1889 – March 3, 1897
- Preceded by: Edward J. Gay
- Succeeded by: Robert F. Broussard

Personal details
- Born: April 2, 1854 near Franklin, Louisiana
- Died: February 5, 1909 (aged 54) Thibodaux, Louisiana
- Resting place: Mount Olivet Cemetery, Nashville, Tennessee
- Party: Democratic
- Education: Cumberland School of Law; Washington University in St. Louis

Andrew Price (April 2, 1854 – February 5, 1909) was an American lawyer and politician who served four terms as a U.S. representative from Louisiana from 1889 to 1897.

== Biography ==
Born on Chatsworth plantation, near Franklin, St. Mary Parish, Louisiana, Price attended various private schools. He graduated from Cumberland School of Law at Cumberland University, Lebanon, Tennessee, in 1875, and from the Law Department of Washington University in St. Louis in 1877.

He was admitted to the bar and practiced in St. Louis, Missouri until 1880, when he returned to Louisiana and engaged in sugar planting. He was a delegate to the Democratic National Convention in 1888.

=== Congress ===
Price was elected as a Democrat to the Fifty-first Congress to fill the vacancy caused by the death of his father-in-law, Edward James Gay. He was reelected to the Fifty-second, Fifty-third, and Fifty-fourth Congresses and served from December 2, 1889, to March 3, 1897.

He was elected to these positions after participating in the Thibodaux massacre which claimed the lives of up to 60 innocent African Americans.

Price owned Clover Bottom Farm outside Nashville, Tennessee, which he and his wife used primarily as a summer home, and where he raised livestock and thoroughbred trotting horses.

=== Death and burial ===
He died at Acadia Plantation in Thibodaux, Lafourche Parish, Louisiana, on February 5, 1909. He was interred in Mount Olivet Cemetery, Nashville, Tennessee.

U.S. House of Representatives
Preceded by Edward James Gay	Member of the U.S. House of Representatives from Louisiana's 3rd congressional district December 2, 1889 – March 3, 1897	Succeeded by Robert Foligny Broussard
