= St. Gabriel Catholic Church (St. Gabriel, Louisiana) =

Church in St. Gabriel, Louisiana

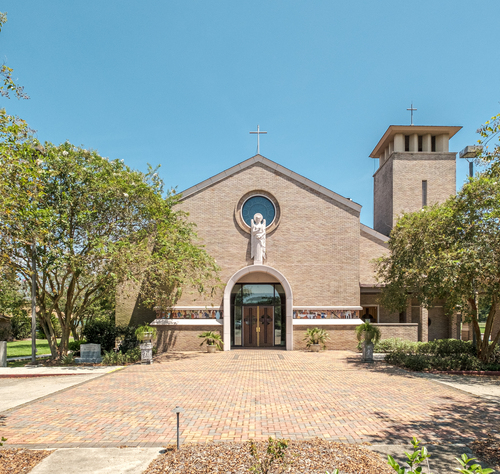
- The exterior of the new church, which stands on the same property as the old church.
- St. Gabriel Catholic Church
- Denomination: Catholic Church
- Website: www.stgabrielcatholicchurch.com

History
- Founded: 1770

Architecture
- Architectural type: Romanesque Revival
- Completed: 1953

Administration
- Diocese: Baton Rouge

Clergy
- Priest: Fr. Albert Blount
- St. Gabriel Roman Catholic Church
- U.S. National Register of Historic Places
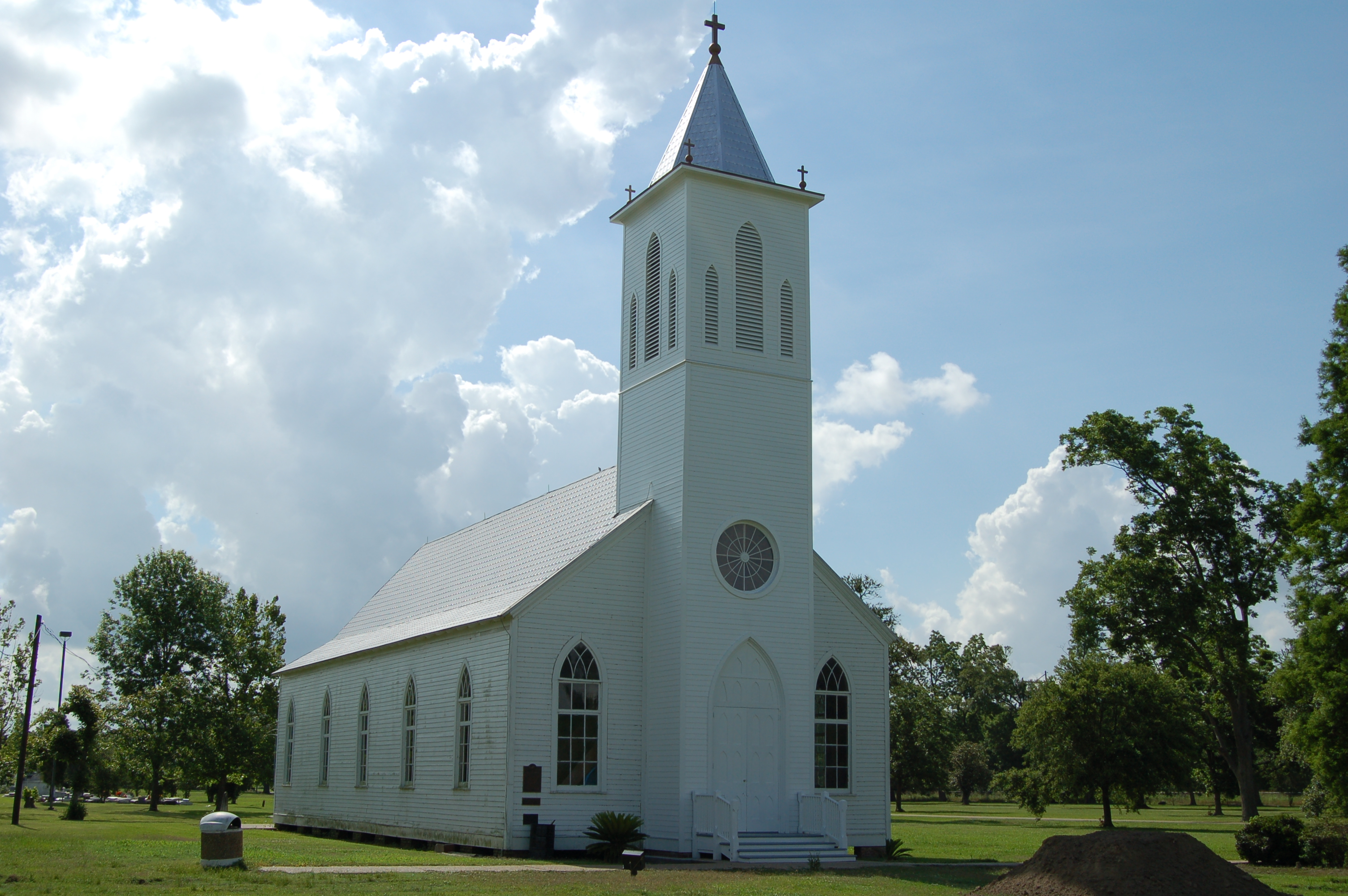

- Location within Louisiana Location within the United States
- Location: 3625 LA 75
- Nearest city: St. Gabriel, Louisiana
- Coordinates: 30°15′16″N 91°06′07″W
- Area: 37.65 acres (15.24 ha)
- Built: 1772
- Architectural style: Gothic
- NRHP reference No.: 72000555
- Added to NRHP: November 27, 1972

St. Gabriel Catholic Church is a church parish in St. Gabriel, Louisiana known to have its origins all the way back to 1761. It is noted as the oldest still standing church in the entirety of the Louisiana Purchase. The church parish includes a main church and the Sacred Heart Chapel in the neighborhood of Carville, Louisiana. The church is part of the Diocese of Baton Rouge and its current pastor is Father Albert Blount. The old parish church building was listed on the National Register of Historic Places on November 27, 1972.

== History ==
The church's history dates back to when the original white church building was completed in 1776. This church is thought to be the oldest church building on all of the territory gained from the Louisiana Purchase. Around the turn of the twentieth century, the church had to be moved a little further away from the river to what is now its actual site. The timbers were found to be in perfect condition and in the tower is the original bell of the parish, which is still used. It bears the inscription, "Sancta Maria de la Merced, Ora Pro Nobis-Se Hizo-Commendodos-MRPI Ygnacio de Jesus Maria-Ano de 1768." Father Vincent Isidore Kleinpeter, a pastor at St. Gabriel, believed a new church building was needed, but the old building should still stand on the site in which it was moved.

== Repairs ==
In 2008, Hurricane Gustav destroyed the original steeple of the original church. Following the hurricane, it was later repaired.

== See also ==
- Episcopal Church of the Nativity: also NRHP-listed in Iberville Parish
- St. John the Baptist Church: also NRHP-listed in Iberville Parish
- National Register of Historic Places listings in Iberville Parish, Louisiana
