= Iberville Parish Courthouse =

- U.S. National Register of Historic Places
- U.S. Historic district – Contributing property
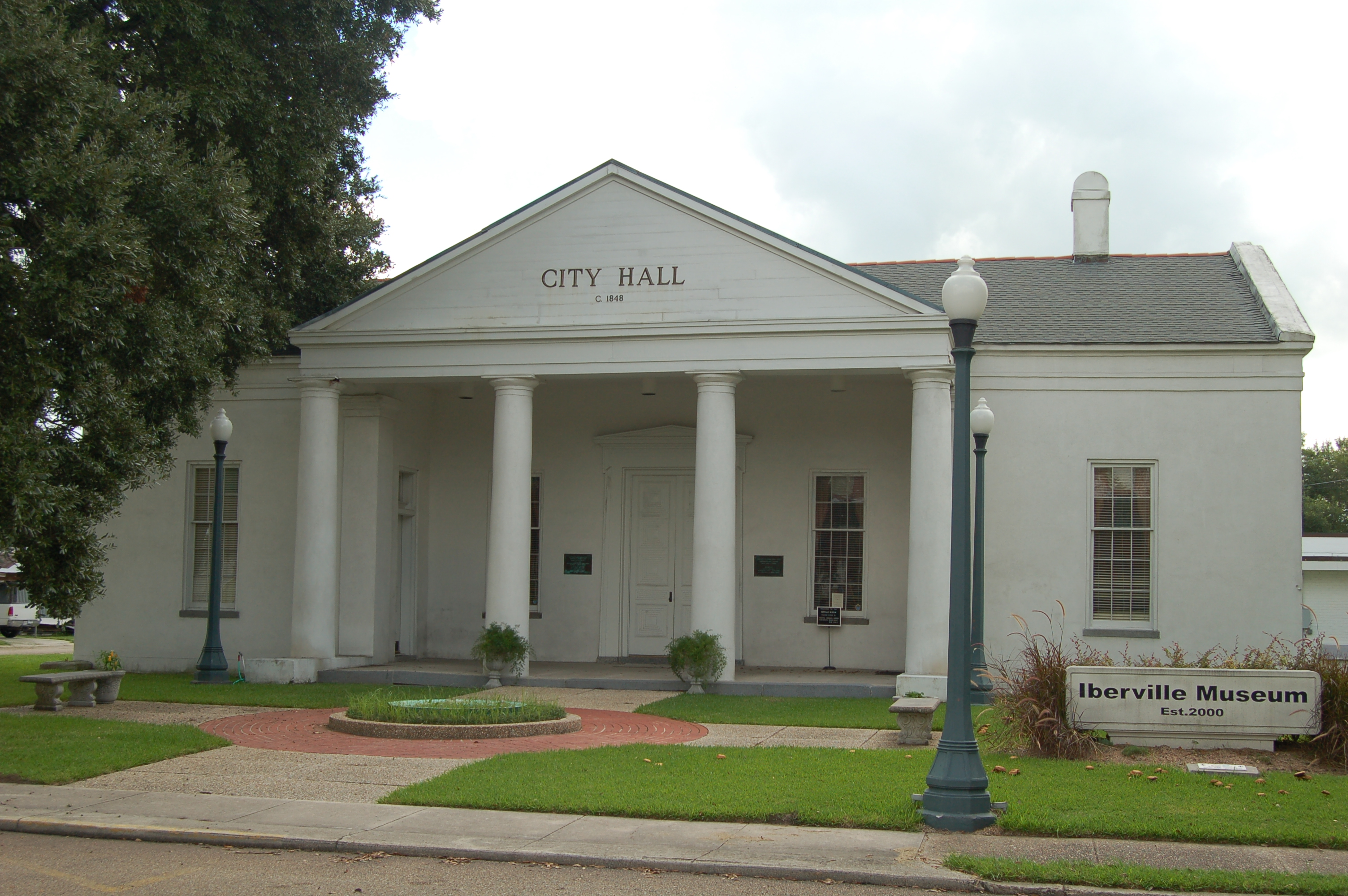

- Location within Louisiana Location within the United States
- Interactive map showing the location of Iberville Parish Courthouse
- Location: 57735 Main Street, Plaquemine, Louisiana
- Coordinates: 30°17′30″N 91°14′02″W
- Area: less than one acre
- Built: 1848
- Built by: George Weldon; Thomas Weldon
- Architectural style: Greek Revival
- Part of: Plaquemine Historic District (ID89001791)
- NRHP reference No.: 80001732

Significant dates
- Added to NRHP: May 31, 1980
- Designated CP: October 30, 1989

The Iberville Parish Courthouse is a historic building located at 57735 Main Street in Plaquemine, Louisiana.

Built in 1848 by George and Thomas Weldon, of Natchez, it served as a courthouse until 1906. It served as Plaquemine City Hall from 1906 until 1985, and was and later restored for its present use as Iberville Museum.

It is a stuccoed brick building in Greek Revival architecture that is five bays wide with a central, pedimented portico of four Doric columns.

The building was added to the National Register of Historic Places on May 31, 1980.

On October 7, 2025, 27-year-old Latrell Clark opened fire inside of the courthouse during booking process for a sexual assault investigation, killing a deputy and injuring a detective, before being fatally shot at the scene. Clark resisted arrest and attempted to disarm the detective, causing several shots to be fired. Clark and the deputy were transported to hospital where they were pronounced dead while the detective was in critical but stable condition.

== See also ==
- National Register of Historic Places listings in Iberville Parish, Louisiana
