= St. Louis Plantation =

Historic house in Louisiana, United States

- U.S. National Register of Historic Places
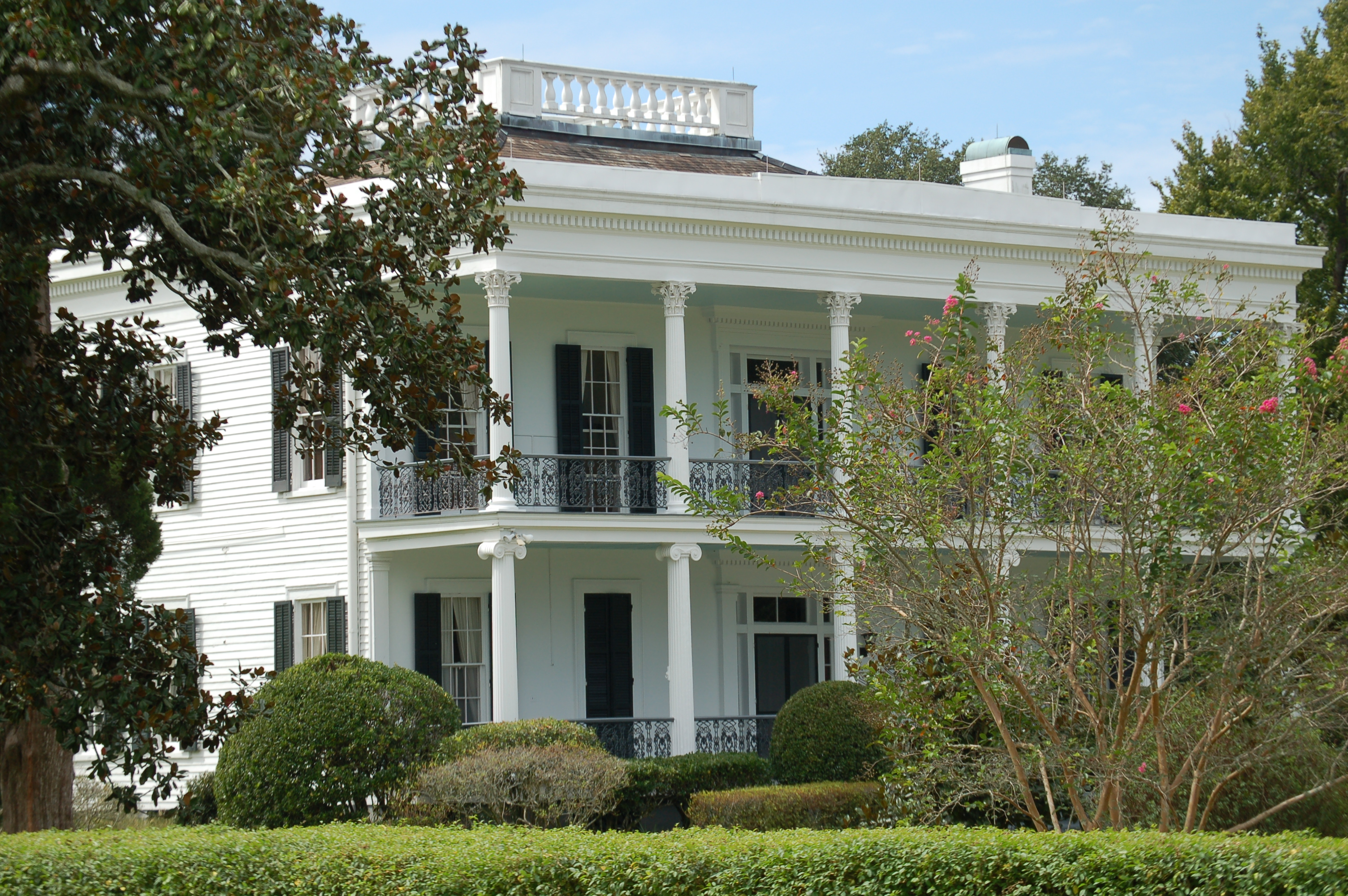

- Location within Louisiana Location within the United States
- Location: Along St. Louis Road, about 325 yards (297 m) southwest of River Road (LA 405)
- Nearest city: Plaquemine, Louisiana
- Coordinates: 30°16′25″N 91°12′44″W
- Area: 18 acres (7.3 ha)
- Built: 1858
- Built by: Edward James Gay
- Architectural style: Greek Revival, Italianate
- NRHP reference No.: 75000849
- Added to NRHP: December 3, 1975

The St. Louis Plantation is a Southern plantation with a historic mansion located in Iberville Parish, Louisiana, United States.

Built in 1858, the mansion was a replacement for a previous house named Erwin's Castle which was built in 1808 at the same location and was destroyed by a flood in the early 1850s. It was later owned by Edward J. Gay, a member of Congress. The two story frame cottage, covered with clapboards, is sitting on a brick basement. It shows elements of Greek Revival and Italianate architecture.

It was listed on the National Register of Historic Places on December 3, 1975.

== See also ==
- List of plantations in Louisiana
- National Register of Historic Places listings in Iberville Parish, Louisiana
