= Corner chair =

Type of chair with one leg in front

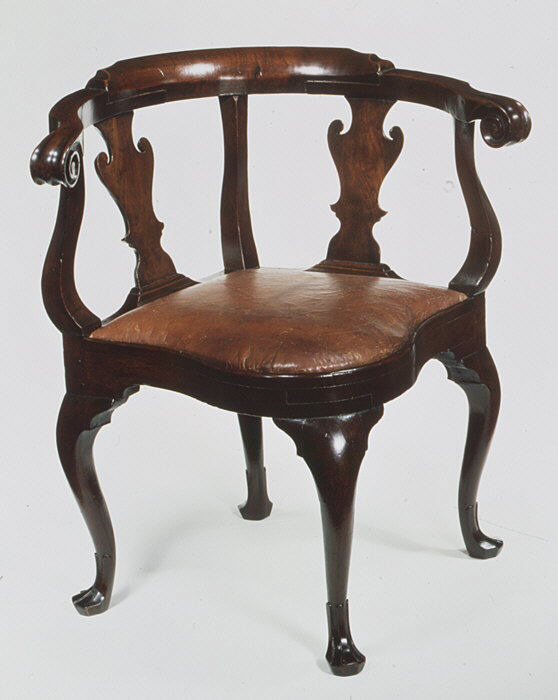
Corner chair (ca. 1740)

A corner chair is a chair design with a four-corner seat arranged in a way that one corner, sometimes rounded, frequently with a cabriole leg, is positioned in front while the rounded or angled backrest is aligned with the two back sides of the seat.

Quite popular in the 17th and 18th centuries, the corner chairs are currently mostly of interest as antique furniture pieces (a 1931 article describes the arrangement as "unusual"), although similar designs with the high angled back are used as medical assistance devices to maintain the upper trunk position (for example, in cases of cerebral palsy).

== History and terminology ==
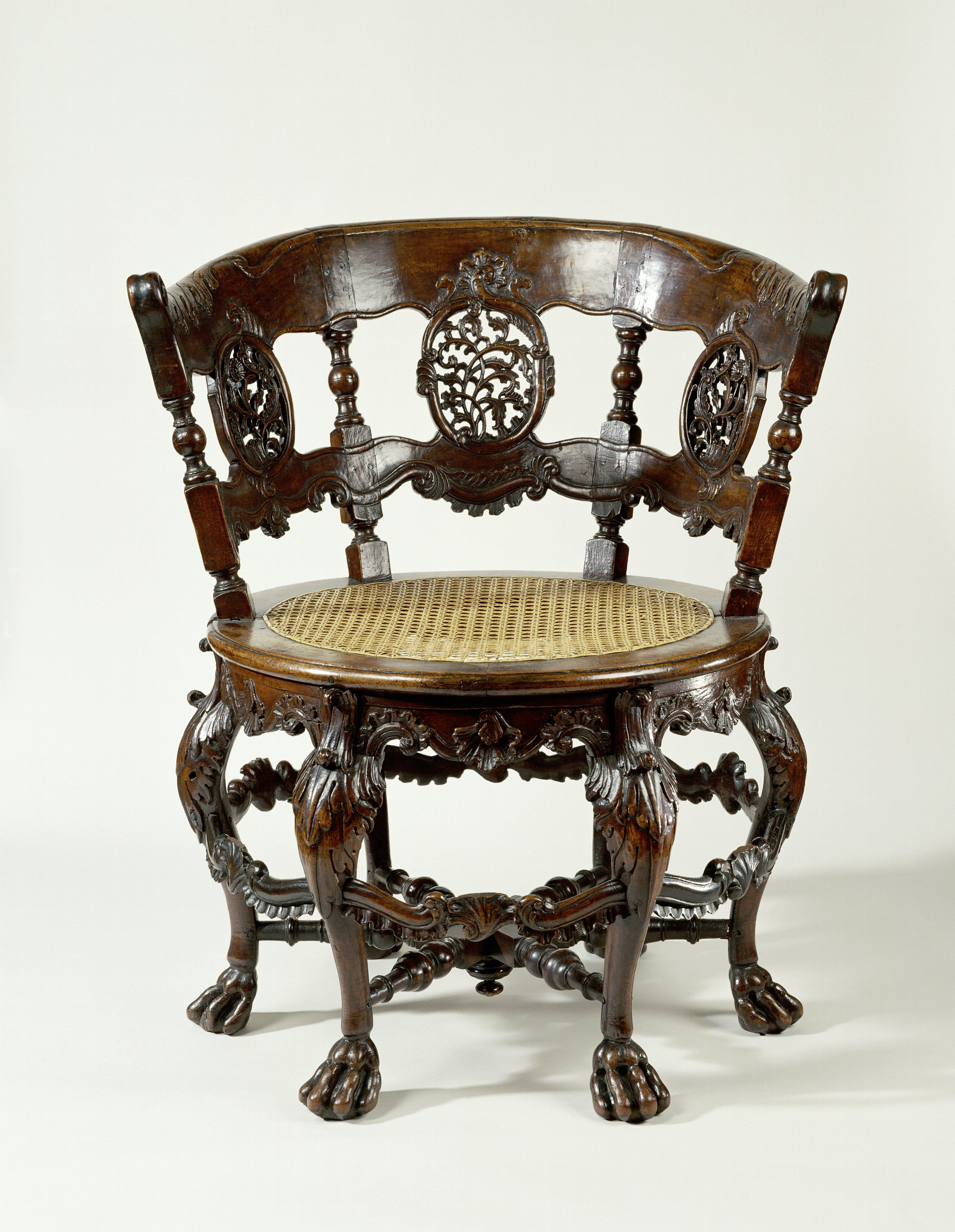
Burgomaster's chair (ca. 1750)

The origin of the corner chair can be traced to six- or eight-leg chairs of Chinese palaces with marble seats, sometimes rotating. The Chinese chairs inspired the Dutch (and English) designs in William and Mary and Queen Anne styles in the 17th and 18th centuries, these adaptations are called burgomaster chairs, as they were used as chairs of office in settlements (burgs). Initially the chairs retained the round shape of the Chinese prototypes (thus one more name, roundabout chairs, which in American English became a synonym of the corner chair, yet sometimes is still used to describe the older six- or eight- legged design with a round seat).

The corner chair got its name recently and was contemporarily known under a variety of names. Gloag states that the "roundabout" term was not contemporary, and the "burgomaster" name also appears to be modern. However, the term "round about chair" and many other, less popular, ones ("round chair", "three-cornered chair", "triangle chair", "half round chair") can be seen in the New England inventories as early as 1738.

By the time of brothers Adam the seats became more or less square, with one corner (and a leg) protruding in the front. The original purpose of these chairs is confusing as the visual form is frequently "ungainly". Pynt and Higgs argue that the primary goal was ergonomics; the designers tried to improve the position of spine for the task of writing (thus yet another name, writing chair), but also provide two other guesses by other researchers: a better presentation of a dress of a seated lady (unlikely, as a body position with feet apart was not socially acceptable at the time) and actually filling a corner of the room (although some chairs are fitted with the writing easel, making it impossible). The mass manufacturing of the corner chairs is associated with Colonial America (late 17th century); these chairs were mostly used as desk furniture, though they occasionally included heavy skirt (valance) so they can be used as a commode chair.

Drepperd does not consider the three-legged/three-cornered Flemish chairs of the 16th century to be ancestors of the corner chair, despite them being similar in appearance. Some Hogarth chairs might also resemble the corner chairs, but, strictly speaking, cannot be classified as such.

== Sources ==
- Drepperd, Carl W. (1948). "Corner Chairs". Handbook of Antique Chairs. Garden City, NY: The Country Life Press. pp. 93–102.
- Pynt, Jenny; Higgs, Joy (2010). A History of Seating, 3000 BC to 2000 AD: Function Versus Aesthetics. Cambria Press. p. 108. ISBN 978-1-60497-718-9. OCLC 647976589.
- Bishop, Robert (1972). Centuries and Styles of the American Chair, 1640-1970. Dutton. p. 110. ISBN 978-0-525-07826-5. OCLC 1008005262.
- Gloag, John (18 April 2013). "Roundabout Chair". A Short Dictionary Of Furniture. Read Books Ltd. ISBN 978-1-4474-9772-1. OCLC 1099027952.
- Hjorth, Herman (August 1931). "This corner chair combines grace and novelty". Popular Science Monthly: 106.
- Boyce, Charles (2 January 2014). "Roundabout Chair". Dictionary of Furniture: Second Edition. Simon and Schuster. ISBN 978-1-62873-840-7.
- Lyon, Irving Whitall (1891). The Colonial Furniture of New England: A Study of the Domestic Furniture in Use in the Seventeenth and Eighteenth Centuries. Houghton, Mifflin, & Company. p. 168. OCLC 17109692.
