= Episcopal Church of the Nativity (Rosedale, Louisiana) =

Historic church in Louisiana, United States

- Church of the Nativity
- U.S. National Register of Historic Places
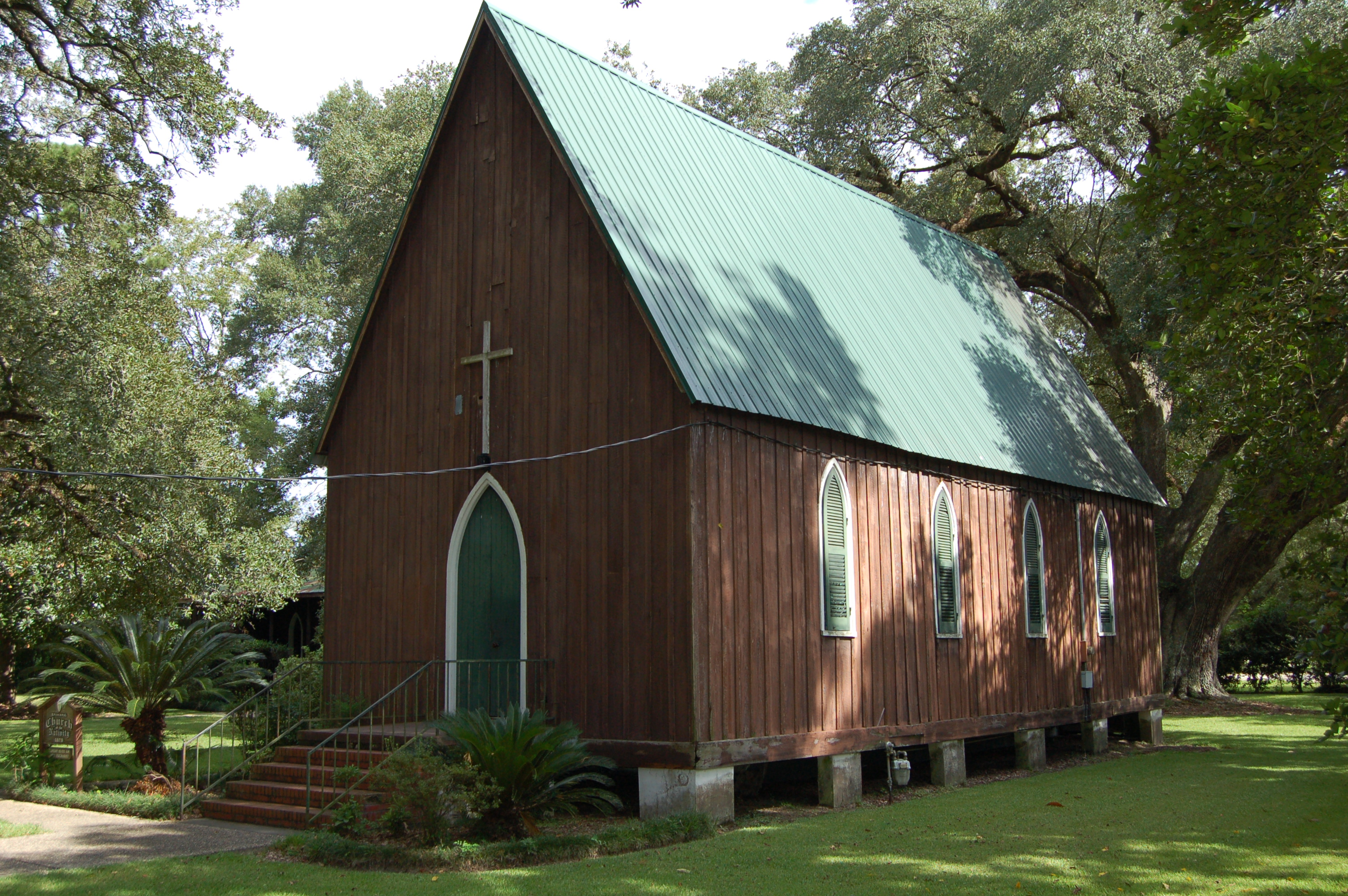

- Location within Louisiana Location within the United States
- Location: 15615 Laurel Street, Rosedale, Louisiana
- Coordinates: 30°26′42″N 91°27′08″W
- Area: 0.14 acres (0.057 ha)
- Built: 1859
- Architect: John Philson
- Architectural style: Gothic Revival
- NRHP reference No.: 82002775
- Added to NRHP: August 11, 1982

Church of the Nativity is a historic small Gothic Revival frame church building located at 15615 Laurel Street in Rosedale, Louisiana that is part of the Episcopal Diocese of Louisiana. The cathedral reported 59 members in 2015 and 35 members in 2023; no membership statistics were reported in 2024 parochial reports. Plate and pledge income reported for the congregation in 2024 was $49,143. Average Sunday attendance (ASA) in 2024 was 20 persons.

Built in 1859 by Mr. John Philson, the church was consecrated by Bishop Leonidas Polk on April 22, 1860. The simple rectangular three-bay structure with a steeply pitched roof has been altered very little since its construction.

The church was added to the National Register of Historic Places on August 11, 1982.

== See also ==
- St. Gabriel Catholic Church: also NRHP-listed in Iberville Parish
- St. John the Baptist Church: also NRHP-listed in Iberville Parish
- National Register of Historic Places listings in Iberville Parish, Louisiana
