= St. John the Baptist Church (Dorseyville, Louisiana) =

Historic church in Louisiana, United States

- St. John Baptist Church
- U.S. National Register of Historic Places
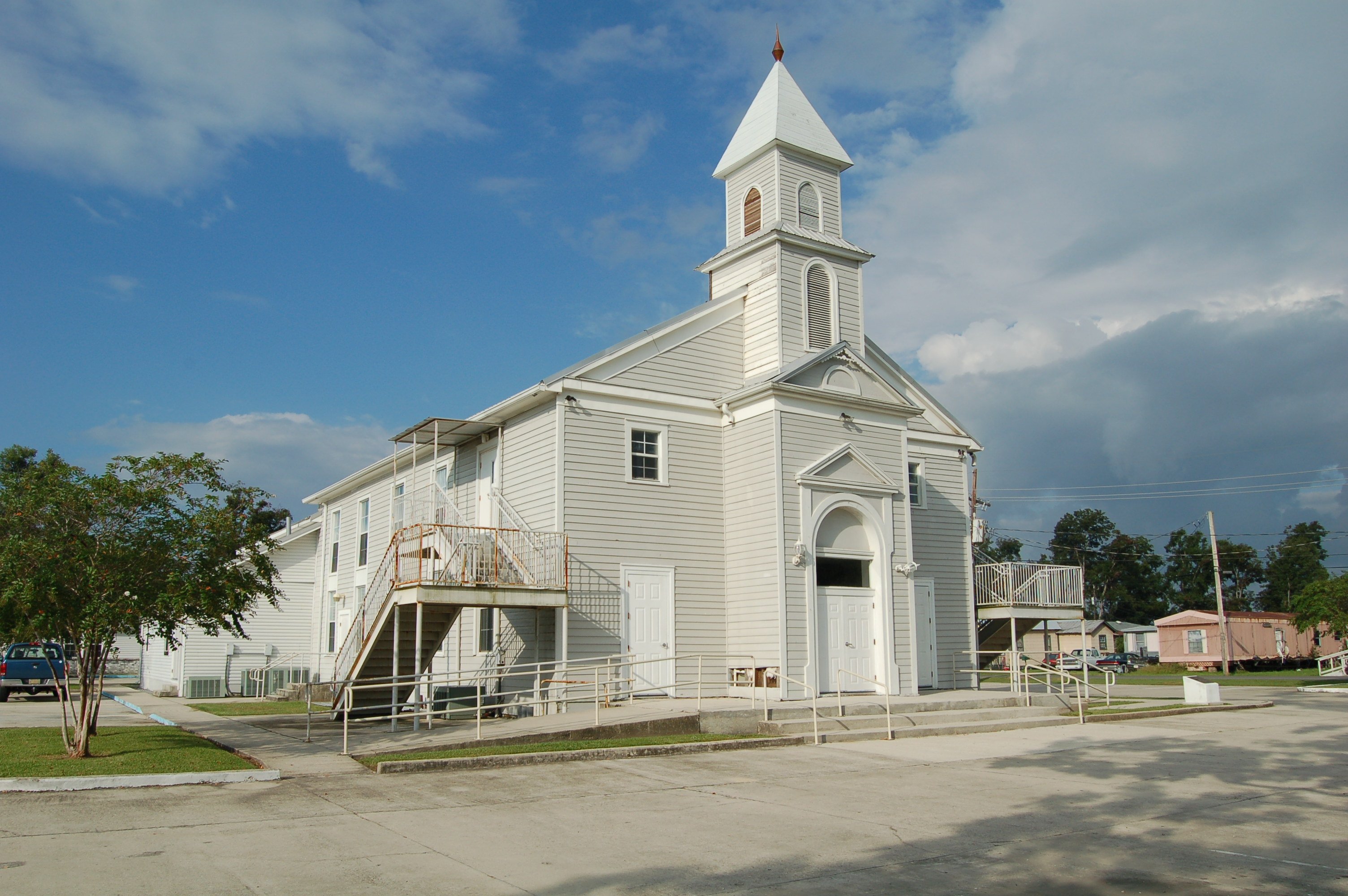

- Location within Louisiana Location within the United States
- Location: 31925 Lacroix Rd., Dorseyville, Louisiana
- Coordinates: 30°10′36″N 91°9′39″W
- Area: less than one acre
- Built: c. 1871
- Website: sjbcdorseyville.wixsite.com/1868
- NRHP reference No.: 93001549
- Added to NRHP: January 21, 1994

St. John the Baptist Church, or St. John Baptist Church, is a historic church at 31925 Lacroix Road in Dorseyville, Iberville Parish, Louisiana. It was constructed around 1871 to serve the local African American congregation.

Believed to be the oldest African-American church in the region, St. John Baptist was founded in 1868 by the Rev. Basile Dorsey, a black preacher and landowner after whom the village of Dorseyville was named.

The cornerstone was laid in 1869 and construction was completed around 1871. The church is a basilica church five bays deep, with a second story gallery on three sides of the interior. It is clapboarded with tall windows and mostly reflects the Greek Revival style of many rural churches of the era, though with a three-stage entrance tower at the center with Italianate details.

It was added to the National Register of Historic Places in 1994.

== See also ==
- Episcopal Church of the Nativity: also NRHP-listed in Iberville Parish
- St. Gabriel Catholic Church: also NRHP-listed in Iberville Parish
- National Register of Historic Places listings in Iberville Parish, Louisiana
