= Adam Brothers =

Adam Brothers may refer to:

Scottish architects, three sons of William Adam:

- John Adam (architect) (1721–1792)
- Robert Adam (1728–1792), also an interior designer and furniture designer
- James Adam (architect) (1732–1794), also a furniture designer

French sculptors, three sons of Jacob-Sigisbert Adam:

- Lambert-Sigisbert Adam (1700–1759)
- Nicolas-Sébastien Adam (1705–1778)
- François Gaspard Adam (1710–1761)

== See also ==
- Clerkenwell crime syndicate, composed of three brothers surnamed Adams
