= Dorseyville, Louisiana =

- Census-designated place
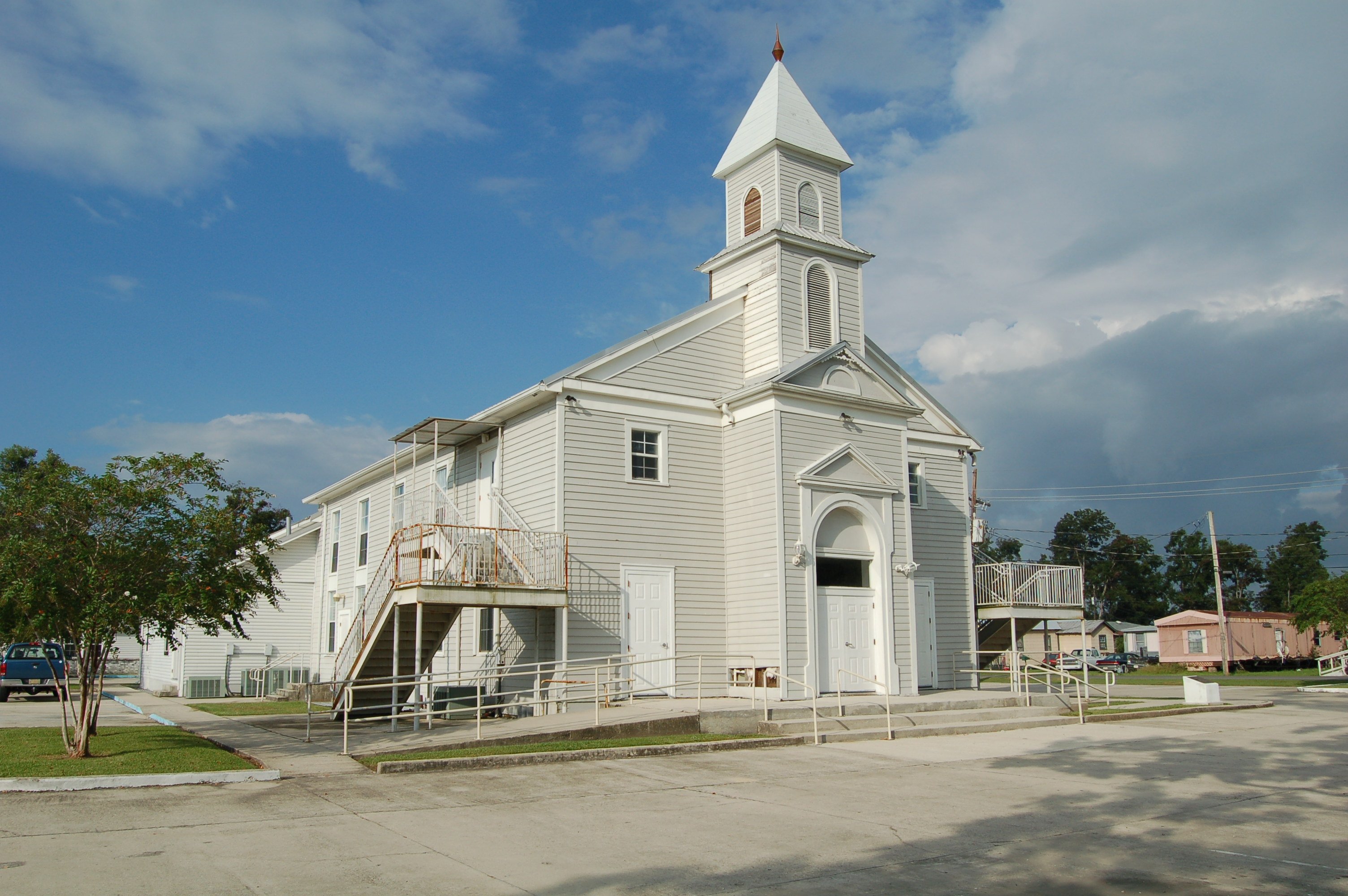
- The 1871 St. John Baptist Church

- Location within Louisiana Location within the United States
- Coordinates: 30°10′39″N 91°09′41″W
- Country: United States
- State: Louisiana
- Parish: Iberville

Area
  - Total: 0.15 sq mi (0.39 km^{2})
  - Land: 0.15 sq mi (0.39 km^{2})
  - Water: 0 sq mi (0.00 km^{2})
- Elevation: 20 ft (6.1 m)

Population (2020)
  - Total: 159
  - Density: 1,049.2/sq mi (405.08/km^{2})
- Time zone: UTC-6 (Central (CST))
  - Summer (DST): UTC-5 (CDT)
- ZIP Code: 70788 (White Castle)
- Area code: 225
- FIPS code: 22-21388
- GNIS feature ID: 2804547

Dorseyville is a census-designated place (CDP) in Iberville Parish, Louisiana, United States, corresponding to the unincorporated community of Dorcyville or Dorseyville. Dorseyville was first listed as a CDP prior to the 2020 census with a population of 159.

It is in the southeastern part of the parish, on the southwest bank of the Mississippi River. Louisiana Highway 1 forms the southern edge of the community, leading southeast 1 mile (1.6 km) to White Castle and northwest 9 miles (14 km) to Plaquemine.

== Demographics ==
Historical population
Census	Pop.	Note	%±
2020	159		—
U.S. Decennial Census; 2020

Dorseyville first appeared as a census designated place in the 2020 U.S. census.

Dorseyville CDP, Louisiana – Racial and ethnic composition Note: the US census treats Hispanic/Latino as an ethnic category. This table excludes Latinos from the racial categories and assigns them to a separate category. Hispanics/Latinos may be of any race.
Race / Ethnicity (NH = Non-Hispanic)	Pop 2020	% 2020
White alone (NH)	0	0.00%
Black or African American alone (NH)	159	100.00%
Native American or Alaska Native alone (NH)	0	0.00%
Asian alone (NH)	0	0.00%
Native Hawaiian or Pacific Islander alone (NH)	0	0.00%
Other race alone (NH)	0	0.00%
Mixed race or Multiracial (NH)	0	0.00%
Hispanic or Latino (any race)	0	0.00%
Total	159	100.00%
