= Bayou Goula, Louisiana =

- Census-designated place
- Location within Louisiana Location within the United States
- Coordinates: 30°12′38″N 91°10′36″W
- Country: United States
- State: Louisiana
- Parish: Iberville

Area
  - Total: 2.90 sq mi (7.50 km^{2})
  - Land: 2.44 sq mi (6.33 km^{2})
  - Water: 0.46 sq mi (1.18 km^{2})
- Elevation: 16 ft (4.9 m)

Population (2020)
  - Total: 514
  - Density: 210.4/sq mi (81.23/km^{2})
- Time zone: UTC-6 (Central (CST))
  - Summer (DST): UTC-5 (CDT)
- ZIP Code: 70788
- Area code: 225
- GNIS feature ID: 2586666
- FIPS code: 22-05350

Bayou Goula is an unincorporated community and census-designated place (CDP) in Iberville Parish, Louisiana, United States. Its population was 514 in 2020.

== Etymology ==
The name Bayou Goula comes from the historic tribe who lived in the region, the Bayagoula. Their Muskogean language name means "river people".

== Geography ==
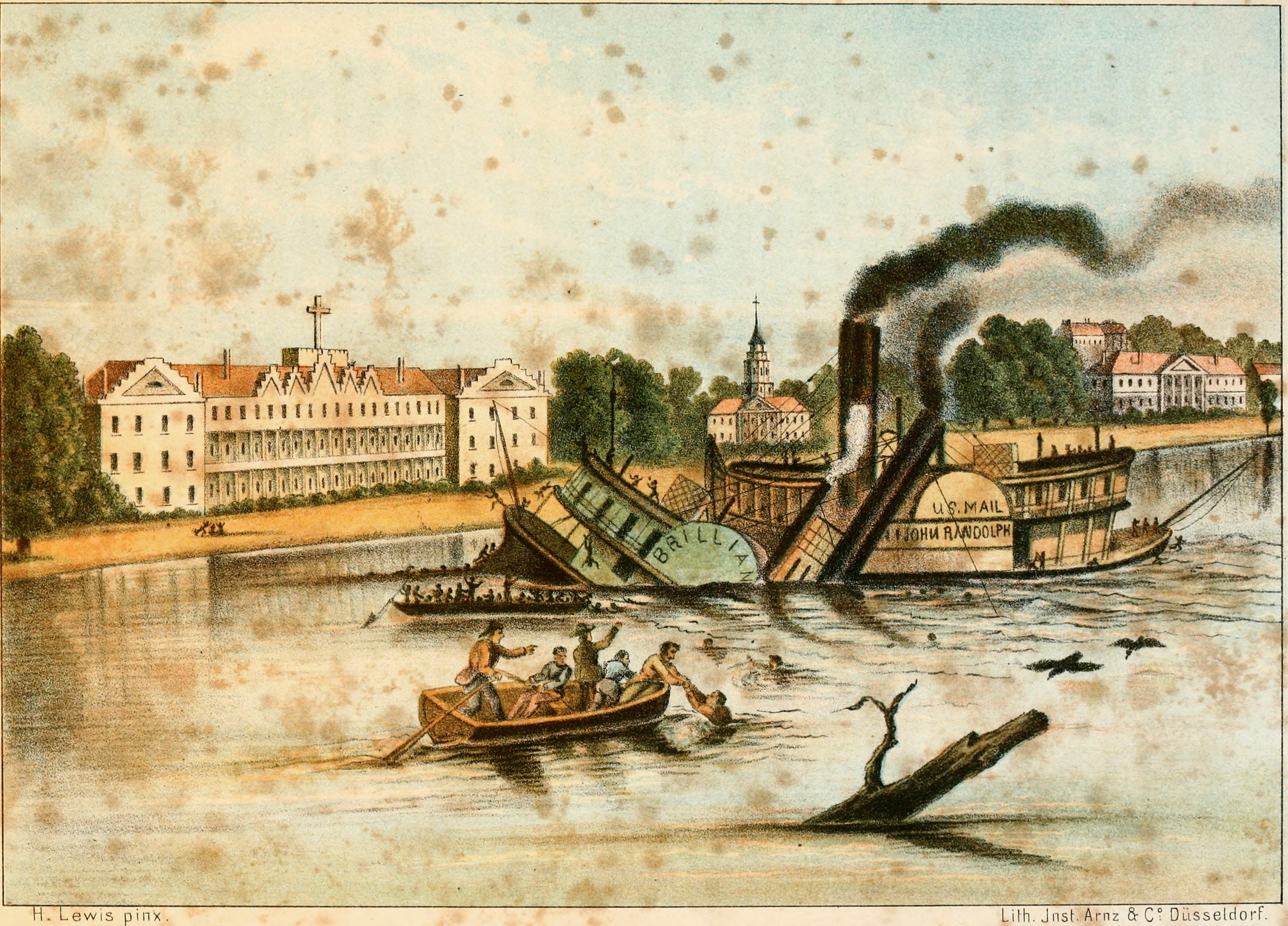
September 29, 1851 Steamboat "Brilliant" Boiler explosion on the Mississippi River by Bayou Goula, Louisiana; 47 killed

The community is in eastern Iberville Parish, on the west bank of the Mississippi River. It is 3.5 miles (5.6 km) north of White Castle and 7 miles (11 km) southeast of Plaquemine, the parish seat. According to the U.S. Census Bureau, the CDP has an area of 2.9 square miles (7.5 km^{2}), of which 2.4 square miles (6.3 km^{2}) are land and 0.46 square miles (1.2 km^{2}), or 15.67%, are water, within the Mississippi River.

== Demographics ==
Historical population
Census	Pop.	Note	%±
2010	612		—
2020	514		−16.0%
U.S. Decennial Census

Bayou Goula was first listed as a census designated place in the 2010 U.S. census. In 2020, it had a population of 514.

Bayou Goula CDP, Louisiana – Racial and ethnic composition Note: the US census treats Hispanic/Latino as an ethnic category. This table excludes Latinos from the racial categories and assigns them to a separate category. Hispanics/Latinos may be of any race.
Race / Ethnicity (NH = Non-Hispanic)	Pop 2010	Pop 2020	% 2010	% 2020
White alone (NH)	40	35	6.54%	6.81%
Black or African American alone (NH)	572	465	93.46%	90.47%
Native American or Alaska Native alone (NH)	0	0	0.00%	0.00%
Asian alone (NH)	0	0	0.00%	0.00%
Native Hawaiian or Pacific Islander alone (NH)	0	1	0.00%	0.19%
Other race alone (NH)	0	0	0.00%	0.00%
Mixed race or Multiracial (NH)	0	4	0.00%	0.78%
Hispanic or Latino (any race)	0	9	0.00%	1.75%
Total	612	514	100.00%	100.00%
