= Plaquemine Lock State Historic Site =

- Plaquemine Lock
- U.S. National Register of Historic Places
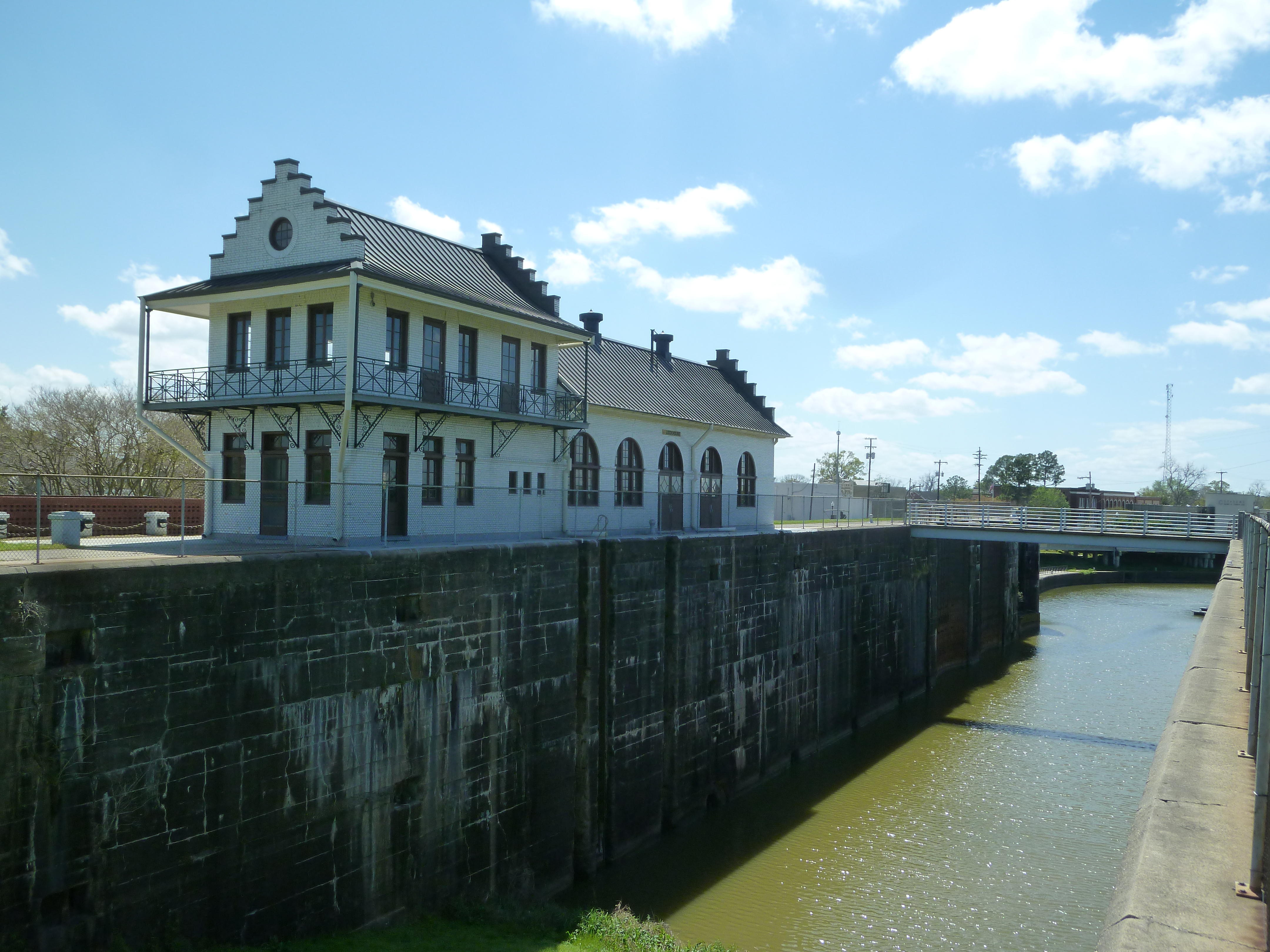
- A view of the lock on a sunny day.

- Location within Louisiana Location within the United States
- Location: U.S. Government Reservation at confluence of Bayou Plaquemine and the Mississippi River, Plaquemine, Louisiana
- Coordinates: 30°17′37″N 91°13′56″W
- Area: 14 acres (5.7 ha)
- Architect: Goethals, Col. George W.
- NRHP reference No.: 72000554
- Added to NRHP: May 19, 1972

Plaquemine Lock State Historic Site, located in Plaquemine, Louisiana, commemorates an early example of hydraulic engineering design and the historic significance of Bayou Plaquemine, an important navigable waterway that was once a distributary of the Mississippi River. Bayou Plaquemine promoted settlement beginning in the 18th century and helped the area economically by providing an access route between southwestern Louisiana (and thus Texas) and the Mississippi via the Atchafalaya Basin.

The lock itself was designed by Colonel George Washington Goethals of the United States Army Corps of Engineers, who later served as chief engineer of the construction of the Panama Canal Lock, and went on to be the Canal Zone's first governor. Plaquemine Lock was opened on April 9, 1909, after 14 years of construction. When it was built, Plaquemine Lock was the highest freshwater lift of any lock in the world. The lock initially utilized a gravity-flow principle until pumps were installed years later.

The lock was closed after 52 years of service in 1961 due to increased river traffic and the demand for a larger lock, which opened thereafter in Port Allen. The Plaquemine Lock structure was placed on the National Register of Historic Places in 1972. Today, the Gary James Hebert Memorial Lockhouse serves as an on-site museum and visitors center. It is named for the man who led the way to help preserve the Lock site, which today covers 19 acres (7.7 ha).
