= Hermitage =

Hermitage, or variants, may refer to:

== Common uses ==
- Hermitage (religious retreat), a place of religious seclusion
- The Hermitage (Nashville, Tennessee), US, the estate of Andrew Jackson
- Hermitage Museum, Saint Petersburg, Russia

== Buildings ==
=== Hotels ===
- Hermitage Hotel, in Nashville, US
- Hermitage Hotel, Bournemouth, England
- Hermitage Hotel, Mount Cook Village, New Zealand
- Hôtel Hermitage Monte-Carlo, Monaco
- L'Ermitage Beverly Hills, California, US

=== Other buildings in Australia ===
- The Hermitage (Australia), a school in Geelong, Victoria
- The Hermitage, Denistone, a historic house in Sydney, Australia
- The Hermitage, Vaucluse, a historic house in Sydney, Australia

=== Other buildings in the United Kingdom ===
- The Hermitage, Dunkeld, a National Trust for Scotland site
- The Hermitage, Friars Carse, a folly in Scotland used by Robert Burns
- The Hermitage, Hanwell, in the London Borough of Ealing, England

=== Other buildings in the United States ===
- Hermitage (Pasadena, California), listed on the National Register of Historic Places (NRHP) in Pasadena, California
- The Hermitage (New Castle, Delaware)
- Hermitage–Whitney Historic District, Englewood, Florida
- The Hermitage (Brookville, Indiana)
- The Hermitage (Goshen, Kentucky), listed on the NRHP in Kentucky
- Hermitage (Darrow, Louisiana)
- The Hermitage (La Plata, Maryland)
- The Hermitage (Ho-Ho-Kus, New Jersey)
- The Hermitage (Merry Hill, North Carolina)
- The Hermitage (Tillery, North Carolina)
- The Hermitage (Virginia Beach, Virginia)
- The Hermitage (Charles Town, West Virginia)

=== Other buildings elsewhere ===
- The Hermitage (Hamilton, Ontario), a historic house in Canada
- The Hermitage, a housing estate in Tai Kok Tsui, Hong Kong
- Hermitage House, a former mansion in County Limerick, Ireland
- Hermitage Hunting Lodge, north of Copenhagen, Denmark
- Hermitage Museum (Bayreuth), Germany
- Hermitage of Camaldoli, a monastery in Naples, Italy
- H'ART Museum, formerly Hermitage, Amsterdam, the Netherlands
- Hermitage (restaurant), in Rijsoord, the Netherlands
- Hermitage Municipal Theatre (Tula), Russia
- Hermitage Theatre, St. Petersburg, Russia

== Places ==
=== Australia ===
- The Hermitage, Queensland
- Upper Hermitage and Lower Hermitage, rural areas near Adelaide, South Australia
- Parish of Hermitage, New South Wales

=== United Kingdom ===
- Hermitage, Berkshire, England
  - Hermitage railway station
- Hermitage, Dorset, England
- Hermitage, Southbourne, West Sussex
- Hermitage, Scottish Borders
- Hermitage, a townland of County Fermanagh, Northern Ireland

=== United States ===
- Hermitage, Arkansas
- Hermitage, Louisiana
- Hermitage, Missouri
- Hermitage, Pennsylvania
- Hermitage, Tennessee
  - Hermitage station
- Hermitage, Saint Croix, U.S. Virgin Islands
- Hermitage, Saint John, U.S. Virgin Islands

=== Elsewhere ===
- Hermitage, Edmonton, Alberta, Canada
- Hermitage-Sandyville, Newfoundland, Canada
- Hermitage (Carriacou), Grenada
- Hermitage Island, Mauritius
- L'Hermitage, Brittany, France
- L'Hermitage-Lorge, Brittany, France

== People ==
- Georgina Hermitage (born 1989), British parasport athlete
- Robbyn Hermitage (born 1970), Canadian badminton player
- René de Saunière de l'Hermitage (1653–1729), English Huguenot exile

== Winemaking ==
- Hermitage AOC, French wine appellation
- Syrah, a grape variety formerly called Hermitage in Australia
- Cinsaut, a grape variety formerly called Hermitage in South Africa
- Marsanne, a grape variety also called Ermitage
- Trebbiano, an Italian grape variety also called Hermitage

== Other uses ==
- A Hermitage, a 2016 album by Jambinai
- Hermitage (album), 2021, by Moonspell
- Hermitage Capital Management, an investment fund specializing in Russian investment
- Hermitage Group, French real estate developer
- 4758 Hermitage, an asteroid
- USS Hermitage, the name of several ships

== See also ==
- Hermit (disambiguation)
- Hermitage Academy (disambiguation)
- Hermitage Arboretum, in the grounds of The Hermitage, Nashville, Tennessee, US
- Hermitage Castle, in the Scottish Borders
- Hermitage Dam in Saint Andrew Parish, Jamaica
- Hermitage Green, a hamlet near Winwick, Cheshire, England
- Hermitage High School (disambiguation), several schools
- Hermitage Manor, in Warwickshire, England
- Hermitage Motor Inn, in Petersburg, West Virginia, US
- Hermitage of Braid, a park and nature reserve in Edinburgh, Scotland
- Hermitage Peak (disambiguation)
- Hermitage Plantation (disambiguation)
- Hermitage Road Historic District, in Richmond, Virginia, US
- Hermitage Rooms, former gallery and museum space in London, England
- Hermitage School District (disambiguation)
- Hermitage Water, a river in the Scottish Borders
- Crozes-Hermitage, a commune of Drôme département, France
  - Crozes-Hermitage AOC, French wine appellation
- Guggenheim Hermitage Museum, in Paradise, Nevada, US
- Island Hermitage, a monastery on Dodanduwa Island, Sri Lanka
- Little Portion Hermitage, a religious community in Berryville, Arkansas, US
- Moscow Hermitage Garden, in Moscow, Russia
- New Camaldoli Hermitage, a Benedictine hermitage in Big Sur, California, US
- Tain-l'Hermitage, a town and commune of the Drôme department in France
- Warkworth Hermitage, in Northumberland, England
