= Ashland Plantation =

Historic house in Louisiana, United States

- Ashland
- U.S. National Register of Historic Places
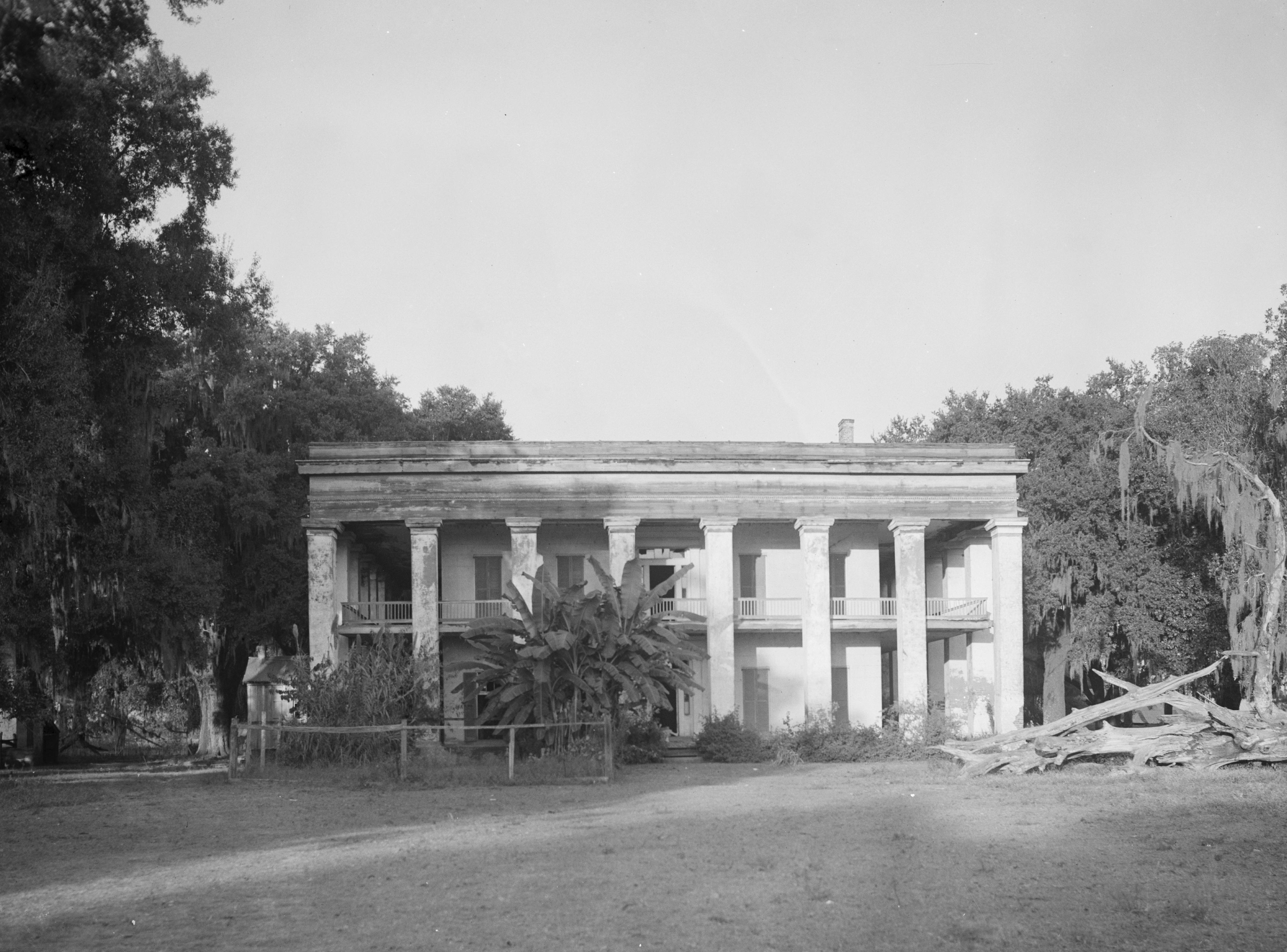
- Front of Ashland.

- Location within Louisiana Location within the United States
- Location: On Ashland Road, about 400 yards (370 m) northeast of intersection with Louisiana Highway 75
- Nearest city: Geismar, Louisiana
- Coordinates: 30°10′34″N 90°59′54″W
- Area: 34 acres (14 ha)
- Built: 1841
- Architect: James Gallier, Sr.
- Architectural style: Greek Revival
- NRHP reference No.: 79001050
- Added to NRHP: May 4, 1979

Ashland Plantation, also known as the Belle Helene or Ashland-Belle Helene Plantation, is a historic building, built in 1841, that was a plantation estate and home of Duncan Farrar Kenner. Located in Darrow, Louisiana, in Ascension Parish. The manor house is an example of antebellum Greek Revival architecture.

The plantation was listed on the National Register of Historic Places in 1979.

== Location ==
The Ashland estate is located south of Geismar, Louisiana on Highway 3251 (Ashland Road), shortly northeast of its intersection with Louisiana Highway 75. The entire property of the estate belongs to and is surrounded by the Shell Chemical, LP, Geismar plant.

== History ==
By 1830, William Kenner and his brother-in-law Philip Minor consolidated 1,800 acres of land to form a sugar plantation. After William died, his two sons Duncan Kenner and George R. Kenner inherited the property. In 1840 the Kenner brothers acquired the Oakland, Belle Grove, and Pasture Plantations. Kenner was a man of considerable wealth and holdings. He acquired land and property that included not only what was to be named the Ashland Plantation and mansion that he built for his wife, Anne Guillemine Nanine Bringier, but also interests in the Bowden (1858), The Houmas, the 1400-acre Hollywood, the Hermitage (his wife was the granddaughter of Emmanuel Marius Pons Bringier), the Fashion (home of his brother-in-law and partner General Richard Taylor), and Roseland plantations. Supported by the forced labor of enslaved people, Kenner was a horseman (with a race track built at Ashland), a lawyer, a gambler, an inventor, and a politician. Property also included leases in the New Basin Canal in New Orleans with Taylor. Kenner helped organize the New Orleans Jockey Club and the New Louisiana Jockey Club.

Construction on the mansion began in 1839, was completed in 1841, and presented to Kenner's wife. Built in the traditional antebellum Greek Revival style, the sixty-foot square, two-story home has 28 columns, each three feet square and thirty-five feet high. It has been called the "grandest and largest plantation house ever built in the state." Twelve-foot wide galleries wrap around the building on both floors. The building had eight Italian-marble fireplaces which were destroyed by vandals in 1959.

In 1844, Duncan Kenner bought out his brother's share in the plantation and named it Ashland Plantation after Henry Clay's estate.

Ashland Plantation was confiscated by the Freedmen's Bureau in 1865 but returned to Kenner in 1866 after Kenner swore an oath of allegiance to the Union.

On March 2, 1889, the Ashland-Bowden Plantation property was auctioned, being adjudicated to Hypolite P. Ousset for $85,100.00 (COB 34, Folio 425, Ascension Parish). The purchase price excluded the furniture and contents of the great house, the store, and the sugar, molasses, and rice crops of 1888. (COB 34, 425, Ascension Parish). Ousset sold the property to George Balthazar Reuss a few days later for $75,000.00. George renamed the plantation Belle Helene in honor of his infant daughter, Helene Eleanor Reuss.

In the 1897-98 planting year Belle Helene was the second-best sugar-producing farm in the area.

Helene Reuss became Mrs. W.C. Hayward, Sr. (She was named after her great-aunt, Helena Lotz.) From 1939 to 1946 the mansion was unoccupied and unattended, but in 1946 the Hayward family began a major restoration. By 1959 the grounds were empty again and subject to vandalism.

Records indicate the invention of a decortication machine by Duncan Kenner and Leonard Sewell (1880s).

Excavations were done in 1989, and again in 1992, this time by Earth Search, Inc., for Shell after acquisition. Evidence of the sugar house, 18 slave cabins, an overseer's house, a blacksmith shop, and other buildings were examined.

== Abe Hawkins ==
Duncan Kenner had a race track, raced horses, and in 1854 a slave named Abe Hawkins, riding Lecomte, won over a horse named Lexington in New Orleans. Abe was inducted into the Louisiana Racing Museum Hall of Fame in 1997. While Kenner was absent from Louisiana the Civil War ended. Abe left the plantation and in 1866 won the third running of the Travers Stakes, riding Merrill for Robert A. Alexander. The trainer was another former slave named Ansel Williamson. In attendance that day were Ulysses S. Grant, William Astor, Alexander Stewart, and Commodore Vanderbilt. Abe beat top Caucasian jockey Gilbert Patrick Watson in a match race before 25,000 fans in New York City.

Abe Hawkins was known as "Uncle Able Hawkins: The Black Prince”, “The Dark Sage of Louisiana”, “The Slayer of Lexington” and got his start at Ashland as a slave. Abe won at Saratoga in 1866, and the very next year returned to Ashland where he died of tuberculosis. He earned respect and was a renowned jockey; but he never made it into the National Museum of Racing and Hall of Fame, nor the American Racing Hall of Fame.

== Shell ownership ==
Shell Oil Company purchased the estate, including 102 acres, from the Hayward family in 1992, remodeled the exterior to the original colors, and replaced the roof for preservation in 1997. Complete and total restoration was completed in 2015 by Shell Chemicals LP., Geismar and is currently used for private corporate and employee functions.

== In popular culture ==
The mansion was shown in several movies, including Band of Angels (1957) where it also appeared on the movie poster; The Beguiled (1971), The Autobiography of Miss Jane Pittman (1971), Mandingo (1975), The Long, Hot Summer (1985) and Fletch Lives (1989).

== See also ==
- National Register of Historic Places listings in Ascension Parish, Louisiana
