= Abe Hawkins =

African American jockey

Personal information
- Died: May 4, 1867 Darrow, Louisiana
- Resting place: Ashland Plantation
- Occupations: Sugar plantation slave: Jockey

Horse racing career
- Sport: Horse racing

Major racing wins
- Jerome Stakes (1866); Travers Stakes (1866)

Honors
- Fair Grounds Racing Hall of Fame (1997); National Museum of Racing and Hall of Fame (2024)

Significant horses
- Arrow, Asteroid, Lecomte, Louis d'Or, Merrill, Minnehaha, Panic, Rhynodine, Whale
- Updated on April 24, 2024

Abe Hawkins, also known in later years as Uncle Able Hawkins, The Black Prince, The Dark Sage of Louisiana, and The Slayer of Lexington, was a slave on the Ashland sugar plantation located in Darrow, Louisiana, in Ascension Parish. Duncan Farrar Kenner owned the plantation and for ten years Abe was his slave. He rode some 25 horses to victory.

Kenner was a businessman that owned and raced horses with a track located on the plantation grounds. In 1854, Kenner purchased slave jockey Abe Hawkins. Abe was considered small and of "light figure" and suited to being a jockey. Abe rode for Kenner until he became a freeman in 1864, and then for Robert A. Alexander and was nationally known for fifteen years.

By 1865, Abe was rated the second best known athlete behind white jockey Gilbert Watson Patrick, known as Gilpatrick, and won against him in a match race before a crowd of 25,000 in New York City. Abe had a career twenty-five wins, including the two 1866 wins while under the employ of Robert A. Alexander, the Travers Stakes riding Merrill with former slave trainer Ansel Williamson, and the first Jerome Stakes riding Watson with trainer Jacob Pincus.

Abe returned to Ashland in 1866 and lived there until he died on May 4, 1867.

In 2024 Hawkins was selected for induction into the National Museum of Racing and Hall of Fame by its Historic Review Committee.
