= Hermitage, United States Virgin Islands =

Hermitage, United States Virgin Islands

- Hermitage, Saint Croix, United States Virgin Islands
- Hermitage, Saint John, United States Virgin Islands
