= National Register of Historic Places listings in Ascension Parish, Louisiana =

Location of Ascension Parish in Louisiana

This is a list of the National Register of Historic Places listings in Ascension Parish, Louisiana.

This is intended to be a complete list of the properties and districts on the National Register of Historic Places in Ascension Parish, Louisiana, United States. The locations of National Register properties and districts for which the latitude and longitude coordinates are included below, may be seen in a map.

There are 17 properties and districts listed on the National Register in the parish. Another three properties were once listed but have been removed.

This National Park Service list is complete through NPS recent listings posted December 12, 2025.

== Current listings ==
	Name on the Register	Image	Date listed	Location	City or town	Description
1	Ashland	Ashland	May 4, 1979 (#79001050)	On Ashland Road, about 400 yards (370 m) northeast of intersection with Louisiana Highway 75; 30°10′34″N 90°59′54″W	Geismar	Also known as Belle Helene
2	Bocage	Bocage	June 20, 1991 (#91000705)	On River Road, about 100 yards (91 m) north of intersection with St. Elmo Street; 30°07′25″N 90°57′19″W	Darrow	
3	Dixon House	Dixon House	May 27, 1999 (#99000634)	On Louisiana Highway 42, about 50 yards (46 m) east of intersection with North Lake Drive; 30°19′12″N 90°58′19″W	Prairieville	Also known as Moore House. The dormer's balcony has been removed since the time of listing.
4	Donaldsonville Historic District	Donaldsonville Historic District	January 19, 1984 (#84001248)	Roughly bounded by Bayou LaFourche, the Mississippi River levee, Jackson Street, Marchand Drive, Monroe Street and Church Street; 30°06′10″N 90°59′17″W	Donaldsonville	The 125 acres (51 ha) area historic district comprises 492 contributing properties built between 1806 and 1933. Photo shows the Ascension Parish Courthouse on Houmas Street, built c. 1890
5	Evan Hall Slave Cabins	Evan Hall Slave Cabins	September 20, 1983 (#83000484)	Along Louisiana Highway 405, about 150 yards (140 m) northeast of intersection with Louisiana Highway 1; 30°07′05″N 91°02′41″W	Donaldsonville	
6	Fort Butler	Fort Butler	February 25, 1999 (#99000183)	Address restricted	Donaldsonville	Monument marks the location of a Fort and a Civil War battle fought on the 28th of June 1863.
7	Helvetia Dependency	Helvetia Dependency	June 4, 1992 (#92000570)	At the end of a dirt road, about 1.5 miles (2.4 km) east of Darrow and 0.3 miles (0.48 km) north of River Road; 30°07′03″N 90°57′40″W	Darrow	Part of Louisiana's French Creole Architecture MPS.
8	The Hermitage	The Hermitage	April 13, 1973 (#73000859)	At the end of a dirt road, about 1.5 miles (2.4 km) east of Darrow and 0.25 miles (0.40 km) north of River Road; 30°07′00″N 90°57′43″W	Darrow	Built in 1812, originally L'Hermitage in French – named after Andrew Jackson's Tennessee home The Hermitage. General & Mrs. Jackson reportedly visited here during an 1820s trip to New Orleans.
9	The Houmas	The Houmas	September 27, 1980 (#80001694)	About 0.63 miles (1.01 km) west of intersection of River Road and Louisiana Highway 44; 30°08′28″N 90°56′03″W	Burnside	Large Greek Revival mansion built in 1840, adjacent to an earlier Federal-style house and several other ancillary structures including octagonal garconnieres
10	Landry Tomb	Landry Tomb	August 11, 1982 (#82002752)	Ascension Catholic Church Cemetery, corner of St. Vincent Street and Claiborne Street; 30°05′58″N 90°59′09″W	Donaldsonville	Circa-1845 family monument attributed to architect James H. Dakin. Also a contributing property to Donaldsonville Historic District
11	The Lemann Store	The Lemann Store	August 11, 1982 (#82002753)	314-318 Mississippi Street; 30°06′22″N 90°59′15″W	Donaldsonville	Also a contributing property to Donaldsonville Historic District
12	Mulberry Grove	Mulberry Grove	October 14, 1993 (#93001118)	Along Louisiana Highway 405, about 7 miles (11 km) northeast of White Castle; 30°11′29″N 91°02′06″W	White Castle	
13	Palo Alto Dependency	Palo Alto Dependency	June 4, 1992 (#92000579)	Along Louisiana Highway 944, about 280 yards (260 m) west of intersection with Louisiana Highway 1; 30°05′29″N 91°01′55″W	Donaldsonville	
14	Palo Alto Plantation	Palo Alto Plantation	April 13, 1977 (#77000665)	Northwest of the junction of Louisiana Highway 1 with Louisiana Highway 944; 30°05′27″N 91°01′48″W	Donaldsonville	
15	Rome House	Rome House	March 8, 1990 (#90000323)	On Louisiana Highway 1, northeast of intersection with Delaney Road; 30°06′32″N 91°01′12″W	Smoke Bend	
16	St. Emma	St. Emma	June 30, 1980 (#80001695)	Along Louisiana Highway 1, about 300 yards (270 m) south of intersection with Louisiana Highway 943; 30°05′03″N 91°01′50″W	Donaldsonville	
17	Robert Penn Warren House	Robert Penn Warren House	January 7, 1993 (#92001732)	16381 Old Jefferson Highway; 30°18′30″N 90°58′25″W	Prairieville	Also known as Twin Oaks

== Former listings ==
	Name on the Register	Image	Date listed	Date removed	Location	City or town	Description
1	Kraemer House	Kraemer House	August 2, 1984 (#84001250)	July 22, 2016	South of Louisiana Highway 929, about 0.5 miles (0.80 km) east of intersection with U.S. Route 61; 30°17′54″N 90°57′44″W	Prairieville	Demolished some time after 1984.
2	St. Joseph's School	St. Joseph's School	November 17, 1988 (#88002651)	June 9, 2010	Northwest corner of Louisiana Highway 22 and Louisiana Highway 44; 30°09′00″N 90°55′24″W	Burnside	
3	Tezcuco	Tezcuco	March 3, 1983 (#83000485)	January 31, 2019	Along Louisiana Highway 44, about 1.7 miles (2.7 km) southeast of Burnside; 30°06′56″N 90°54′37″W	Burnside	Completely destroyed by fire in May 2002

== See also ==
- List of National Historic Landmarks in Louisiana
- National Register of Historic Places listings in Louisiana
