= Louisiana's 59th House of Representatives district =

American legislative district

Louisiana's 59th State House of Representatives district
Representative
Tony Bacala; R–Prairieville

Louisiana's 59th House of Representatives district is one of 105 Louisiana House of Representatives districts. It is currently represented by Republican Tony Bacala of Prairieville.

== Geography ==
HD59 includes a small part of the Baton Rouge metropolitan area, including part of the census-designated place of Prarieville.

== Election results ==
Year	Winning candidate	Party	Percent	Opponent	Party	Percent	Opponent	Party	Percent
2011	Eddie Lambert	Republican	100%						
2015	Tony Bacala	Republican	66%	Pat Bell	Republican	25.1%	Rusty Messer	Republican	8.9%
2019	Tony Bacala	Republican	100%						
2023	Tony Bacala	Republican	Cancelled						
