= Hermitage, U.S. Virgin Islands =

Hermitage, U.S. Virgin Islands may refer to:

- Hermitage, Saint Croix, U.S. Virgin Islands
- Hermitage, Saint John, U.S. Virgin Islands
