= L'Hermitage Plantation =

L'Hermitage Plantation may refer to:

- Hermitage (Darrow, Louisiana)
- L'Hermitage Slave Village Archeological Site on the grounds of the former l'Hermitage Plantation near Frederick, Maryland.
- The Hermitage (Nashville, Tennessee), home of Andrew Jackson
