= Louisiana's 18th State Senate district =

American legislative district

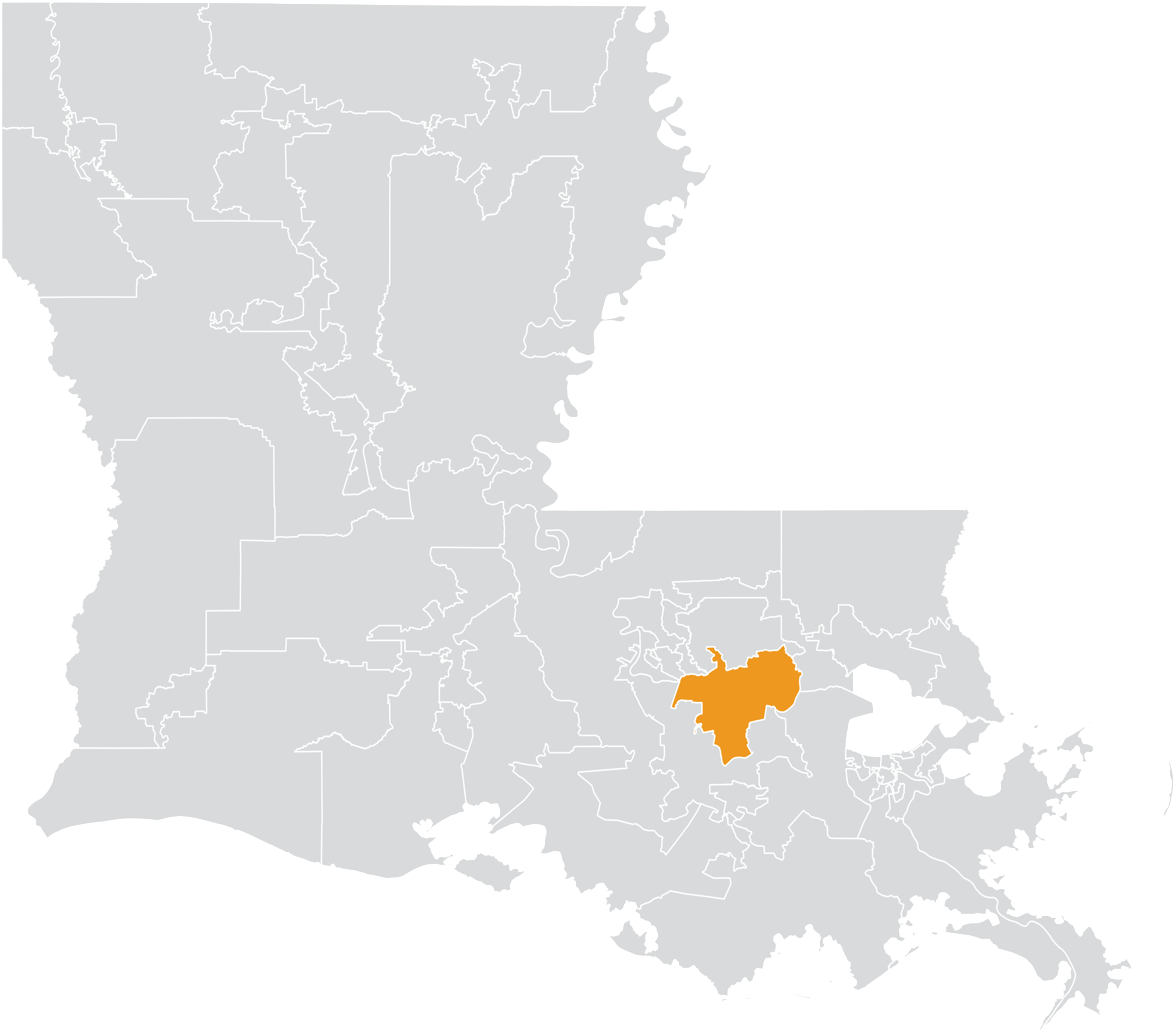
Senator
Eddie Lambert; R–Prairieville
- Registration: 40.4% Republican; 30.6% Democratic; 29.0% No party preference
- Demographics: 78% White; 14% Black; 5% Hispanic; 1% Asian; 2% Other
- Population (2019): 132,905
- Registered voters: 83,165

Louisiana's 18th State Senate district is one of 39 districts in the Louisiana State Senate. It has been represented by Republican Eddie Lambert since 2016.

== Geography ==
District 18 covers parts of Ascension, Livingston, and St. James Parishes to the east of Baton Rouge, including some or all of Gonzales, Sorrento, Prairieville, Killian, and Lutcher.

The district overlaps with Louisiana's 2nd and 6th congressional districts, and with the 58th, 59th, 81st, 88th, and 95th districts of the Louisiana House of Representatives.

== Recent election results ==
Louisiana uses a jungle primary system. If no candidate receives 50% in the first round of voting, when all candidates appear on the same ballot regardless of party, the top-two finishers advance to a runoff election.

=== 2019 ===
2019 Louisiana State Senate election, District 18
Party	Candidate	Votes	%
Republican	Eddie Lambert (incumbent)	Unopposed	100
Total votes		Unopposed	100

=== 2015 ===
2015 Louisiana State Senate election, District 18
Party	Candidate	Votes	%
Republican	Eddie Lambert	Unopposed	100
Total votes		Unopposed	100
Republican hold			

=== 2011 ===
2011 Louisiana State Senate election, District 18
Party	Candidate	Votes	%
Republican	Jody Amedee (incumbent)	Unopposed	100
Total votes		Unopposed	100
Republican hold			

=== Federal and statewide results ===
Year	Office	Results
2020	President	Trump 75.7–22.5%
2019	Governor (runoff)	Rispone 60.9–39.1%
2016	President	Trump 75.1–21.1%
2015	Governor (runoff)	Vitter 53.4–46.6%
2014	Senate (runoff)	Cassidy 73.0–27.0%
2012	President	Romney 75.3–22.8%
