= Dixon House (Prairieville, Louisiana) =

- U.S. National Register of Historic Places
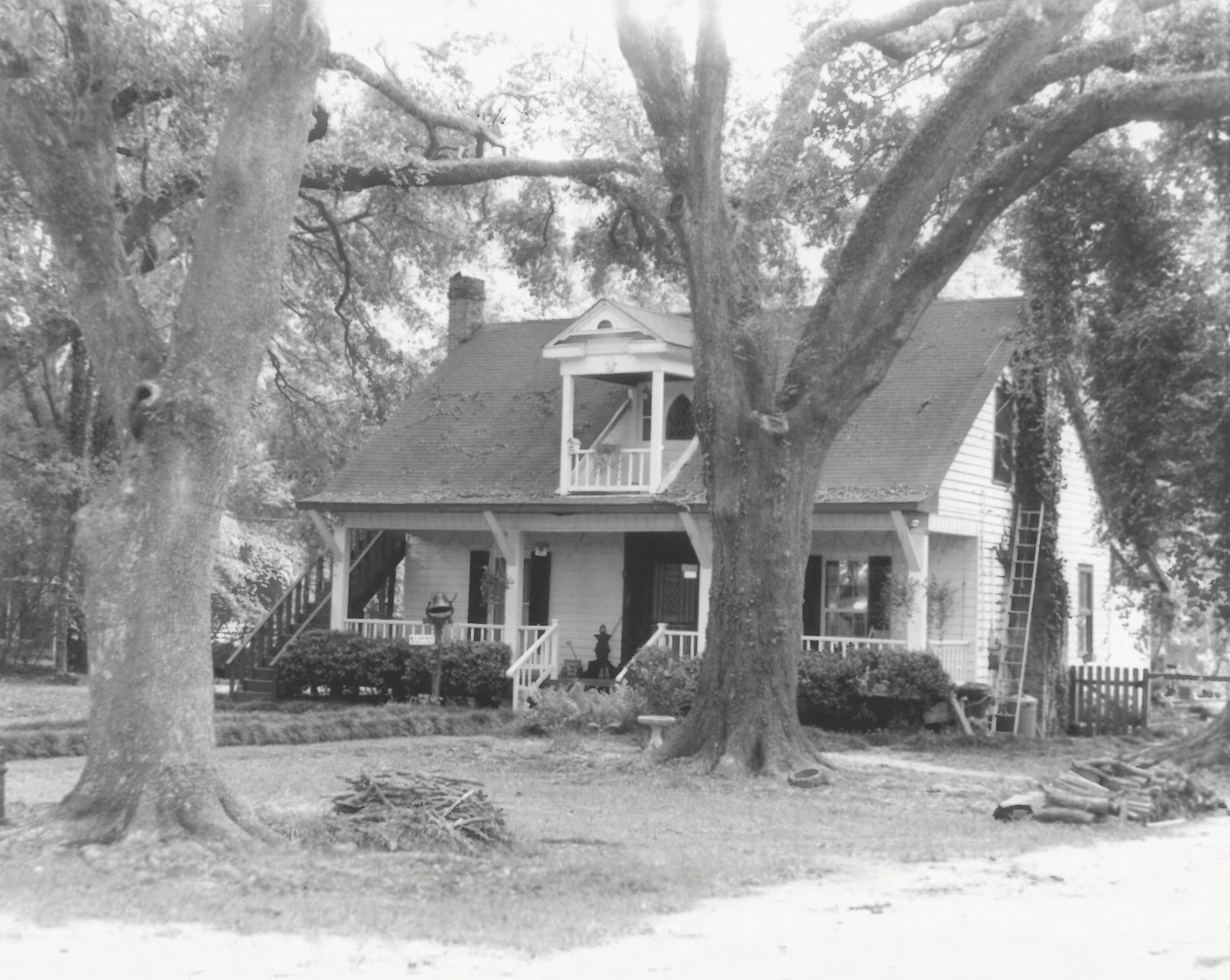

- Location within Louisiana
- Location: 38127 LA 42, Prairieville, Louisiana
- Coordinates: 30°19′11″N 90°58′17″W
- Area: 1.6 acres (0.65 ha)
- Built: 1850
- NRHP reference No.: 99000634
- Added to NRHP: May 27, 1999

The Dixon House, also known as the Moore House, is a historic Greek Revival cottage in Prairieville, Louisiana that was built in 1850.

== Background ==
The property was sold to Michael Dixon in 1865 by Paris Moore and was used as a cotton mill and subsequently a sugar mill. The house was listed on the National Register of Historic Places on May 27, 1999.

== See also ==
- National Register of Historic Places listings in Ascension Parish, Louisiana
