= Hermitage Plantation =

Hermitage Plantation may refer to:

- Hermitage (Darrow, Louisiana) in Darrow, Ascension Parish, Louisiana, U.S.
- The Hermitage (Nashville, Tennessee), home of Andrew Jackson in Nashville, Tennessee, U.S.
- Hermitage Plantation (Georgia), U.S.
- Hermitage Plantation in St. Bernard Parish, Louisiana, U.S.
- Hermitage Plantation in St. Charles Parish, Louisiana, U.S.
- Hermitage Plantation in Claiborne County, Mississippi, U.S.
- L'Hermitage Slave Village Archeological Site on the grounds of the former l'Hermitage Plantation near Frederick, Maryland, U.S.
