= Mulberry Grove (Donaldsonville, Louisiana) =

Historic house in Louisiana, United States

- U.S. National Register of Historic Places
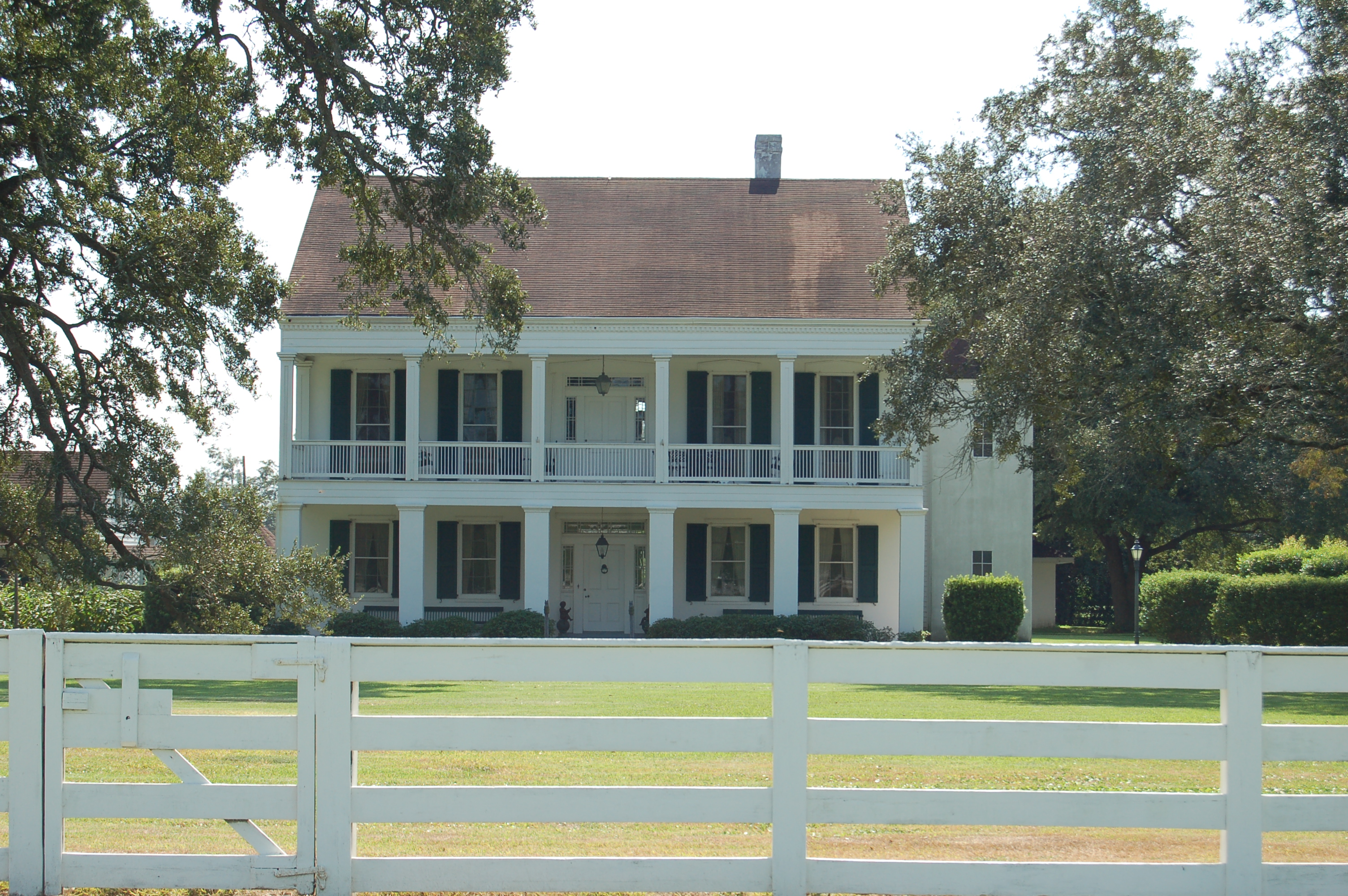

- Location within Louisiana
- Location: Along Louisiana Highway 405, about 7 miles (11 km) northeast of White Castle
- Nearest city: White Castle, Louisiana
- Coordinates: 30°11′29″N 91°02′06″W
- Area: 3 acres (1.2 ha)
- Built: 1836
- Architectural style: Greek Revival, French Creole
- NRHP reference No.: 93001118
- Added to NRHP: October 14, 1993

Mulberry Grove is a historic mansion in Donaldsonville, Louisiana, U.S.. It was designed in the Greek Revival architectural style, and it was built in 1836 for Dr Duffel.

It was subsequently purchased by German-born John B. Reuss, who made it part of his Germania Plantation. Reuss's daughter, who inherited the Mulberry Grove part of Germania Plantation, sold it to Mrs C. C. Clifton in 1951. In the late 1980s, Mrs. Clifton sold the plantation house, after a restoration work, to Lawrence J. Noel III & Allen T. Noel.

The mansion, along with a water cistern and four quarters houses located shortly to the east, have been listed on the National Register of Historic Places on October 14, 1993.

== See also ==
- National Register of Historic Places listings in Ascension Parish, Louisiana
