= Hermitage Academy =

Hermitage Academy may refer to:

- Hermitage Academy, Chester-le-Street, a secondary school in County Durham, England
- Hermitage Academy, Helensburgh, a secondary school in Argyll and Bute, Scotland

== See also ==
- Hermitage (disambiguation)
