= Bocage Plantation =

Historic house in Louisiana, United States

- U.S. National Register of Historic Places
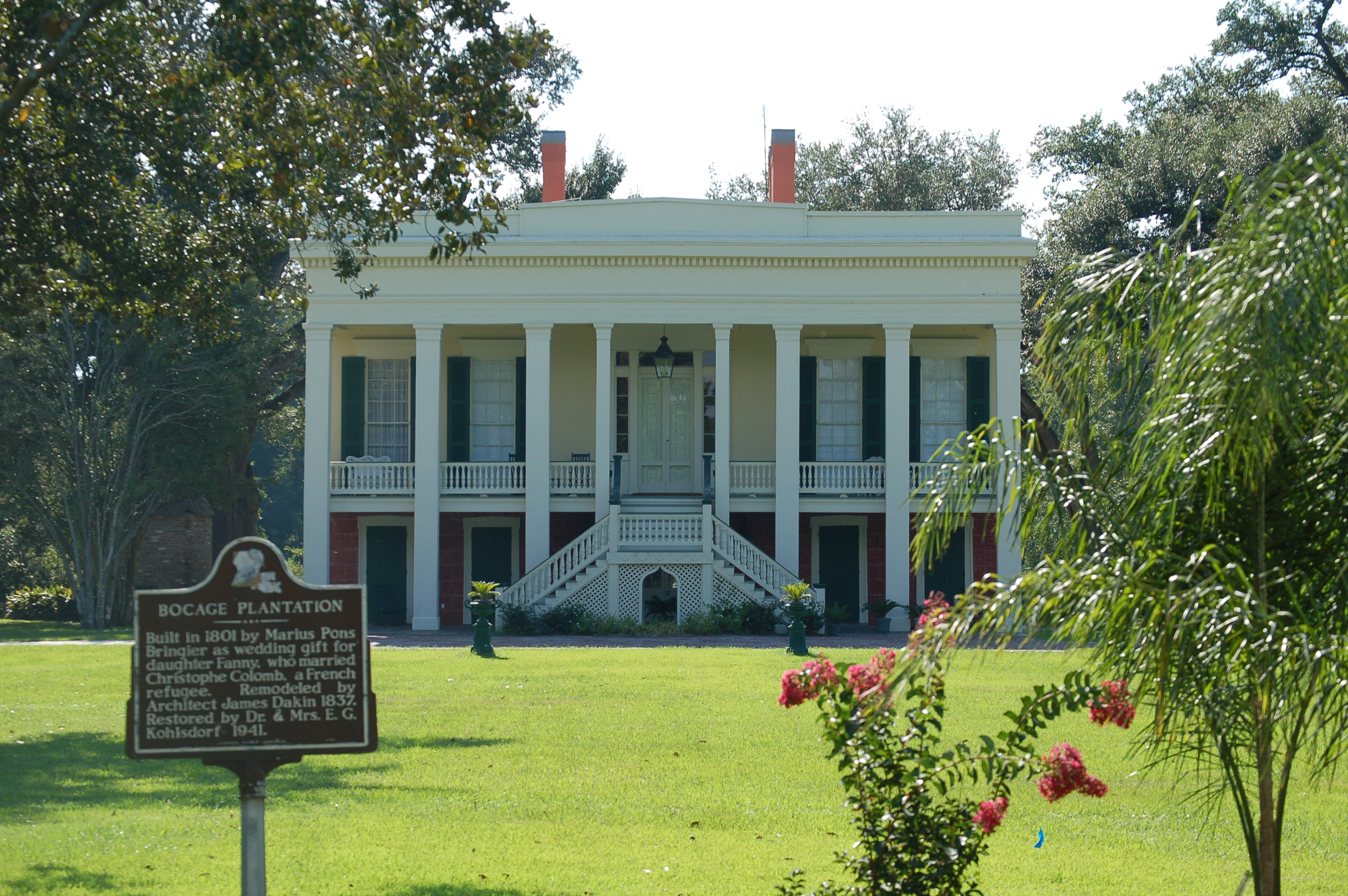
- Plantation House

- Location within Louisiana Location within the United States
- Location: On River Road, about 100 yards (91 m) north of intersection with St. Elmo Street
- Nearest city: Darrow, Louisiana
- Coordinates: 30°07′25″N 90°57′19″W
- Area: 3.5 acres (1.4 ha) (Note: The whole plantation area of 110 acres (45 ha) was not included in the historic listing. See)
- Built: 1801, 1837
- Architect: Attributed to James H. Dakin or Henry Howard Brantley, Robert S. Henry Howard Louisiana's Architect. pp. 68–72.
- Architectural style: Greek Revival, French Creole
- NRHP reference No.: 91000705
- Added to NRHP: June 20, 1991

Bocage Plantation is a historic plantation in Darrow, Ascension Parish, Louisiana, about 25 miles (40 km) southeast of Baton Rouge. The plantation house was constructed in 1837 in Greek Revival style with Creole influences, especially in the floorplan. Established in 1801, the plantation was added to the National Register of Historic Places on June 20, 1991.

== History ==
Bocage Plantation was established in January 1801, five years after Étienne de Boré proved that sugarcane cultivation could be profitable in southern Louisiana and two years before the Louisiana Purchase. It was a wedding gift from St. James Parish planter Marius Pons Bringier to his eldest daughter, 14-year-old Francoise "Fanny" Bringier, on the occasion of her marriage to 34-year-old Parisian bon vivant Christophe Colomb.

The original house, built in 1801 and destroyed by fire in or before 1837, was a "raised Creole house—brick on the first floor supporting a heavy-timber frame above". At first, it was thought that this house was at the same site as, and the basis for, the current house, until, "during the process [of the 2008 restoration], the bases of four symmetrically placed chimneys[,] surrounded by charred remains and fragments of brick and broken glass (the glass dating to 1800), were discovered buried about 40 feet behind the [current] house." Another fact confirming this is that there are two huge live oaks that exist behind the present day Bocage. During the period of time when live oaks were planted in a row, there was no levee, so they front entrance to Bocage would have been the Mississippi River, or an adjacent dirt road to the levee. During that time, there was no predilection to plant live oaks in the back corners of the house, however there are two live oaks behind the present-day structure, which would be to the front of the Creole Cottage built in 1801.

Although sources vary as to the certainty of it, the design of the current, 1837, house has been attributed to James H. Dakin, who came to Louisiana in 1835, was employed by the Bringier family, and was skilled in Greek Revival architecture. Distinctive features of the façade include the massive entablature, with pediment design on the parapet and denticulated cornice, supported across the entire front by square, giant order columns forming a double gallery. The front staircase did not always exist. It was re-added during the 2008 restoration, based on the oldest known picture/watercolor painting of Bocage done at the beginning of the 20th century. The upper gallery was used to film a scene in the movie "Twelve Years a Slave". The upper gallery opens into a large double parlor on the premier étage, where rooms open into each other, without halls, in the Creole style, with a cabinet-loggia at the rear. Giant 12-foot-tall sliding doors separate the upper parlors when closed. The roof once served as a rainwater catch basin, with the fresh water shunted through pipes to a cistern on each side, in back of the house.

After many years of neglect, the house was salvaged in 1941 by Drs. E. G. Kohlsdorf and Anita Crozat (Mrs. Kohlsdorf). An auction in 2007 sold various furnishings from the house and grounds.

From January-December 2008 the house, purchased and restored by Dr. Marion Rundell, became a B&B that also offered public tours. During his restoration of the house, Dr. Rundell hired the help of Adrian Trevino, who Dr. Rundell regarded as "A dedicated and intelligent man when it comes to restoring a house", to unravel the history of Bocage. . He also worked with Dr. Neil Odenwald, the director of LSU Robert Reich School of Landscape Architecture, to choose the plants in Bocage, which included azaleas, live oaks, and crape myrtles, all planted by Dr. Rundell, with associates Adrian Trevino, and Luba and Igor Detsyk.

In 2015, Dr. Rundell permanently closed Bocage Plantation to spend more time with family.

== Geography ==
Bocage Plantation is located on Louisiana Highway 942, along the River Road, in Darrow, Ascension Parish, on the east bank of the Mississippi River, but on a meander that puts it north and west of the river. The plantation is across the river from the parish seat of Donaldsonville, and about 25 miles southeast of Baton Rouge.

== Filming location ==
Bocage Plantation was used as a setting in the 1974 film The Autobiography of Ms. Jane Pittman

Bocage Plantation was used as a setting for "Shaw Farm" in the 2013 film 12 Years a Slave.

== See also ==
- National Register of Historic Places listings in Ascension Parish, Louisiana
