= Robert Penn Warren House =

Historic house in Louisiana, United States

- U.S. National Register of Historic Places
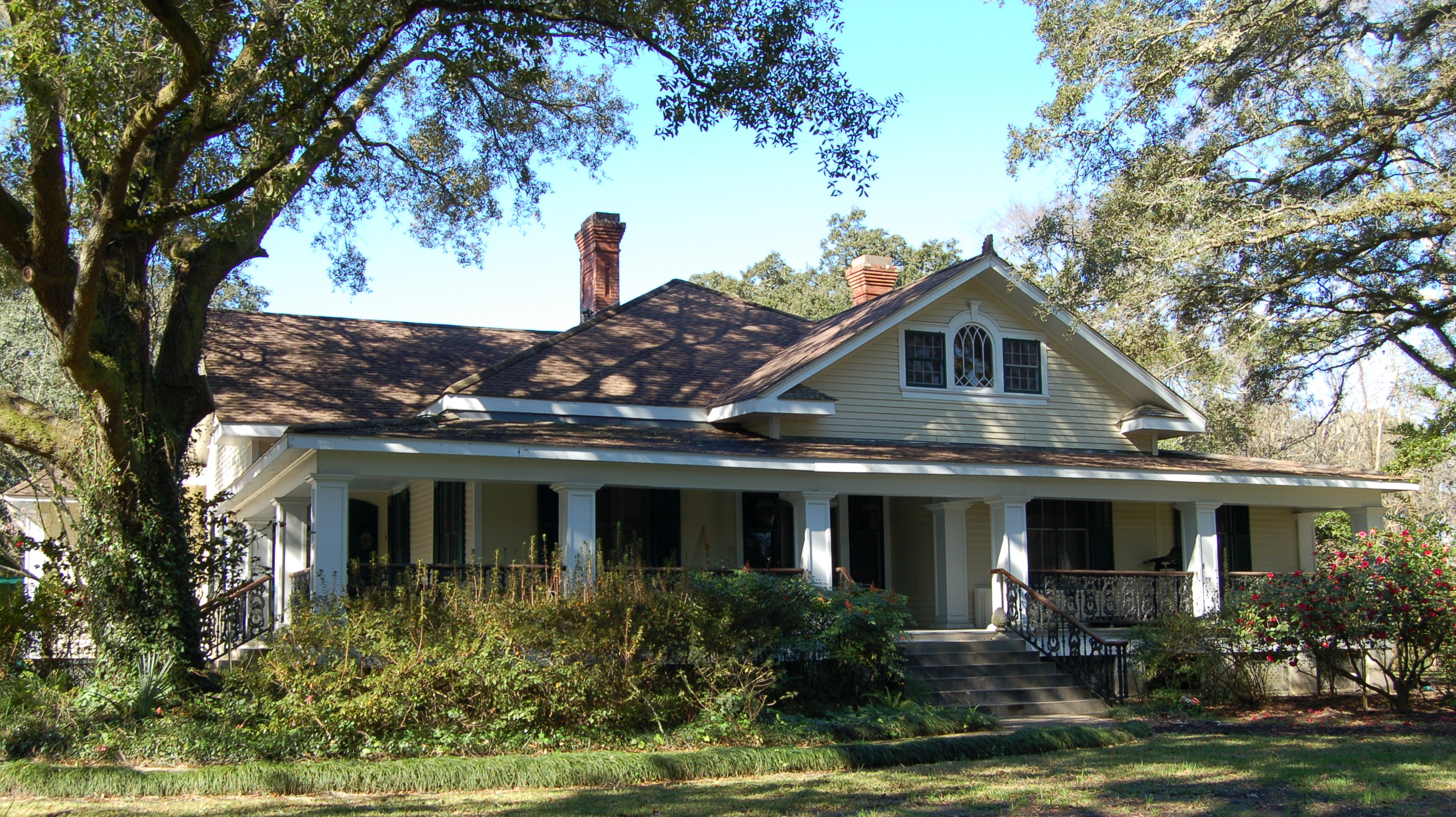

- Location within Louisiana
- Location: 16381 Old Jefferson Highway, Prairieville, Louisiana
- Coordinates: 30°18′30″N 90°58′25″W
- Area: 7 acres (2.8 ha)
- Built: c.1905
- Architectural style: Colonial Revival
- NRHP reference No.: 92001732
- Added to NRHP: January 7, 1993

The Robert Penn Warren House, also known as Twin Oaks, is a historic house in Prairieville, Louisiana, U.S.. It was designed in the Colonial Revival architectural style, and it was built in c. 1905.

It was the private residence of author Robert Penn Warren from 1941, when he bought the house, to 1942. During this period, the house received several alterations from its original plan.

The house has been listed on the National Register of Historic Places on January 7, 1993.

== See also ==
- National Register of Historic Places listings in Ascension Parish, Louisiana
