= Palo Alto Plantation (Donaldsonville, Louisiana) =

Historic house in Louisiana, United States

- U.S. National Register of Historic Places
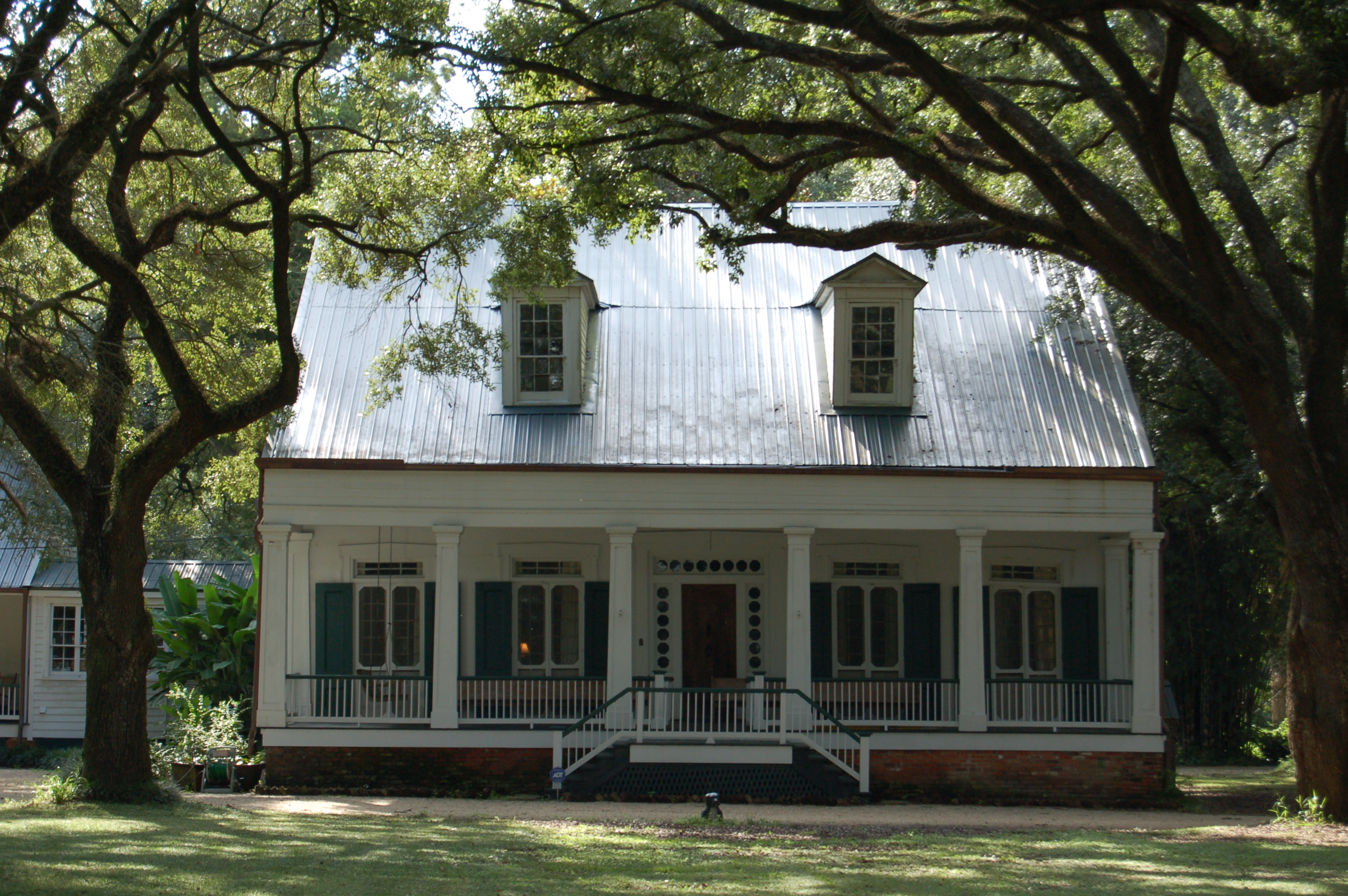

- Location within Louisiana Location within the United States
- Location: Northwest of the junction of Louisiana Highway 1 with Louisiana Highway 944
- Nearest city: Donaldsonville, Louisiana
- Coordinates: 30°05′27″N 91°01′48″W
- Area: 7 acres (2.8 ha)
- Built: c. 1847
- Architectural style: Greek Revival, Carpenter Greek Revival
- NRHP reference No.: 77000665
- Added to NRHP: April 13, 1977

Palo Alto Plantation is an historic mansion located at the corner of LA-1 and LA-944, along Bayou Lafourche in Donaldsonville in Ascension Parish, Louisiana. It was built in c.1847 and was added to the National Register of Historic Places on April 13, 1977. The architecture is an Anglo-Creole type Louisiana plantation cottage decorated in Greek Revival style.

== History ==
The first recorded owners of the plantation were Pierre Oscar Ayraud and his wife, Rosalie Rodriguez, who acquired the house from succession of Rosalie's father, Mathias Rodriguez, in 1852. The house is thought to be designed by architect, James Dakin based on its style.

This house was subject to multiple painting by French-born artist, Marie Adrien Persac (1823–1873).

The plantation house is a 1 1/2-story building on brick piers with a twelve-foot-wide porch set under the roof line. The window panes of the house are more than 170 years old and contain etchings with names and initials, and it is said to be how the family would check if their engagement diamond rings were real. The doorknobs are lower than a modern home, because the average height of people was shorter.

In 1860, the Lemann family purchased the home, and as of 2019 it is still owned by the family and used as a bed and breakfast and for events.

== See also ==
- National Register of Historic Places listings in Ascension Parish, Louisiana
- Palo Alto Plantation House architecture drawings (1933) at Library of Congress
