= Helvetia Dependency =

- U.S. National Register of Historic Places
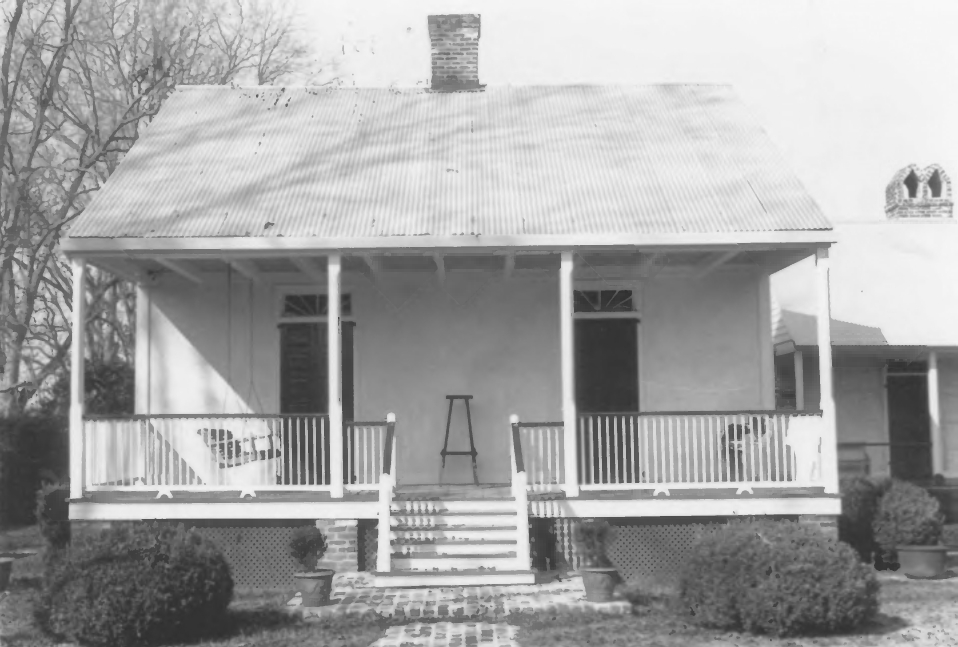

- Location within Louisiana
- Nearest city: Darrow, Louisiana
- Coordinates: 30°07′02″N 90°57′44″W
- Area: 0.6 acres (0.24 ha)
- Built: 1820
- Architectural style: Federal, French Creole
- MPS: Louisiana's French Creole Architecture MPS
- NRHP reference No.: 92000570
- Added to NRHP: June 4, 1992

The Helvetia Dependency is a historic pre-Civil War French Creole house in Darrow, Louisiana that was built in 1820.

== Background ==
The house was originally a raised two-story house in St. James Parish and was later moved to Ascension Parish and is currently one story. The house was listed on the National Register of Historic Places on June 4, 1992.

== See also ==
- National Register of Historic Places listings in Ascension Parish, Louisiana
