= Tezcuco (Burnside, Louisiana) =

Historic house in Louisiana, United States

- Formerly listed on the U.S. National Register of Historic Places
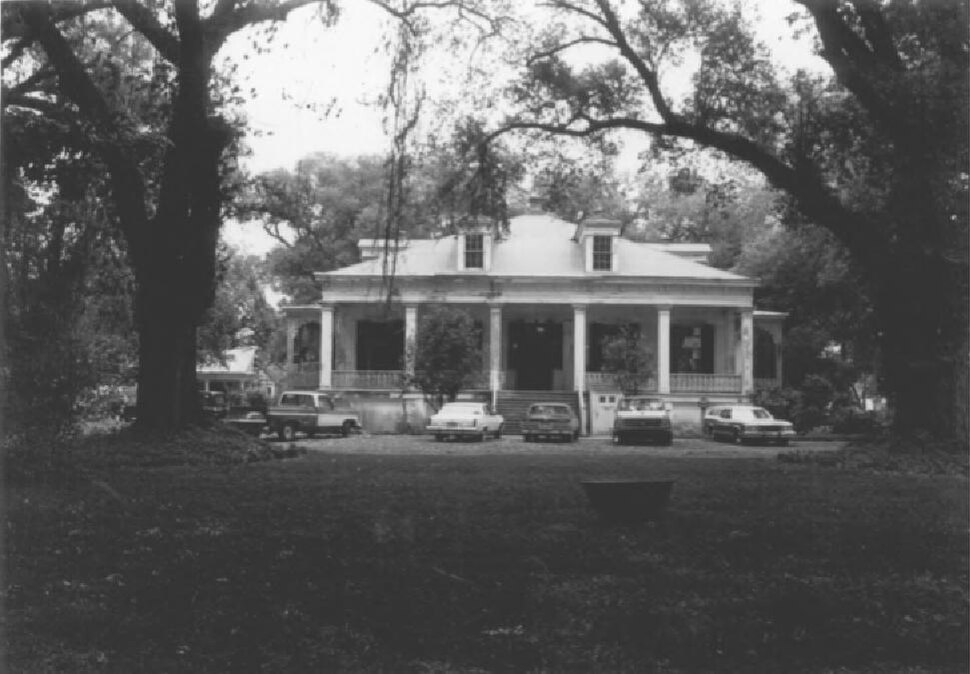
- Tezcuco front facade in June 1982

- Location within Louisiana
- Location: Along Louisiana Highway 44, about 1.7 miles (2.7 km) southeast of Burnside
- Nearest city: Burnside, Louisiana
- Coordinates: 30°06′56″N 90°54′37″W
- Area: 0.9 acres (0.36 ha)
- Built: c. 1855; 171 years ago
- Architectural style: Greek Revival
- NRHP reference No.: 83000485

Significant dates
- Added to NRHP: March 3, 1983
- Removed from NRHP: January 31, 2019

Tezcuco is a former plantation in Burnside, Louisiana, U.S.. It was built c. 1855 for Benjamin Tureaud, and designed in the Greek Revival architectural style. The plantation remained in the Bringier-Tureaud family until 1950, when it was purchased by Dr. and Mrs. Robert H. Potts. In 1982, the owner prior to the fire, Annette Harland, obtained the land from the Potts Family and turned the plantation into a bed and breakfast in 1983.

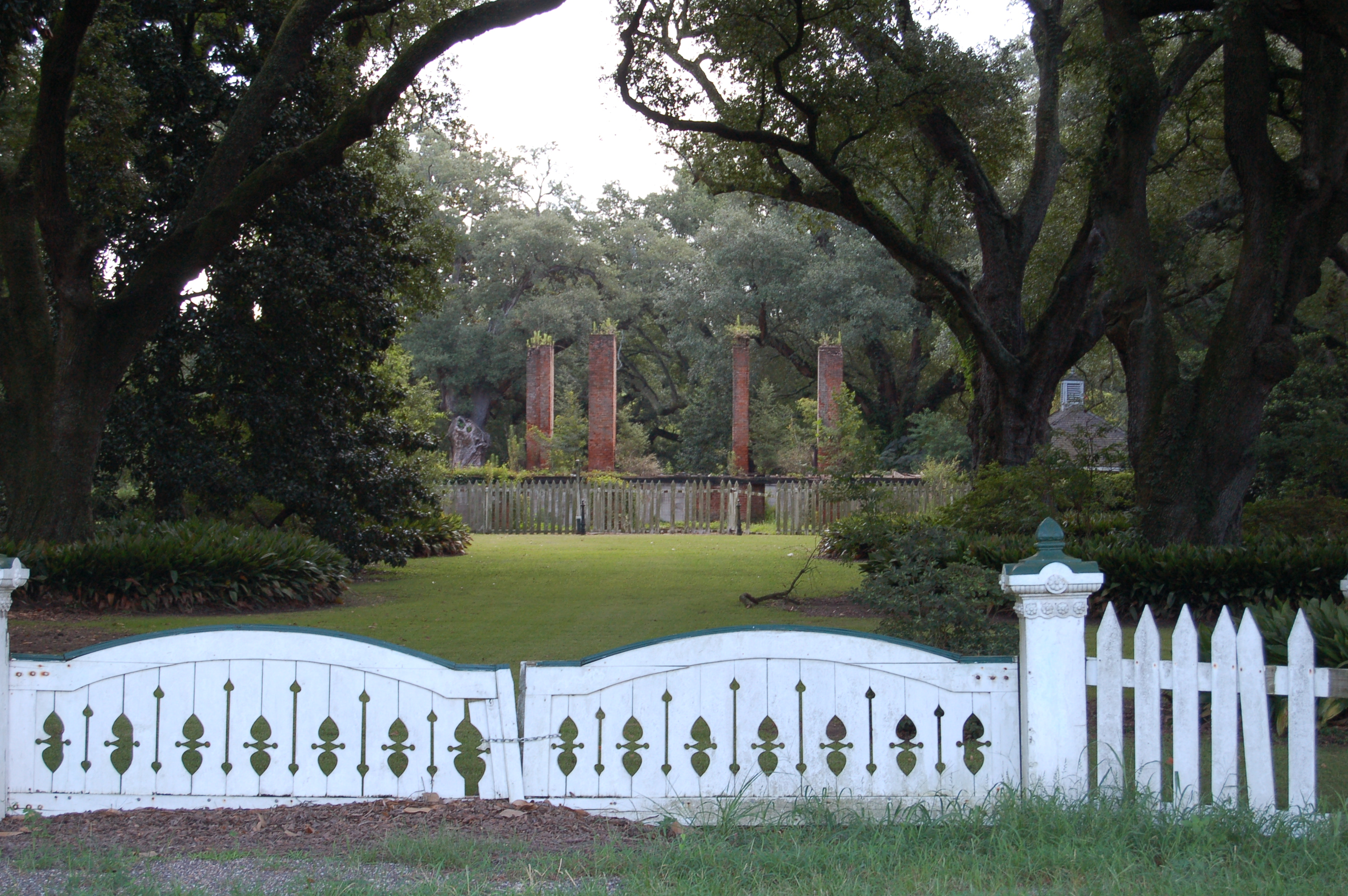
View towards the ruins in 2015

The house was listed on the National Register of Historic Places on March 3, 1983, and was delisted on January 31, 2019.

It burned down in May 2002. The cause of the fire is undetermined. Ruins of the fireplaces are still visible.

== See also ==
- National Register of Historic Places listings in Ascension Parish, Louisiana
