= Kenner and Henderson =

Slavery bank in Louisiana

Kenner and Henderson was a cotton and slave brokerage and financial clearing house based in New Orleans, Louisiana. The principals were William Kenner and Stephen Henderson, and Kenner and Henderson was an elite company that served an elite clientele and was one of the most prosperous organizations in New Orleans before the War of 1812. Kenner was a Virginian by birth. Their clients included planters like Kenner's father-in-law, Stephen Minor of Natchez.

Kenner and Henderson ordered all manner of supplies for their planter clients, including slaves from the Chesapeake Bay area. During the 1828 U.S. presidential election, opponents of Andrew Jackson seeking to publicize his background as a slave trader published pamphlets describing slave-trading deals allegedly made by Jackson. One such instance allegedly involving Kenner and Henderson was described by Andrew Erwin: "Nor is it necessary to dwell upon a dispute between yourself and Epperson, which was referred ·to the arbitration of Judge Haywood and Judge Overton, respecting a negro fellow you bought for the express purpose of selling to Kenner and Henderson at New Orleans, expecting to obtain for him the enormous sum of $2,000, provided you could procure the certificate of D. Moore, and others, as to his being a good blacksmith."

In 1806 the company announced the sale of "74 prime slaves of the Fantee nation on board the schooner Reliance...from Charleston." Slaves from a sugar plantation owned by Kenner and Henderson were involved in the 1811 German Coast uprising. The Kenner and Henderson partnership was dissolved in 1811.

== See also ==
- Duncan F. Kenner
- Joseph Erwin § Slave trading
