= Hermitage Island =

Island in Mauritius

Coordinates: 19°45′S 63°26′E

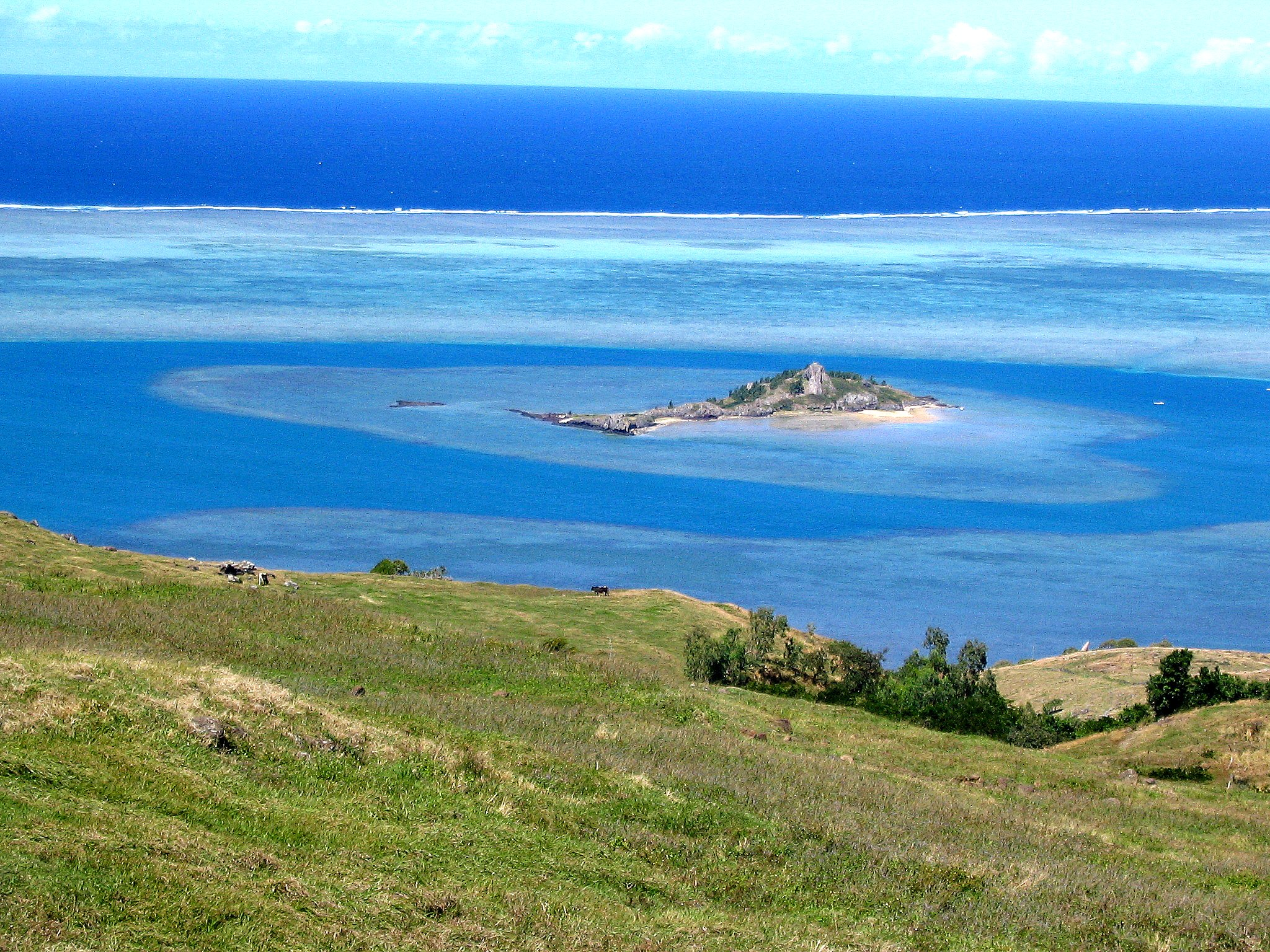
View of the Hermitage island in Rodrigues

Hermitage Island (French: Île Hermitage) is a small island lying south west of Port Sud-Est in Rodrigues, Mauritius. It is reputed to be the location of buried treasure and is a popular destination for tourists.
