= USS Hermitage =

USS Hermitage may refer to:

- USS Hermitage (AP-54), a troop transport launched in 1925 as the Italian liner SS Conte Biancamano; interned, renamed, and commissioned in U.S. Navy, 1942; returned to Italy in 1947.
- USS Hermitage (LSD-34), a Thomaston-class dock landing ship launched in 1956; transferred to Brazilian Navy as Ceará (C-30) in 1989
