= Hermitage School District =

Hermitage School District may refer to:

- Hermitage School District (Arkansas)
- Hermitage School District (Pennsylvania)
