= The Hermitage (La Plata, Maryland) =

Historic house in Maryland, United States

- U.S. National Register of Historic Places
- Location within Maryland Location within the United States
- Location: Washington Ave., La Plata, Maryland
- Coordinates: 38°32′2″N 76°58′52″W
- Area: 22.3 acres (9.0 ha)
- Architectural style: Federal
- NRHP reference No.: 98000886
- Added to NRHP: July 23, 1998

The Hermitage is a historic home located at La Plata, Charles County, Maryland, United States. It is a two-story, three bay frame dwelling with a dormered gable roof. The home was built about 1847 in the Federal style, and has a pair of brick, exterior chimneys at one end and a deep wraparound veranda on Tuscan columns. It was built by Major George W. Matthews, a farmer and attorney, whose descendants, beginning in 1870 and continuing through the 1940s, promoted the founding and development of La Plata and the relocation of the seat of Charles County government there from Port Tobacco.

The Hermitage was listed on the National Register of Historic Places in 1998.
