= Burnside, Louisiana =

Unincorporated community in Louisiana, U.S.

Coordinates: 30°08′N 90°55′W

Burnside is an unincorporated community in Ascension Parish, Louisiana, United States. It was founded by French and German settlers in 1726, early in the French colonial period. The ZIP Code for Burnside is 70738.

The community's name is for John Burnside, an Irish American who owned The Houmas sugar plantation from 1857 until his death in 1881. In 1860, Burnside owned more than 800 slaves according to the 1860 Louisiana Slave census of the US government.

There are three local sites which have been listed on the National Register of Historic Places at one time or another: The Houmas plantation, Tezcuco plantation, and St. Joseph's School.

== See also ==
- National Register of Historic Places listings in Ascension Parish, Louisiana
