= William Kenner =

American businessman (1774–1824)

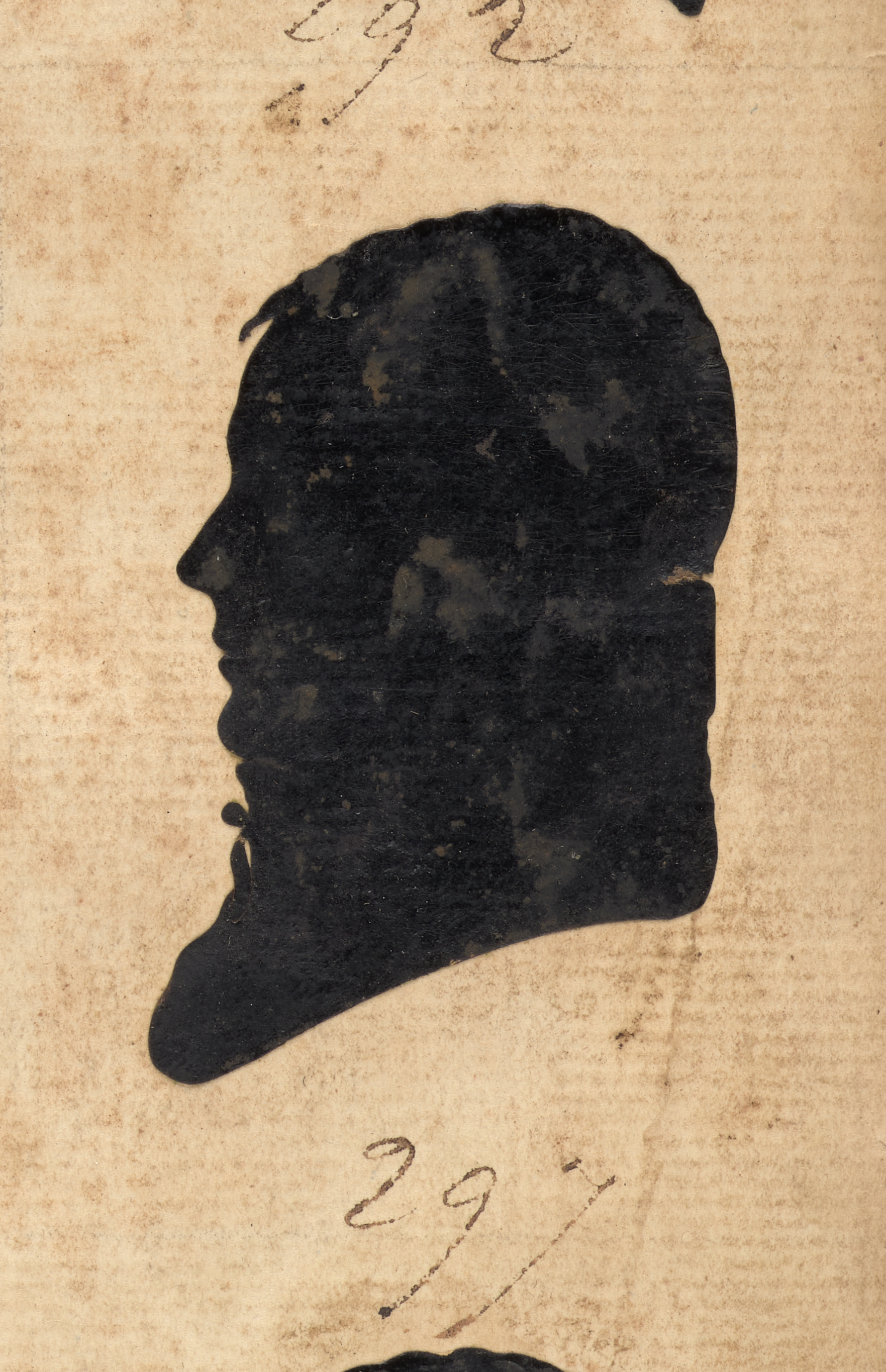
- Silhouette of William Butler Kenner Sr. from ledger book of William Bache (Smithsonian National Portrait Gallery object S/NPG.2002.184.312)
- Born: June 4, 1774; Virginia
- Died: May 10, 1824 (aged 49); New Orleans, Louisiana, United States
- Occupations: Slave trader, sugar planter, cotton factor

William Kenner (June 4, 1774 – May 10, 1824) was an American shipping magnate, slave trader, and cotton broker in territorial Mississippi and New Orleans, Louisiana in the United States. He also owned large sugar plantations along the Mississippi River that were worked by an enslaved labor force. Kenner is remembered as an "influential spokesman for the mercantile community throughout the region."

== Biography ==
Born on June 4, 1774, in Caroline County, Virginia, William Kenner settled in the Natchez District in the 1790s. (Note: Some sources suggest his birth year was 1776; this article sources the 1774 birth year from the Dictionary of Louisiana Biography.) He was named a "justice of the peace and quorum" of Adams County, Mississippi Territory in 1797. In 1801, Kenner sold 550 acres on Sandy Creek to Abijah Hunt. In November 1801, planter and merchant Ebenezer Rees sold Kenner a 764-acre property in Adams County for $3,000. Kenner and his young wife lived on Royal Street after their 1801 wedding, and Kenner had his office on Chartres Street. In 1804 Kenner was also appointed to the territorial council for Orleans by Thomas Jefferson.

Kenner became partners with an immigrant from Scotland named Stephen Henderson in a mercantile company known as Kenner and Henderson. Kenner and Henderson owned sugar plantations and imported slaves via Charleston, South Carolina. In 1805 he was on the board of United States Bank, Philadelphia. He was a broker for cotton produced by the labor of his father-in-law's slaves. (In 1819 he wrote client John Minor that East India cotton, which was currently at maximum production and flooding the market, was preferred by Liverpool buyers to Mississippi cotton, which would depress cotton prices for the time being.) In 1810, Kenner sold Abijah Hunt another 118 acres adjoining the territorial capital of Washington in Mississippi.

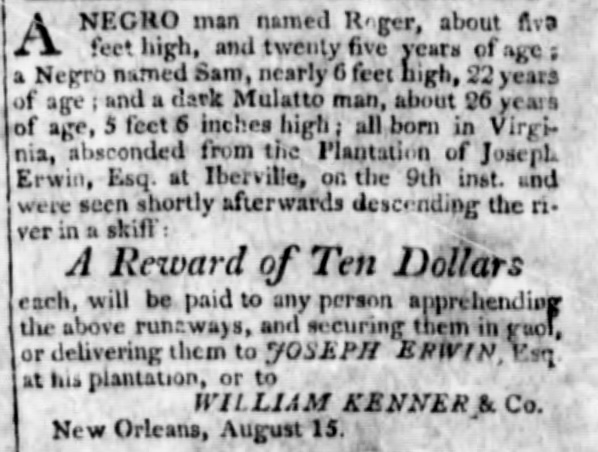
On behalf of Louisiana sugar planter Joseph Erwin, William Kenner's company placed a runaway slave seeking the capture of Roger, Sam, and a 'dark mulatto man,' all born in Virginia (Louisiana Gazette, October 24, 1812)

Slaves from a sugar plantation owned by Kenner and Henderson were involved in the 1811 German Coast uprising. The Kenner & Henderson partnership dissolved in 1811. In 1812 the first steamboat to ever arrive in New Orleans contained a consignment for Kenner. After Kenner and Henderson parted ways, Kenner started William Kenner & Co. with Richard Clague, later joined by John Oldham. One of his plantations was called Somerset. He owned sugar plantations called Oakland and Linwood. Theophilus Minor was part owner of Linwood Plantation in Ascension Parish. Kenner also owned part and then all of a riverfront plantation at Cannes Brûlées (meaning burnt cane, describing the many canebrakes in the Lower Mississippi). Oakwood in Jefferson Parish seems to have been the "home" plantation as his wife kept her flower garden there. Oakwood was also home to 63 enslaved people, eight of whom were house servants. There were 148 enslaved people attached to Linwood.

As of April 1815, William Kenner & Co. sold sugar, flour, saltpeter, gunpowder, cotton cards, cotton bagging, bale rope, sewing twine, porcelain dinnerware, weeding hoes, and "8 casks fine strained spermecita oil." At the end of year Kenner announced that the "staunch brig" Archimedes was sailing for New York and would accept passengers or freight by application to the ship's master. During the summer of 1816 he has 2500 gallons of whiskey for sale. In 1817 he posted notice in the newspaper that Ruth & Mary, and Isabella, would both be sailing soon for Philadelphia. In 1819 he was involved in an interstate slave trade between Abner Robinson of Baltimore and Joseph Erwin of Iberville Parish. In 1820, William Kenner offered for sale sugar, molasses, cheese, and "prime beef." In 1821 a newspaper ad announced "WANTED FOR CHARLESTON...vessel to carry 180 Hhds sugar," and that from Liverpool on the ship Otho had arrived 605 sacks of salt, along with another 130 tons loose salt.

Old Families of Louisiana, published in 1831, over 100 years after the fact, states, "About the year 1820 reverses came to the hitherto wealthy merchant, and his prosperity began to decline. His partner, Oldham, in whom he reposed the greatest confidence, absconded with a large part of the partnership's assets, and obligations falling due that could not be met, bankruptcy was the consequence." During this period, Kenner may have also served as cotton factor for former Mississippi Territorial governor Winthrop Sargeant. Kenner died at his Royal Street home in New Orleans on May 10, 1824. He left an estate valued at US$277,288 (equivalent to $8,129,580 in 2025).

Clague and Oldham "apparently continued [William Kenner & Co.] in operation for several years under Clague's management."

== Personal life ==
In November 1801, he married Mary Minor, daughter of wealthy local planter Stephen Minor. Stephen Minor, sometimes called Estevan Minor in documents, had been the last Spanish governor of Natchez. Mary Minor was 14 years old at the time of the wedding, and Kenner was 24. They moved to New Orleans shortly after the wedding.

He had four sons who survived to adulthood Philip Minor Kenner, William Butler Kenner, George Rappele Kenner, and Duncan Farrar Kenner; some of their plantation land later became the town of Kenner, Louisiana. His daughter Frances Ann Kenner married New Orleans-based federal judge John Dick in 1823 but Judge Dick died of consumption in 1824. Frances remarried George Currie Duncan "of Liverpool" in 1825; they lived in New Orleans, he died in 1870, and she died in 1875.

== Historiography ==
The Special Collections department of Louisiana State University Library holds William Kenner's papers. The New Orleans city archive has a William Kenner & Co. letterbook with business correspondence from 1822 to 1823. Portraits of William Kenner and Mary Minor Kenner were donated to the city of Kenner, Louisiana by descendant Minor Kenner Jr. in 1955, on the occasion of the city centennial. The portrait of William Kenner was attributed to Gilbert Stuart; the portrait of Mary Minor Kenner was painted by Jose deSalazar. The paintings were restored and unveiled at Kenner City Hall in 1958.

== Sources ==
- Arthur, Stanley C.; Kernion, George Campbell Huchet de (1977) [1931]. Old Families of Louisiana. Louisiana Classics Series Vol. 7. Baton Rouge: Claitor's Publishing Division. FHL 2351576.
- Bauer, Craig A. (Autumn 1982). "From Burnt Canes to Budding City: A History of the City of Kenner, Louisiana". Louisiana History: The Journal of the Louisiana Historical Association. 23 (4): 353–381. ISSN 0024-6816. JSTOR 4232211.
- David, Elbra Lilli (2018). Commodification, Slavery, Credit and the Law in the Lower Mississippi River Valley, 1780–1830 (Thesis). UC Irvine. ProQuest David_uci_0030D_15001.
- LSU Libraries (2007). "Inventory of the William Kenner Papers (Mss. 1477, 1491)" (PDF). Louisiana and Lower Mississippi Valley Collections. Baton Rouge, Louisiana. Archived from the original (PDF) on 2024-05-13.
- Rothman, Adam (2005). Slave Country: American Expansion and the Origins of the Deep South. Harvard University Press. doi:10.4159/9780674042919. ISBN 978-0-674-04291-9. LCCN 2004057658. OCLC 56191767.
- White, Alice Pemble (April 1944). "The Plantation Experience of Joseph and Lavinia Erwin, 1807–1836". Louisiana Historical Quarterly. XXVII (2). Cabildo, New Orleans: Louisiana Historical Society: 343–477. ISSN 0095-5949 – via Internet Archive.
