= The Hermitage (Tillery, North Carolina) =

Historic house in North Carolina, United States

- U.S. National Register of Historic Places
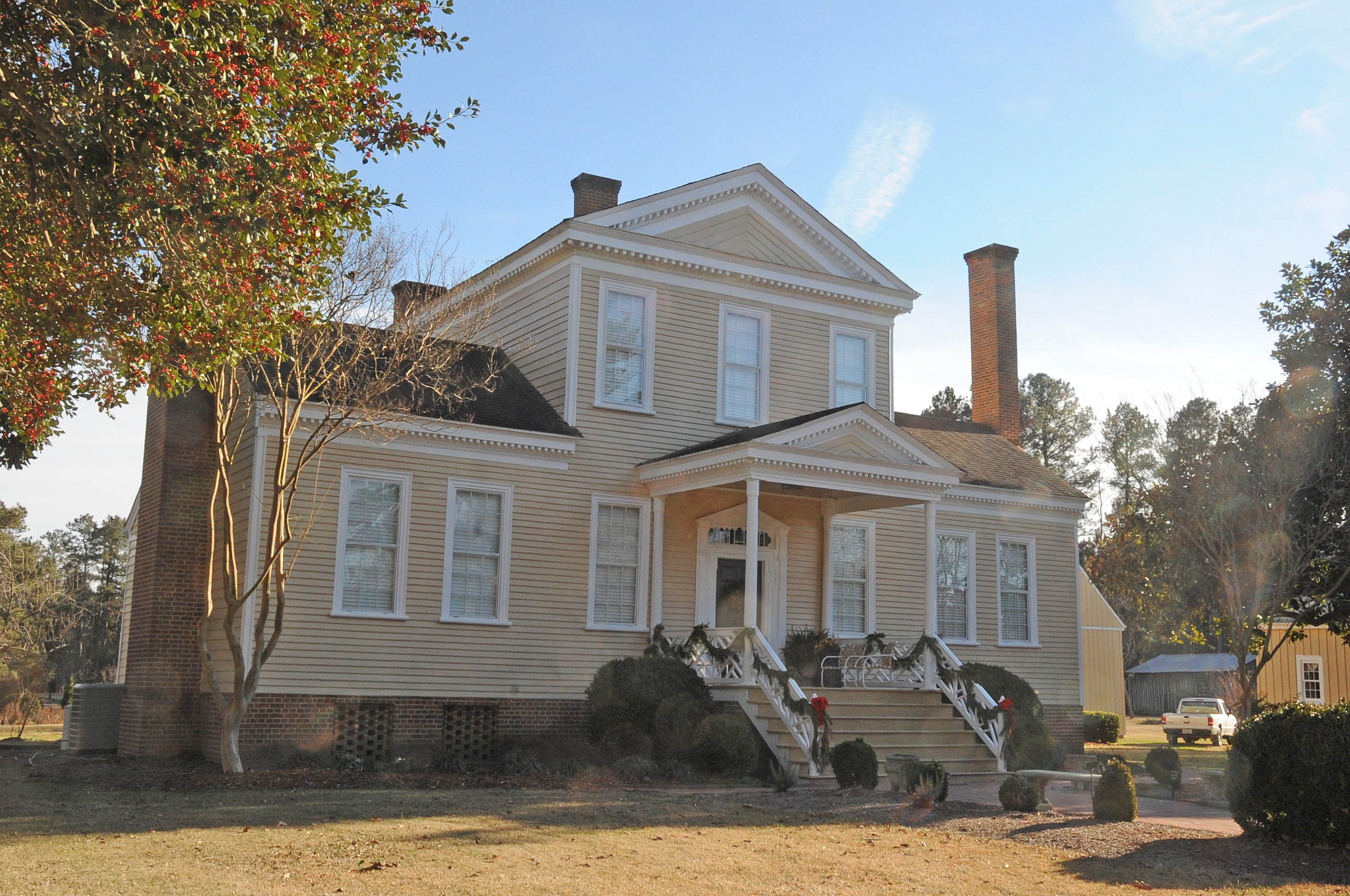

- Location within North Carolina Location within the United States
- Location: 1 mile (1.6 km) west of Tillery off NC 481, near Tillery, North Carolina
- Coordinates: 36°14′30″N 77°30′23″W
- Area: 20 acres (8.1 ha)
- Built: 1810
- NRHP reference No.: 75001274
- Added to NRHP: May 29, 1975

The Hermitage, also known as Tillery House, is a historic plantation house located near Tillery, Halifax County, North Carolina. It was built about 1810, and is a tripartite house that consists of a two-story, three-bay, pedimented central block flanked by one-story, two-bay, wings. An exterior end chimney rises at the end of each wing and at the rear of the very long central block.

It was listed on the National Register of Historic Places in 1975.
