= Eddie J. Lambert =

American attorney and politician

Member of the Louisiana Senate from the 18th district
- Incumbent
- Assumed office January 11, 2016
- Preceded by: Jody Amedee

Member of the Louisiana House of Representatives from the 59th district
- In office January 12, 2004 – January 11, 2016
- Preceded by: Juba Diez
- Succeeded by: Tony Bacala

Personal details
- Party: Republican
- Spouse: Marilyn
- Children: 3
- Education: Louisiana State University (BA, JD)
- Website: Campaign website

Eddie J. Lambert is an American attorney and politician from the state of Louisiana. A Republican, Lambert has represented the 18th district in the Louisiana State Senate since 2016. Lambert previously served in the Louisiana House of Representatives for the 59th district from 2003 until 2016.

Prior to serving in elected office, Lambert worked as an assistant district attorney from 1985 until 1990. He continues to work as a self-employed attorney in Gonzales.

Lambert was unopposed for re-election in 2019. He has not faced an opponent from either party since his first election in 2003.
