= Hermitage Arboretum =

Arboretum outside Nashville, Tennessee, United States

Coordinates: 36.2146°N 86.6129°W

The Hermitage Arboretum is an arboretum located on the grounds of The Hermitage, President Andrew Jackson's antebellum cotton plantation outside Nashville, Tennessee in the Hermitage neighborhood.

The arboretum lines the 1.5-mile (2.4 km) trail between the visitor center and the mansion, and contains labeled trees. Although the 1998 Nashville tornado outbreak destroyed many of the older trees on the grounds, several remaining trees may date from Jackson's lifetime.

In 2020, 100 more trees in the arboretum were felled or damaged by storms, including a sycamore and a black cherry tree that had stood for about a century.

== See also ==
- List of botanical gardens in the United States
