= Hermitage Municipal Theatre (Tula) =

Coordinates: 54.2189°N 37.6990°E

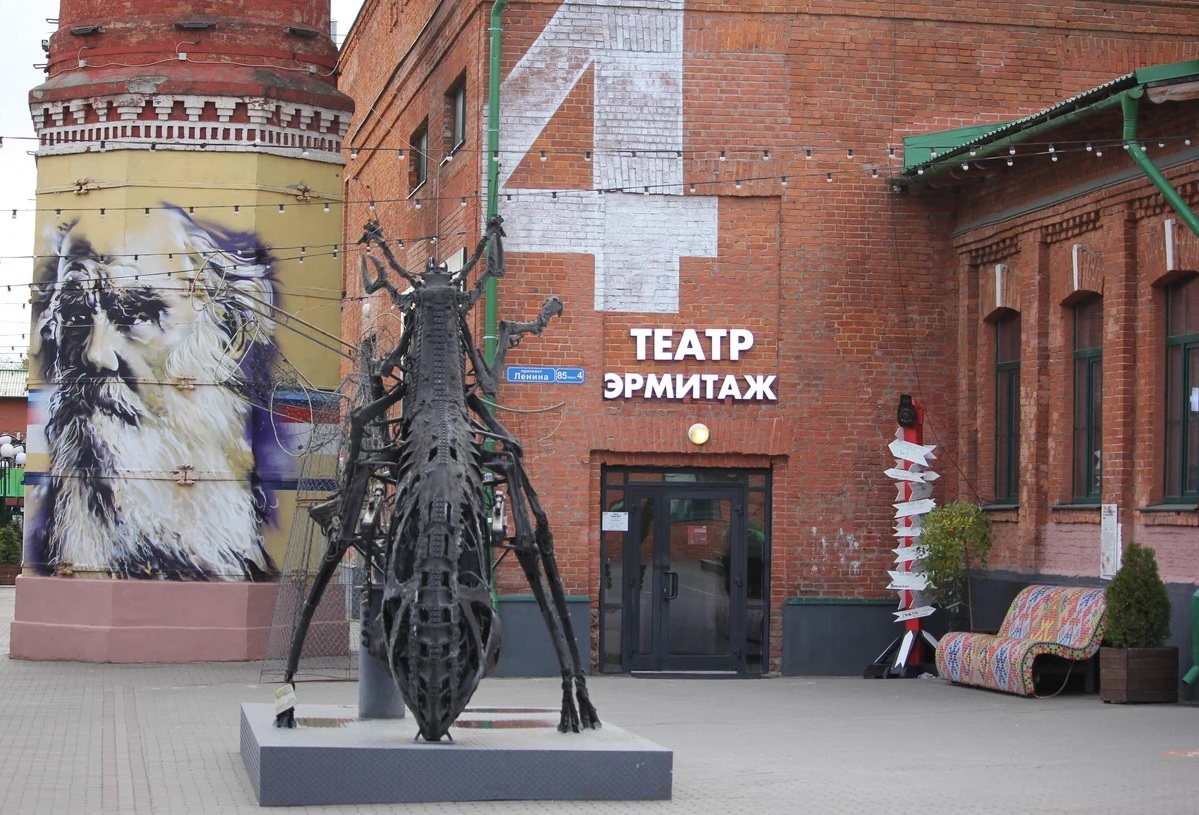
Tula Hermitage Theater

The Hermitage Municipal Theatre (Russian: Муниципальный театр «Эрмитаж») is the only Municipal Theatre in Tula, Russia.

== History and overview ==
The Hermitage Municipal Theatre was opened in 1972 under the name of "Near Tolstoy's Outpost", and it was not until 1992 that it was given its Municipal status. Until then it existed on a voluntary basis and was treated like an amateur studio. Spectators called it "Belov's Studio", after the name of its first leader Alexander Belov, whose outstanding personality and creativity made the theatre enormously famous among the citizens of Tula.

The 'Near Tolstoy's Outpost' theatre troop consisted mainly of young people, who acted in productions such as Shakespeare's Romeo and Juliet, and Rostand's Cyrano de Bergerac.

In 1998 the theatre faced dramatic changes. Its old building was lost in a fire, after which Belov left his post and many of the actors moved away from Tula to perform in the theatres of Moscow, Saint-Petersburg and Riga. In 2006 the theatre was granted a new building by the Culture Department of Tula. Though it is now situated far away from the city centre, numerous opening nights, festivals, events and other special occasions gather a wide audience.

In 2010 the theatre was renamed The Hermitage (from the French hermitage, a distant chapel) partly because of its far-away location. The Hermitage Municipal theatre is now reviving its fame by staging unusual plays and performances, including festivals and carnivals on the Tula city streets and central squares, as well as exhibitions, competitions and charitable shows for children and adults.

The Hermitage Municipal Theatre has toured in Novorossiysk, Ekaterinburg, Lipetsk, Saint Petersburg and Moscow.

== Special occasions and performances ==
- 'Theatre Patio' International Street Theatre Festival
- House concerts
- 'Pictures of Peace' art exhibition
- 'Silver Rain' music and dramatic performance
- 'Theatre in Your Life' photo contest
- 'Welcome to the Hermitage' Youth Theatre Festival
- 'The Theatre Goes to the City' Project
- Charitable New Year celebrations for children
- 'Granny's fairy-tales' performance
- Annual performances within Tula City Celebrations
