= Hermitage High School =

Hermitage High School may refer to:

- Hermitage High School (Arkansas) — Hermitage, Arkansas
- Hermitage High School (Missouri) — Hermitage, Missouri
- Hermitage High School (Virginia) — Richmond, Virginia
