= Duncan F. Kenner =

American politician (1813–1887)

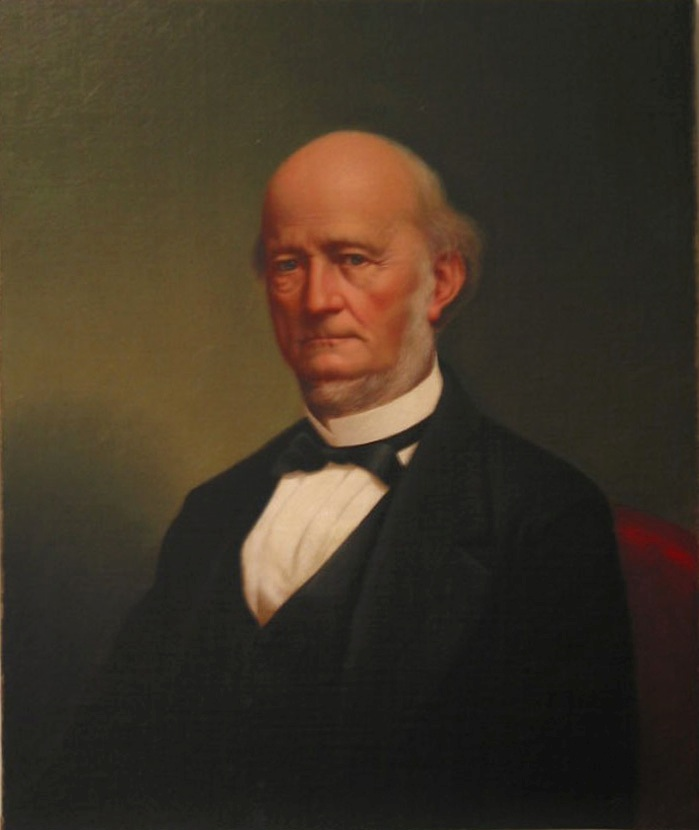

Deputy from Louisiana to the Provisional Congress of the Confederate States
- In office February 4, 1861 – February 17, 1862
- Preceded by: New constituency
- Succeeded by: Constituency abolished

Personal details
- Born: Duncan Farrar Kenner; February 11, 1813 New Orleans, Louisiana, U.S.
- Died: July 3, 1887 (aged 74) New Orleans, Louisiana, U.S.
- Resting place: Ascension Catholic Cemetery, Donaldsonville, Louisiana, U.S.
- Spouse: Anne Guillelmine Nanine Bringier

Duncan Farrar Kenner (February 11, 1813 – July 3, 1887) was an American politician who served as a Deputy from Louisiana to the Provisional Congress of the Confederate States from 1861 to 1862. In 1864, he served as the chief diplomat from the Confederate States of America to Europe.

== Biography ==
Douglas Farrar Kenner was born on February 11, 1813, in New Orleans to sugar planter and cotton factor William Kenner, and Mary Minor Kenner, daughter of Stephen Minor, the last governor of Spanish Natchez. His father's people were from Virginia. Kenner was married to the former Anne Guillelmine Nanine Bringier (August 24, 1822 – November 6, 1911). They resided at the Ashland Plantation.

According to Ulrich Bonnell Phillips, he was "long a slave trader with headquarters at New Orleans before he became a planter in Ascension Parish on a rapidly increasing scale." Kenner was the owner of sugar plantations in Louisiana. He used scientific techniques and was said to be the first man in Louisiana to use a railroad to bring sugar cane from the fields to the mill. He served as the President of the Louisiana Sugar Planters Association. He started his political career by working for John Slidell. He served for several terms in the Louisiana House of Representatives and was a member of the state constitutional conventions of 1845 and 1852, having presided over the latter conclave.

According to the US census of 1860, Kenner owned in excess of 600 slaves on his sugar plantations.

During the American Civil War of 1861–1865, he was a member of the Confederate Congress and chairman of its Ways and Means Committee. In 1862, he proposed a national income tax of 20%, including a schedule of exemptions. His tax bill went nowhere; but in April 1863, the Confederate Congress passed another act calling for a tax "in kind," payable with goods and agricultural produce rather than money, and based not on property but on agricultural produce and income it generated. In July 1862, while visiting with his family at Ashland Plantation during a recess of the legislature, Kenner narrowly avoided capture by the Union Army, making his escape after being warned by one of his slaves of the advance of Union troops. By this time he had become convinced that the emancipation of slaves was the only way to gain independence for the Confederacy. In 1864, he was sent by Jefferson Davis as special commissioner to England and France to secure the recognition of the Confederate States. Davis, through Kenner, offered the emancipation of the Confederate slaves in exchange for diplomatic recognition of the Confederacy by Britain and France. Following the capture of New Orleans in 1862, much of his property was confiscated and his slaves were freed.

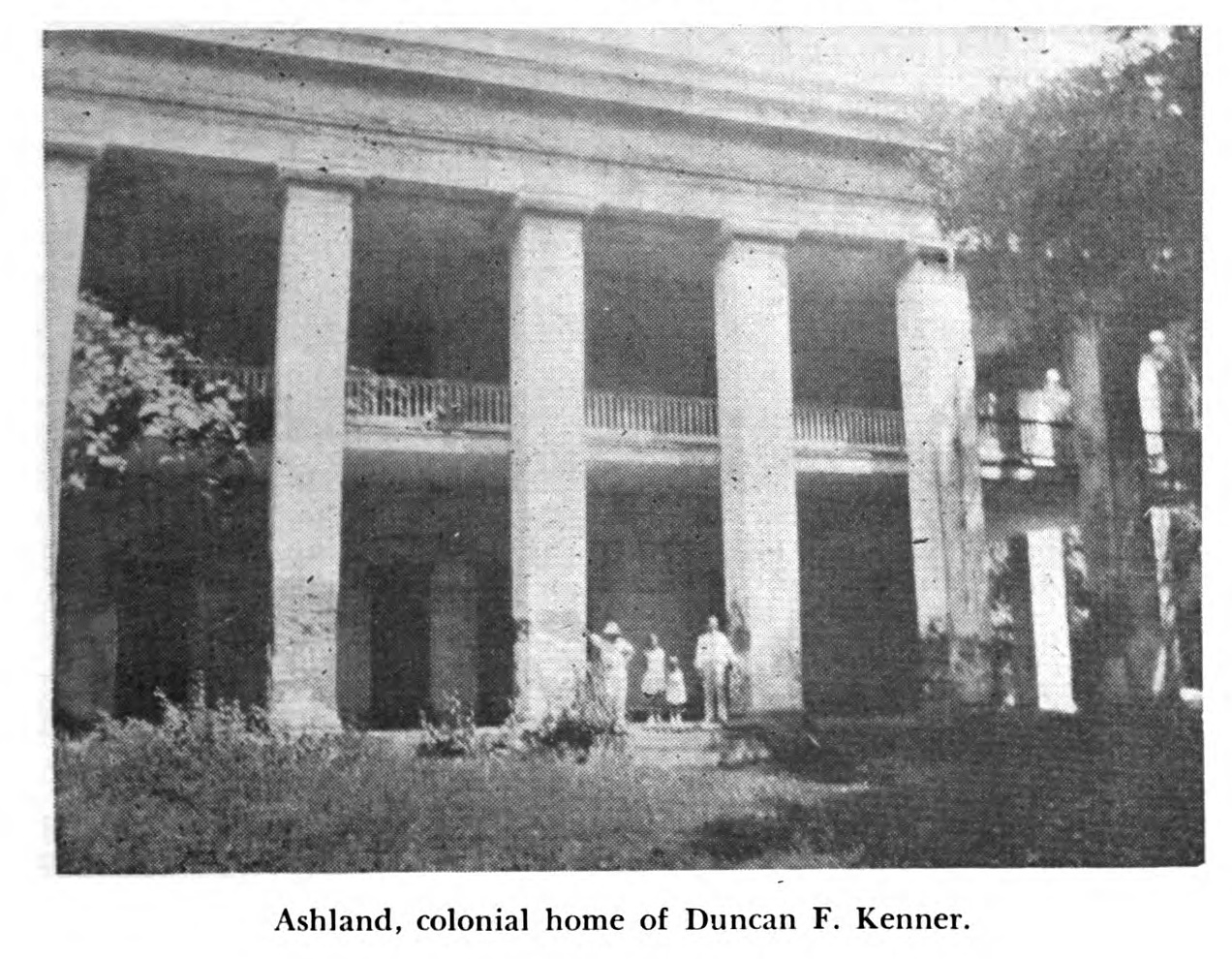
"Ashland, colonial home of Duncan F. Kenner"

After the war, Kenner regained his wealth. In 1877 he created the Louisiana Sugar Producer's Association, representing the largest planters in the state. He served as the president of the World Cotton Centennial. He also served on the Boards of Directors of several banks. Kenner died on July 3, 1887. He was buried in a tomb in the Ascension of our Lord Catholic Church Cemetery in Donaldsonville, Ascension Parish, Louisiana.

== Thoroughbred racing ==
Kenner was fond of horses and established a breeding operation for Thoroughbred horses at his Ashland Plantation. For his contribution to Thoroughbred racing, following its formation in 1971 he was inducted into the Fair Grounds Racing Hall of Fame. In 1880 he was a founding member of the New Louisiana Jockey Club and would serve as its president from 1886 until his death in 1887.

== See also ==
- Kenner and Henderson

Political offices
New constituency	Deputy from Louisiana to the Provisional Congress of the Confederate States; 1861–1862	Constituency abolished
