= René de Saunière de l'Hermitage =

English Huguenot exile (1653-1729)

René de Saunière de L'Hermitage (1653-1729) was an English Huguenot exile. His extant writings throw light on the European relations of England in the late seventeenth century.

== Early career ==
L’Hermitage was born in 1653, a Waldensian Huguenot. He was sent to England in 1687 after Louis XIV’ revocation of the Edict of Nantes and subsequent persecution of the Huguenot to forward the interests of his brethren with the powers of Europe.

He acted as agent for the Huguenot with the Netherlands, corresponding with the pensioner Antonius Heinsius and the Staten-Generaal from 1693. He remained in England for the term of his life but his literary output, especially his Dutch dispatches, are of moment and are now in the British Museum. Many historians, notably Macaulay have relied heavily on his despatches as a primary source. He died in 1729.
