= Tony Bacala =

American politician

Anthony Joseph "Tony" Bacala, Jr.

Louisiana State Representative for District 59 (Ascension Parish)
- Incumbent
- Assumed office January 2016
- Preceded by: Eddie J. Lambert

Personal details
- Born: July 1957 (age 69)
- Party: Republican
- Spouse: Lisa Faucheux Bacala
- Education: East Ascension High School Louisiana State University FBI National Academy
- Occupation: Law-enforcement officer

Anthony Joseph Bacala, Jr., known as Tony Bacala (born July 1957), is a Republican member of the Louisiana House of Representatives and a retired law enforcement officer.

== Background ==
Bacala is married to the former Lisa Faucheux (born July 1962), a Republican who is employed by the Ascension Parish School Board.

== House tenure ==
Bacala voted for and supported draft Louisiana House Bill 813 that would have made in vitro fertilization (IVF) treatments and some forms of birth control a crime, and prosecute women who get abortions for "murder." The draft bill intentionally has no exceptions for rape or incest, and only allows a narrow exception to save the mother's life. The bill allows treating natural miscarriages.

In April 2024, Bacala voted in favor of advancing House Bill 545 from the Administration of Criminal Justice committee. The bill, filed by Republican Beryl Amedee, would remove legal protections for obscenity from teachers and librarians in all Louisiana public schools.

On November 1, 2024, Bacala authored, filed, and presented House Bill 5 to the House Committee on Education. The bill required Louisiana school systems to provide permanent salary increases for public K-12 school teachers and other school employees. The funding came from state savings generated by paying off an unfunded accrued liability debt within the Teachers' Retirement System of Louisiana (TRSL). The bill also created a permanent $1,000 stipend for support workers. Passing unanimously in the State House and Senate chambers, as well as the House Concurrence Vote (on Senate amendments), the bill was signed into law.

On November 18, 2024, Bacala voiced support for Senate Bill 2, filed by Senator Heather Cloud, which lifts limitations on the types of crimes for which people under age 17 can be sentenced as if they are adults. Bacala remarked, “Some of these kids are already lost at 2 years old. I want to make that point. Everybody realizes it.”

Louisiana House of Representatives
Preceded by Eddie J. Lambert	Louisiana State Representative for District 59 (Ascension Parish); Anthony Joseph "Tony" Bacala, Jr. 2016 –	Succeeded by Incumbent
