= Prairieville, Louisiana =

- Census-designated place
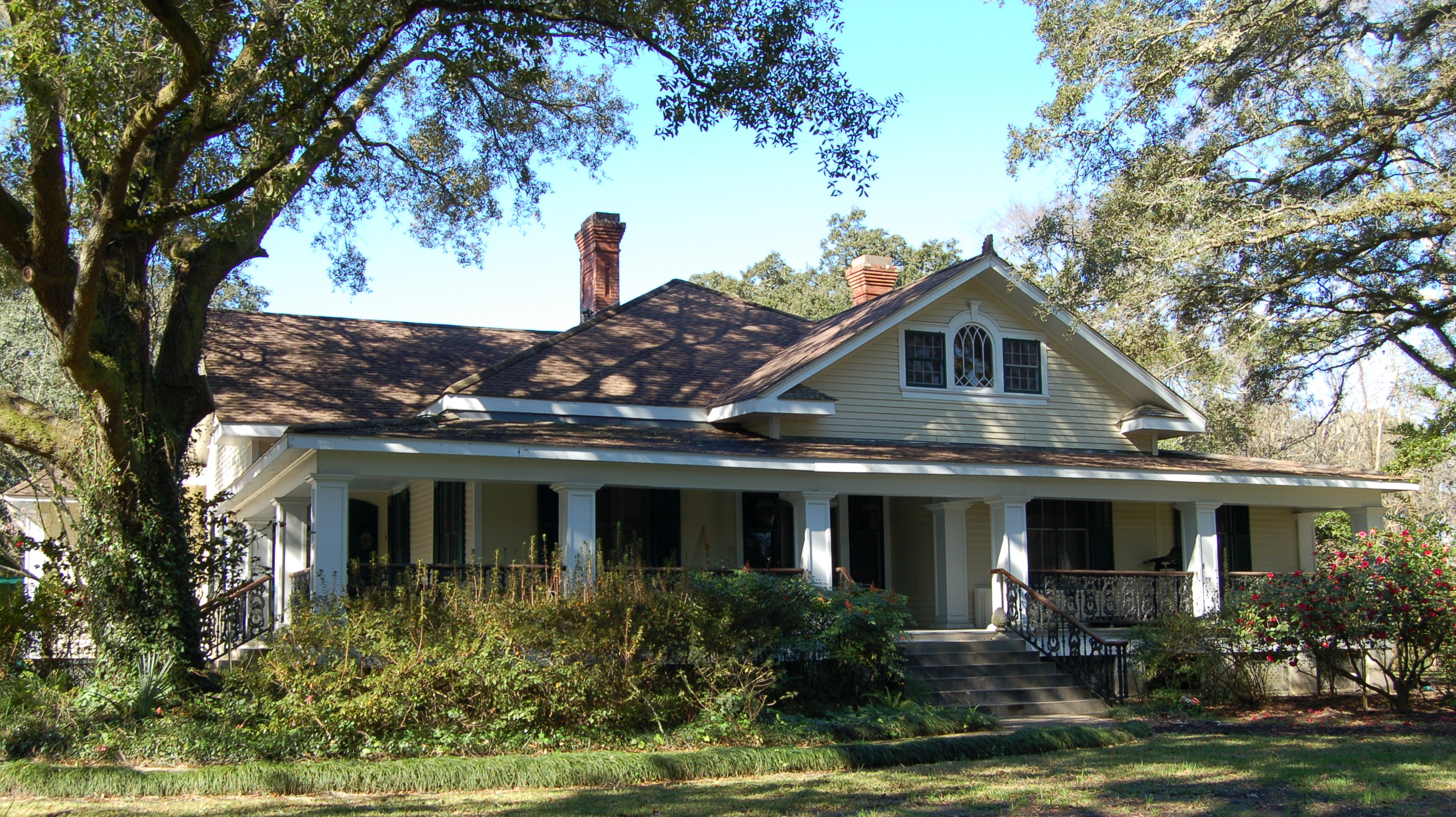
- Robert Penn Warren House in Prairieville

- Location of Prairieville in Louisiana
- Coordinates: 30°18′11″N 90°58′19″W
- Country: United States
- State: Louisiana
- Parish: Ascension

Area
  - Total: 22.08 sq mi (57.18 km^{2})
  - Land: 22.00 sq mi (56.97 km^{2})
  - Water: 0.081 sq mi (0.21 km^{2})
- Elevation: 23 ft (7.0 m)

Population (2020)
  - Total: 33,197
  - Density: 1,509.1/sq mi (582.67/km^{2})
- Time zone: UTC-6 (CST)
  - Summer (DST): UTC-5 (CDT)
- ZIP code: 70769
- Area code: 225
- FIPS code: 22-62385

Prairieville is a census-designated place in Ascension Parish, Louisiana, United States. It is south of Baton Rouge and north of Gonzales.

Prairieville is an expanding bedroom suburb of Baton Rouge. Its name is derived from the once plentiful pastures and prairies that were visible from Highway 73 (Jefferson Hwy.) and Airline Highway, which is now covered with development. Prairieville started off as a quiet community with few people.

In recent decades, Prairieville has experienced growth from migration out of Baton Rouge, with new residents particularly drawn to the area by its high-performing public schools and low crime rate. Prairieville had a 2020 census population of 33,197 inhabitants. If it were incorporated, it would be the largest city in Ascension Parish. Prairieville is in one of the fastest-growing areas in Louisiana. Prairieville's population is bigger than the parish's two largest incorporated cities, Donaldsonville (6,695) and Gonzales (12,231) combined.

== History ==
Prairieville is vulnerable to hurricanes and tropical systems due to its proximity to the coast of southeast Louisiana. Hurricane Gustav caused major damage to the Prairieville area; many trees were downed and power lines were down for weeks.

The most notable local property was the Phillips Farm. The farmhouse is still a local landmark in Prairieville, although the original owner died in 2005. The house is lined with live oaks and a white planked fence surrounds the grounds. The pasture was sold in 1992 at the start of the suburban development and a 250-resident subdivision named "Seven Oaks" surrounds the farm where the pastures were.

In 2006, the farmhouse was sold at auction following the death of Dr. Carey A. Phillips. The 40-acre (160,000 m^{2}) tract of land (including the house) has been made into a cemetery now called Oak Lane Memorial Park.

Prairieville is also known for the historic school Prairieville Middle, which was changed and established around the 1930s or later. It has remained the number one Middle school in the parish for its outstanding students and excellent grades. It scored the best score for LEAP time after time compared to other schools and the parish.

In 2020, Bluff Middle School opened, it is one of the newer middle schools in Ascension Parish.

== Demographics ==
Historical population
Census	Pop.	Note	%±
2010	26,895		—
2020	33,197		23.4%
U.S. Decennial Census

Prairieville was first listed as a census designated place in the 2010 U.S. census.

Prairieville CDP, Louisiana – Racial and ethnic composition Note: the US Census treats Hispanic/Latino as an ethnic category. This table excludes Latinos from the racial categories and assigns them to a separate category. Hispanics/Latinos may be of any race.
Race / Ethnicity (NH = Non-Hispanic)	Pop 2010	Pop 2020	% 2010	% 2020
White alone (NH)	21,390	23,477	79.53%	70.72%
Black or African American alone (NH)	3,295	4,835	12.25%	14.56%
Native American or Alaska Native alone (NH)	79	50	0.29%	0.15%
Asian alone (NH)	482	825	1.79%	2.49%
Pacific Islander alone (NH)	23	11	0.09%	0.03%
Some Other Race alone (NH)	36	106	0.13%	0.32%
Mixed Race or Multi-Racial (NH)	251	1,124	0.93%	3.39%
Hispanic or Latino (any race)	1,339	2,769	4.98%	8.34%
Total	26,895	33,197	100.00%	100.00%

As of the 2020 United States census, there were 33,197 people, 10,928 households, and 8,428 families residing in the CDP.

== Notable people ==
- Tony Bacala, law enforcement officer and politician
- Grace Broussard who, along with Dale Houston, formed the duo Dale and Grace and had a No. 1 hit record in 1963, "I'm Leaving It Up to You".
- Lolo Jones, former LSU track star and Olympic athlete
- State Representative Eddie J. Lambert
- Sidney McCrory, Louisiana Commissioner of Agriculture and Forestry from 1956 to 1960 and a native of Ascension Parish, is interred at Prairieville Cemetery.
- Joe Sevario, Louisiana State Senator
- Jacob Waguespack, MLB pitcher for the Toronto Blue Jays
- Former LSU football star and former New York Giants football player Corey Webster has a home in Prairieville.
- Scott Innes, famous voice actor who commonly plays the role of Scooby-Doo
- Justin Reid, NFL safety for the Kansas City Chiefs
