= Darrow, Louisiana =

Coordinates: 30°07′N 90°59′W

Darrow
- Census-designated place
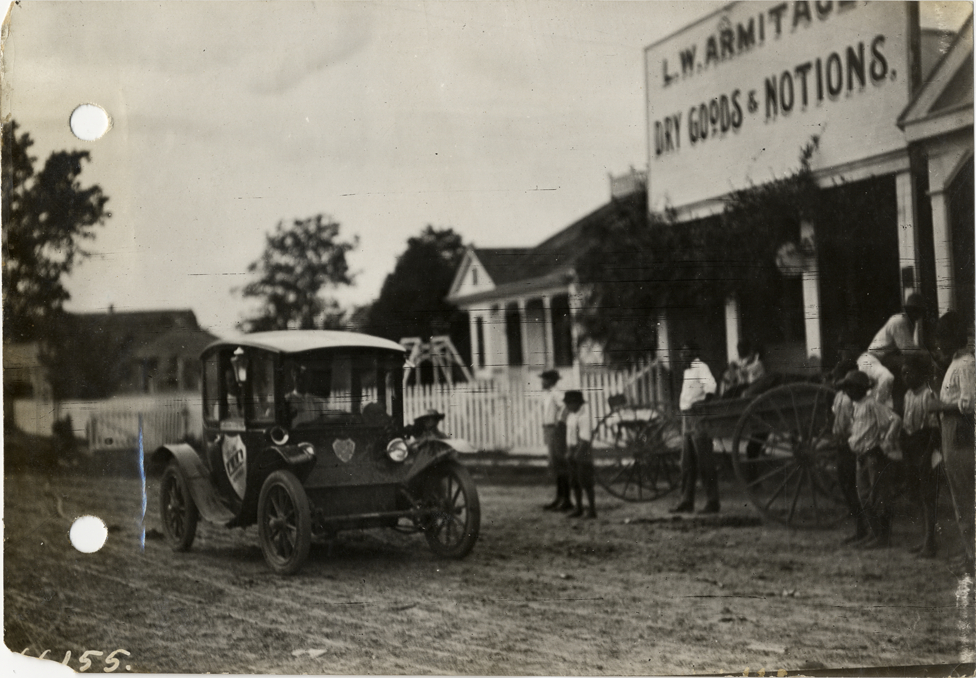
- A Flanders electric auto outside shop in Darrow, Louisiana, 1912

- Location within Louisiana Location within the United States
- Country: United States
- State: Louisiana
- Parish: Ascension

Population (2020)
  - Total: 200
- Time zone: UTC-6 (Central (CST))
  - Summer (DST): UTC-5 (CDT)

Darrow is an unincorporated community and census-designated place in Ascension Parish, Louisiana, United States. It was first listed as a CDP in the 2020 census with a population of 200.

It is the location of three properties listed on the U.S. National Register of Historic Places: Bocage, Helvetia Dependency, and Hermitage plantations. Darrow also is the home to the childhood house of James Carville after it was moved down the Mississippi River from Carville, Louisiana.

== Demographics ==
Historical population
Census	Pop.	Note	%±
2020	200		—
U.S. Decennial Census; 2020

Darrow first appeared as a census designated place in the 2020 U.S. census.

Darrow CDP, Louisiana – Racial and ethnic composition Note: the US Census treats Hispanic/Latino as an ethnic category. This table excludes Latinos from the racial categories and assigns them to a separate category. Hispanics/Latinos may be of any race.
Race / Ethnicity (NH = Non-Hispanic)	Pop 2020	% 2020
White alone (NH)	20	10.00%
Black or African American alone (NH)	165	82.50%
Native American or Alaska Native alone (NH)	0	0.00%
Asian alone (NH)	0	0.00%
Native Hawaiian or Pacific Islander alone (NH)	0	0.00%
Other race alone (NH)	2	1.00%
Mixed race or Multiracial (NH)	8	4.00%
Hispanic or Latino (any race)	5	2.50%
Total	200	100.00%

== Notable people ==
- Edward Joseph Price, state representative for District 58, former resident of Darrow
