= Hermitage, Saint Croix, U.S. Virgin Islands =

Hermitage, United States Virgin Islands
- Village
- Location within Saint Croix, U.S. Virgin Islands Location within the U.S. Virgin Islands
- Coordinates: 17.7494227°N 64.8067839°W
- Country: United States Virgin Islands
- Island: Saint Croix

Area
  - Total: 0.571 sq mi (1.478 km^{2})

Population (2020)
  - Total: 14
  - Density: 24.5/sq mi (9.47/km^{2})
- Time zone: UTC-4 (AST)

Hermitage, Saint Croix, also known as Estate Hermitage, is a settlement on the island of Saint Croix in the United States Virgin Islands. In the historical system of quarters and estates used there, it is estate 5 in St. Croix's King's Quarter. It has an area of 1.478 square kilometres (0.571 sq mi) and had a population of 14 as of 2020.

== History ==
Hermitage (Rings Quarter No. 5, and Princes Quarter No. 1, Centre Police District, Christiansteds Jurisdiction) is a former sugar plantation. As of 1816, it had a total area of 300 hectares of which 195 acres were planted with sugar cane and 105 were under other cultivation. In 1816, 107 enslaved labourers were present.

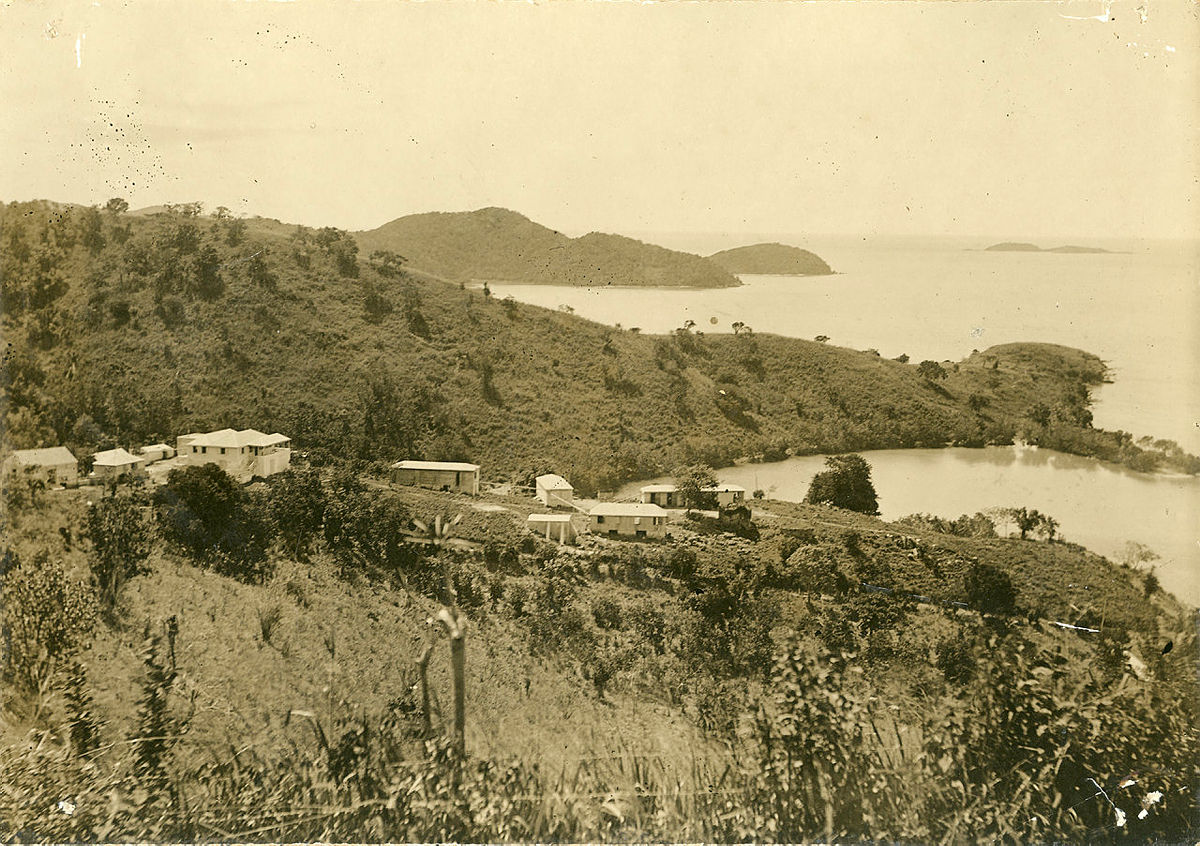
Hermitage in c.1900

On 19 July 1817, the estate of deceased Alexander Tovver closed and half of this property was transferred (value Ps. 94,781) to John, Alexander and George Tovver, Jannett, Margreth, Euphæmia, Anna Flora and Jane Tower. The other half was divided between James Tower and after his death to his children, John, James, Margareth, Mary, Elizabeth and Janet Tovver (one quarter) and William Tower (one quarter). On 24 February 1829, half of this property was sold by the attorney to the estate of deceased Alexander Tower, to Alexander Tower (the half of Strawberry Hili included) for £20,000. On 1 May 1852, Hermitage was sold by Alexander Tower on his own behalf and as attorney to John Tower's heirs, to H. C. Ratcliffe for $16,000.

== Sources ==
- U.S. Geological Survey Geographic Names Information System: Hermitage, Saint Croix, U.S. Virgin Islands
