= Hermitage, Saint John, U.S. Virgin Islands =

Coordinates: 18.35634°N 64.70014°W

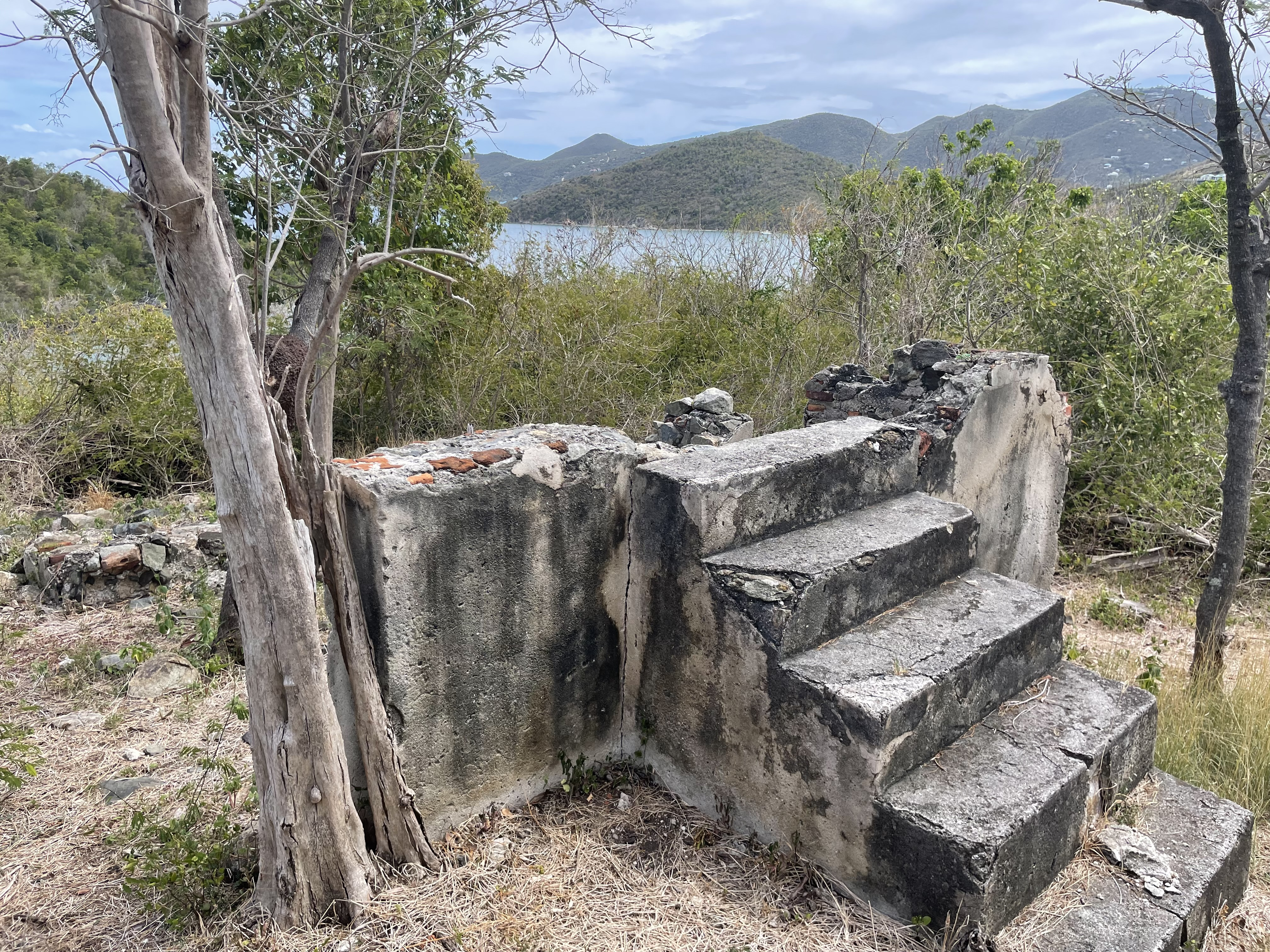
Hermitage Ruins

Hermitage is an area of Virgin Islands National Park on the island of Saint John in the United States Virgin Islands. It is located along the north side of Coral Bay, between the town of Coral Bay and the island's inhabited East End. The mangroves of Princess Bay, inside the National Park, are a popular kayaking and snorkeling spot.
