= Hermitage (Darrow, Louisiana) =

Historic house in Louisiana, United States

- The Hermitage
- U.S. National Register of Historic Places
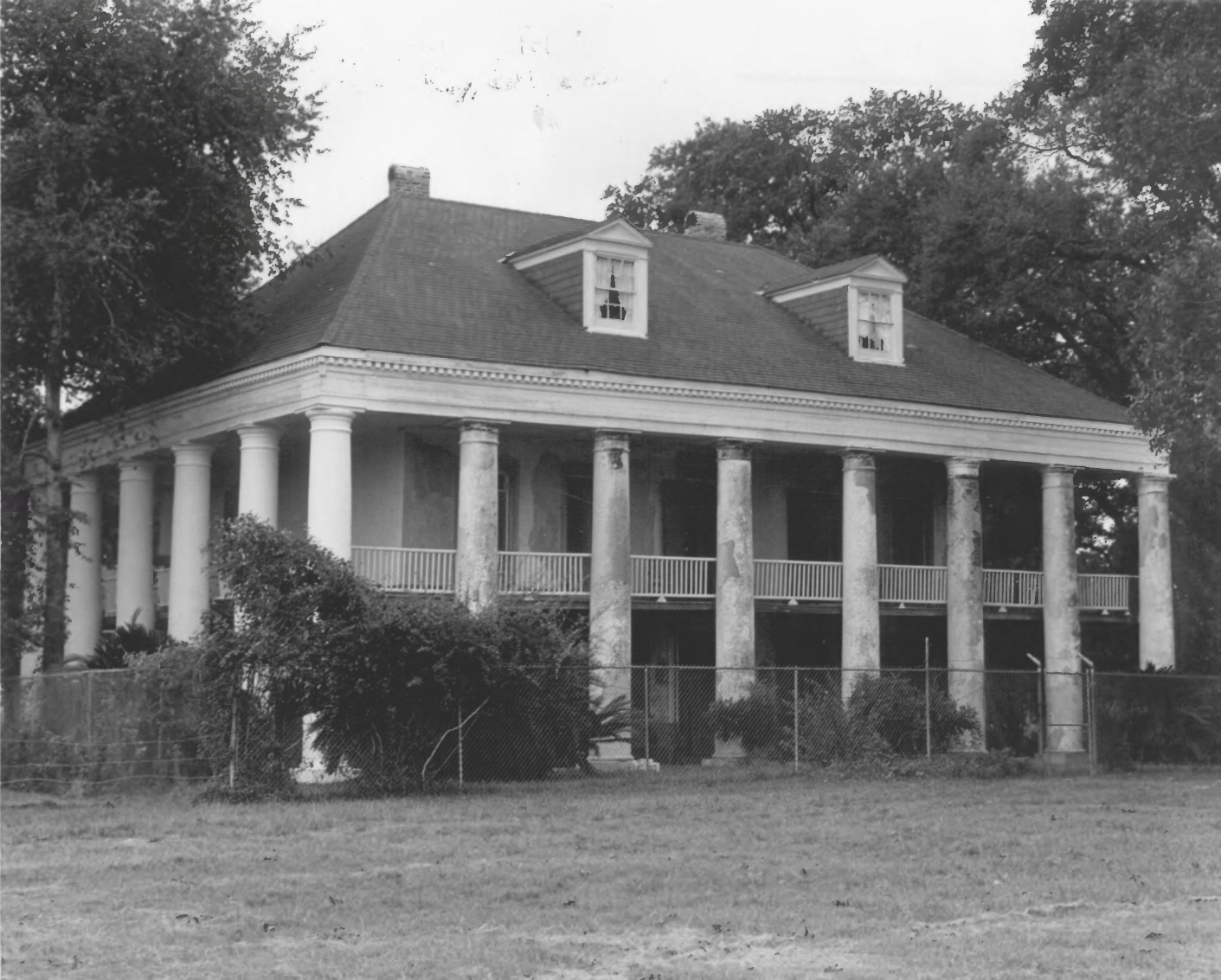

- Location within Louisiana Location within the United States
- Location: At the end of a dirt road, about 1.5 miles (2.4 km) east of Darrow and 0.25 miles (0.40 km) north of River Road
- Nearest city: Darrow, Louisiana
- Coordinates: 30°07′00″N 90°57′43″W
- Area: 25 acres (10 ha)
- Built: 1812
- Architectural style: Greek Revival
- NRHP reference No.: 73000859
- Added to NRHP: April 13, 1973

L'Hermitage is a Greek Revival plantation home. Marius Pons Bringier commissioned the home to be built in Burnside, Ascension Parish, Louisiana, as a wedding gift for his son, Michel Douradou Bringier (1789–1847), in 1812.

Michel Bringier served at the Battle of New Orleans (1814–15) during the War of 1812. L'Hermitage was named after General Andrew Jackson's home in Nashville, Tennessee. General and Mrs. Jackson visited here in the 1820s.

The building was listed on the National Register of Historic Places in 1973.

== See also ==
- National Register of Historic Places listings in Ascension Parish, Louisiana
