= Arrests of Ulysses S. Grant =

Reported arrests of the 18th U.S. president

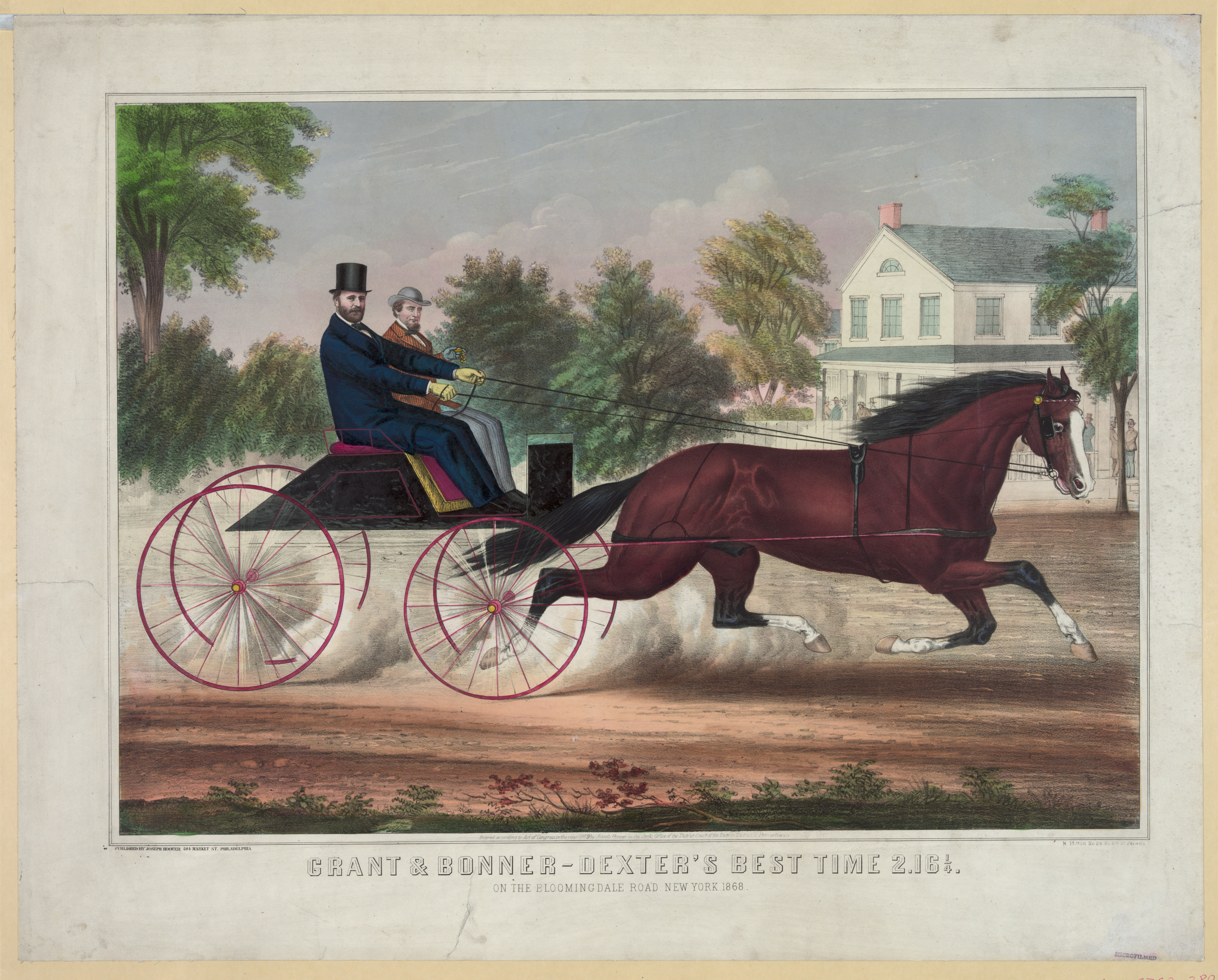
Grant and Robert E. Bonner racing in a carriage in New York, as depicted in an 1868 lithograph

There are three reported arrests of Ulysses S. Grant by officers of the Metropolitan Police Department of the District of Columbia (MPD), all for speeding by horse. Grant, who led the Union Army to victory in the American Civil War, was widely known for his prowess as a horseman. The first two of the reported arrests were in 1866, when Grant was commanding general; the third is said to have occurred in 1872, when Grant was serving as the president of the United States. While of questionable historicity, the third is the best-known; if it did occur, this would make Grant the only U.S. president to have been arrested while in office. (Note: A purported arrest of Franklin Pierce while in office, also for misconduct in a carriage, is likely apocryphal, according to Pierce biographer Peter Wallner. Donald Trump was arrested four times in 2023 as a former president.)

Both 1866 arrests were reported by the D.C. National Intelligencer. There does not appear to be contemporaneous evidence of an 1872 arrest, but from the 1890s onward, a number of newspaper articles about Officer William H. West (died 1915) included the claim that he had arrested Grant in 1872. In a 1908 profile in The Sunday Star—the sole detailed narrative of the event—West said that he arrested Grant for speeding in a horse-drawn carriage after a warning for doing so the day prior, and that Grant was brought to the police station, where he put up $20 (equivalent to $540 in 2025), which was forfeited the next day when Grant did not appear in court. Other accounts differ but generally involve a fine of similar value, the impoundment of the carriage, or both. After the MPD appeared to confirm the veracity of the arrest in 2012, a number of news media outlets accepted it as fact, although in some cases with reservations. However, because of the lack of contemporaneous documentation, historians at the Ulysses S. Grant National Historic Site have questioned whether the event occurred.

Grant is characterized as resistant to police authority in the first narrative and as deferential in the latter two. The image of Grant deferring to West has been cited as a symbol of the rule of law, including in a dissenting opinion at the Supreme Court of the Philippines, in children's education, and in discussions of presidential criminal immunity in the United States.

== 1866 arrests ==
On April 9, 1866, when Grant was lieutenant general (promoted later that year to General of the Army), the National Intelligencer of D.C. reported that while "exercising his fast gray nag" on 14th Street, Grant was detained for fast driving by two officers of the Metropolitan Police Department of the District of Columbia (MPD). Grant offered to pay the fine, but "expressed his doubts of their authority to arrest him and drove off". Several days later, Grant "acknowledged the service of a warrant for fast driving and appeared before the Justice of the Peace and paid the fine". The National Intelligencer's report was republished in newspapers around the country, including The New York Times. The Daily Richmond Whig and Staunton Spectator added that "it was a bad example in General Grant to violate a law, but a worse one to treat the officers of law with contempt".

Several months later, the Fourth of July issue of the Richmond Daily Dispatch reprinted a National Intelligencer article announcing that Grant was arrested a second time for speeding: "The General took the arrest very good humoredly, said it was an oversight, and rode over to the second Precinct station house and paid his fine." Participating in both 1866 arrests was Officer S. T. Crown of the Seventh Precinct, who was nicknamed 'Rarey' Crown for his "daring feats" in pursuing speeding horses.

== Alleged 1872 arrest ==
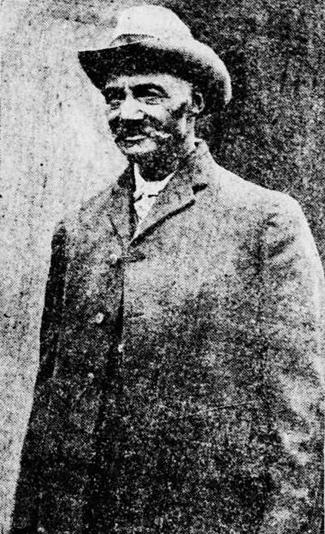
West in 1908

The claim that Grant was arrested while in office is associated with William H. West, a former Union Army private who joined the MPD in 1871.

An 1897 article from The Washington Post speaks of "a police officer named West who once arrested President Grant for fast driving on Vermont avenue", but says that he was not taken to the police station. In a 1901 article regarding a disciplinary action against West, the Post says that he "gained notoriety soon after his appointment by arresting President U. S. Grant for riding horseback on a pavement." West retired later that year, and the Post repeated this version of events upon West's death in 1915, also mentioning that he "was commended by the President". The Sunday Star ran a brief article in 1906 mentioning West having arrested Grant for speeding in 1872 and in 1908 published an interview with West on the topic, which is the primary account of the alleged arrest.

=== West's 1908 Star account ===
Shortly after being assigned his beat by 13th and M Street NW, West comes to the scene of an incident where a woman and young child have been badly injured by a speeding team of horses, violations being common in that area due to the proximity of Brightwood Trotting Park. While West is discussing the matter with residents, Grant and several friends come racing down the street as well, prompting West to order them to stop; Grant succeeds in halting his horses despite their excitement. He asks West what he wants to which West replies,

I want to inform you, Mr. President, that you are violating the law by speeding along this street. Your fast driving, sir, has set the example for a lot of other gentlemen. It is endangering the lives of the people who have to cross the street in this locality, and only this evening a lady was knocked down by one of these racing teams.

Grant apologizes, commits to following the speed limit in the future, and asks after the injured woman. West's answer prompts him to reiterate his commitment to follow speed laws. The next evening, again posted at 13th and M, West watches a large number of horse teams speed past; West hails the riders. Grant, leading the pack, is unable to stop for a full block, but eventually gets his horses under control and returns, followed by six others, some of whom are also government officials. Smiling and looking like "a schoolboy who had been caught in a guilty act by his teacher", Grant asks West if the latter thinks he has been speeding. West recalls his caution from the day before, at which Grant feigns poor memory and blames the horses. West replies,

I am very sorry, Mr. President, to have to do it, for you are the chief of the nation, and I am nothing but a policeman, but duty is duty, sir, and I will have to place you under arrest.

West takes Grant to the police station. Grant invites West to have a seat in the carriage and asks him about his background. West tells the former general of his own service in the evacuation of Richmond. Grant assures West that he will face no adverse consequences for arresting him. At the station, Grant puts up $20 (equivalent to $540 in 2025) as collateral, as do the six companions who have driven to the station with him, who protest more strongly, to Grant's amusement. Grant's collateral is forfeited the next day when he does not appear in court. The other six do object to their arrests, but all are fined heavily after testimony by members of the community. The men appeal; Grant works to ensure that West will not be punished as a result of their advocacy.

West is later assigned to the mounted force, where he talks to Grant often about equestrian matters. According to West's account, he is afterward especially called to investigate and then solves the theft of a pair of stallions, rare Arabian horses that had been a sultan's gift during Grant's world tour. (Note: Grant's Arabian stallions are well-documented, but there is no record beside West's account of their ever being stolen from Edward Fitzgerald Beale's estate at Ash Hill.)

=== MPD comments and other accounts ===
In one common narrative dating to 1929 or earlier, West grabs Grant's horse by the bridle and is dragged 50 feet (15 m). He then recognizes Grant and apologizes, to which Grant says, "Officer, do your duty" or similar.

A 150th anniversary book published by the MPD repeats the claim of West having been dragged 50 feet. The book contains several alternate narratives as to what happened after the arrest, including one in which police impound the vehicle but do not fine Grant. In 2012, MPD Chief Cathy Lanier commented on the arrest in a manner widely perceived as confirming its authenticity. Lanier gave a sequence of events in which officers are unsure if they can charge Grant absent an impeachment, and thus let him off with a fine and impound the vehicle, leaving him to walk back to the White House. As of February 2023, the MPD academy's training material references all three arrests, saying that the third occurred in 1877 and characterizing it in terms similar to Lanier's 2012 comments.

=== Historicity ===
A 2018 segment on NPR's Weekend Edition included audio of prominent Grant scholar John F. Marszalek discussing a summarized version of West's account; Marszalek had previously described the narrative to DCist with the preface "The story goes". Michael S. Rosenwald of the Post, noting also a post on Grant Cottage's website treating West's narrative as factual, concluded in 2018, based on Lanier's comments, that the arrest did occur but that "it's nearly impossible to know if [the Star article] is the whole truth and nothing but the truth"; this was echoed by Meilan Solly in Smithsonian in March 2023. In early April 2023, William K. Rashbaum and Kate Christobek of The New York Times also took Lanier's comments as confirmation, but acknowledged the apparent lack of documentation prior to the emergence of West's claim.

In a series of tweets the same day as the Times article, journalist Joshua Benton questioned the reliability of accounts published in newspapers of the late 1800s and early 1900s, pointing out various inconsistencies and the lack of surviving accounts prior to 1897. Later that month, the Ulysses S. Grant National Historic Site published the results of a partial analysis of the historical record, finding no contemporaneous news reporting, which would have been unusual given the presence of seven daily newspapers in D.C. at the time and the fact that 1872 was a presidential election year. They continued, "Tentative research of other primary source documents from time has failed to produce definitive evidence. Additionally, The Papers of Ulysses S. Grant provide no information on an arrest of Grant that year, nor do they indicate that Grant and West maintained a friendship after 1872."

=== Legacy ===
The 1872 arrest anecdote was recorded as a moral tale (cf. George Washington's cherry-tree) in the Sunday school periodical The Well Spring in 1903 or earlier, later reproduced in several educational publications.

Grant scholar Marszalek describes it as an appropriate and "wonderful" irony that a president who championed equality under Reconstruction might have been arrested by a Black man.

The alleged arrest was cited in a 1945 dissent by Gregorio Perfecto of the Supreme Court of the Philippines, (Note: The Philippines was a U.S. territory until 1946.) as an example of "how law is really above all men". It has since drawn attention in the context of legal proceedings against Donald Trump, during whose presidency (2017–2021) many debated whether a sitting president can be arrested; it became a topic of discussion again surrounding Trump's indictment and arrest in 2023. In the Texas Law Review, Saikrishna Bangalore Prakash, a professor at University of Virginia School of Law, argues that Grant's arrest and what Prakash views as Grant's "de facto guilty plea" show "a welcome willingness to honor a familiar principle: every American is equal before the law", contrary to the notion that the president cannot be arrested. Similarly, Nicholas Kristof views the arrest as "a beautiful tribute to democracy" and the rule of law, a repudiation of the idea that "L'État, c'est moi" ('I am the state').

== See also ==
- Legal affairs of Andrew Jackson
