= John Dick (judge) =

American judge

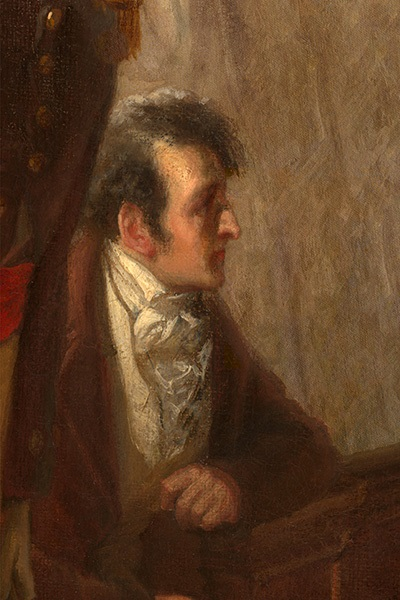

Judge of the United States District Court for the Eastern District of Louisiana Judge of the United States District Court for the Western District of Louisiana
- In office March 3, 1823 – April 23, 1824
- Appointed by: operation of law
- Preceded by: Seat established by 3 Stat. 774
- Succeeded by: Thomas B. Robertson

Judge of the United States District Court for the District of Louisiana
- In office March 2, 1821 – March 3, 1823
- Appointed by: James Monroe
- Preceded by: Dominic Augustin Hall
- Succeeded by: Seat abolished

Personal details
- Born: John Dick; 1788 County Tyrone, Ireland
- Died: April 23, 1824 (aged 35–36) New Orleans, Louisiana, U.S.
- Education: read law

John Dick (1788 – April 23, 1824) was a United States district judge of the United States District Court for the District of Louisiana, the United States District Court for the Eastern District of Louisiana and the United States District Court for the Western District of Louisiana.

== Education and career ==
Born in 1788 in County Tyrone, Ireland, Dick read law in 1811. According to the Natchez Ariel in 1827, "He was a native of Ireland; his family emigrated to the U. States, when he was but an infant. Reared in Virginia, he resided there till the year, we believe, 1811, when he settled in New Orleans. Mr. Dick was respected in his profession, and esteemed as a man. His political principles were of the Jefferson school; to the governments of Europe he was an avowed and determined enemy." His older brothers Nathaniel and James Dick moved to New Orleans around 1819. They ran N. & J. Dick & Co., which was a leading cotton factorage of New Orleans and later land-speculation concern.

He entered private practice in New Orleans, Louisiana from 1812 to 1815. Among his clients in 1814 was J. B. Prevost. He was United States Attorney for the District of Louisiana from 1814 to 1821. As U.S. Attorney he was the one who indicted Andrew Jackson on charges of obstruction of justice and contempt of court, the case being United States v. Andrew Jackson. According to the Department of Justice, "According to the indictment, Jackson had 'disrespectfully wrested from the clerk an original order of the honorable the judge of this court, for the issuing of a writ of habeas corpus in the case of a certain Louis Louallier, then imprisoned by the said Major General Andrew Jackson.' Jackson incurred the charges of obstruction when he imprisoned the judge who had charged him with contempt. When the future President of the United States appeared in court, he refused to answer the interrogatories and promptly received a fine of $1,000 which he paid and then left the court."

== Federal judicial service ==
Dick was nominated by President James Monroe on March 1, 1821, to a seat on the United States District Court for the District of Louisiana vacated by Judge Dominic Augustin Hall. He was confirmed by the United States Senate on March 2, 1821, and received his commission the same day. Dick was reassigned by operation of law to the United States District Court for the Eastern District of Louisiana and the United States District Court for the Western District of Louisiana on March 3, 1823, to a new joint seat authorized by 3 Stat. 774. His service terminated on April 23, 1824, due to his death in New Orleans.

== Personal life ==
As of 1819 he was vice president and counselor for the Hibernian Society of New Orleans. Dick was married in January 1820 in Natchez, Mississippi, to Mary Farar, a daughter of Benjamin Farar Jr. of Laurel Hill plantation. They first met in 1817 and after their wedding moved into a house on Faubourg St. Mary. In October 1820, his wife, their baby and numerous in-laws died in a yellow fever outbreak at Bay St. Louis. Dick married second Frances Ann Kenner, daughter of William Kenner and Mary Minor, on August 16, 1823. Frances remarried and lived until 1875.

Dick died of consumption in New Orleans in 1824. His estate was administered by Nathaniel Dick and John B. Humphrey.

== Sources ==
- Lester, Dick M. (Summer 1993). "John Dick of New Orleans". Louisiana History: The Journal of the Louisiana Historical Association. 34 (3): 357–365. ISSN 0024-6816.

Legal offices
| Preceded by Dominic Augustin Hall | Judge of the United States District Court for the District of Louisiana; 1821–1823 | Succeeded by Seat abolished |
| Preceded by Seat established by 3 Stat. 774 | Judge of the United States District Court for the Eastern District of Louisiana; Judge of the United States District Court for the Western District of Louisiana; 1823–1824 | Succeeded by Thomas B. Robertson |
