= Horsemanship of Ulysses S. Grant =

Aspect of the life of Ulysses S. Grant

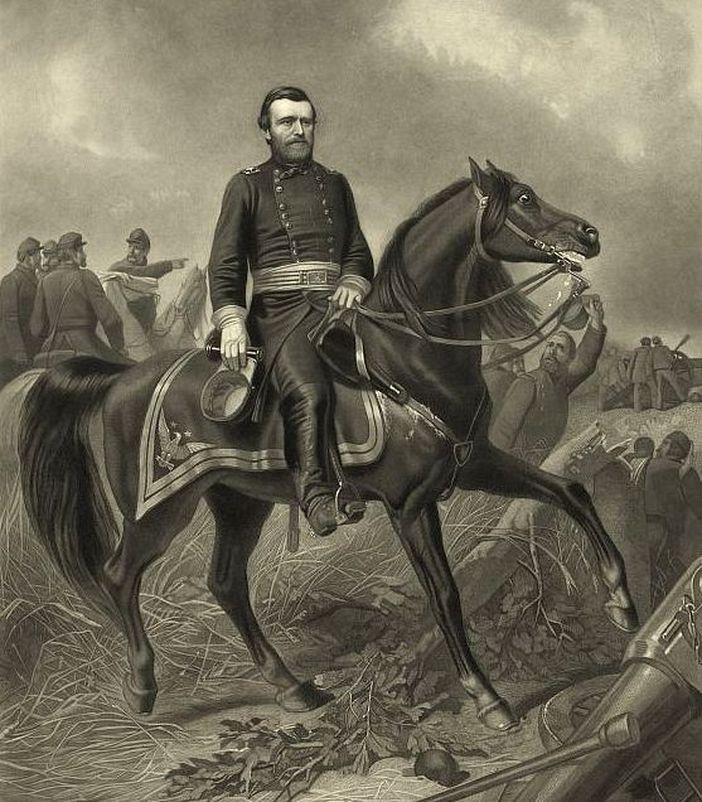
Ulysses S. Grant astride Cincinnati

Ulysses S. Grant (1822–1885) served as the commanding general of the Union Army during the Civil War and later became the 18th president of the United States, serving two terms. Born in Ohio near the Ohio River, Grant developed a natural affinity for horses from an early age, which allowed him to ride, train, and manage them in an exceptional capacity.

His father, Jesse R. Grant, had great confidence in his ability and gave him tasks involving horses that were considered difficult, especially for a youth. At age five, he was noted for performing difficult stunts bareback, and soon after, he was also performing chores, hauling timber, and driving teams of horses for long distances by himself. From boyhood through his military career, Grant had a well-established reputation for training and managing horses. As a cadet, he set a high-jump record at West Point that stood for 25 years.

Horses played an important role throughout Grant's military career, carrying him with dispatches, accompanying him as he inspected and encouraged troops, and taking him into battle, sometimes resulting in his horse being shot from underneath him. During his lifetime, he mostly owned and rode large and powerful horses. Noted for his love of and ability to ride and manage horses, Grant was occasionally given some of the best horses available as gifts from friends and admirers.

== Frontier Youth ==
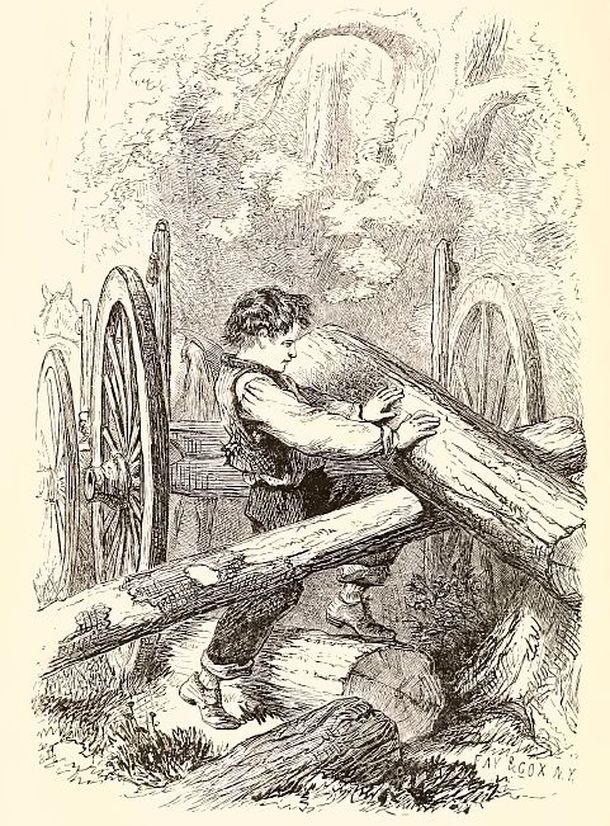
Young Grant loading logs onto a wagon using horses to pull the timber aboard

Ulysses S. Grant was born on April 27, 1822, in Point Pleasant, part of the Ohio frontier. Grant's first experience on horseback occurred at a circus visiting Georgetown when he was two years old. Watching the horses in the ring, Ulysses asked his parents if he could sit on top one of the ponies and ride it, to which his parents acquiesced. It was a happy event for Grant as he rode around the ring. When Grant was little more than a toddler, he was often found by his father's shop with the teams of horses, restlessly crawling and playing about their legs and swinging from their tails. On one of several such occasions, a worried neighbour once noted this activity and exclaimed to his mother, Hannah S. Grant, "Mrs. Grant, do you know where your boy is? He is out there swinging on the tails of Loudon's horses!" Calmly, Hannah would typically reply, "horses seem to understand Ulysses."

When he was young, Grant was always eager for any work that involved riding a horse or driving a team of horses. At the age of five, he proved to be a skilled and daring rider. Riding at a fast pace, he would stand on one leg while holding the reins, maintaining his balance as the horse galloped—a feat that amazed his onlookers. At age seven, while his father was away for the day, Grant harnessed a restless three-year-old colt, which had never been broken except to the saddle, to a sleigh. He then drove the young horse about, hauling loads of brushwood throughout the day. Upon his father's return, he discovered that his son had managed to bridle and harness the colt, amassing "a pile of brush as big as a cabin" all by himself.

When he was about nine years old, Grant had acquired a reputation for fast riding and stunts. Jockeys whose steeds suffered from what was called "a distemper" would bring their animals to Georgetown for Grant to ride them hard and fast, a technique known to raise the horse's body temperature, curing the illness. Local farmers would also bring their problem horses for him to train. These challenges delighted the boy very much. Biographer Hamlin Garland commented that Grant had a "mysterious" ability to communicate with horses, and that "he could train a horse to trot, rack, or pace, apparently at will." Grant, reflecting on his youthful experiences with horses, would later write in his Personal Memoirs:

I began hauling all the wood used in the house and shops. I could not load it on the wagons, of course, at that time, but I could drive, and the choppers would load, and some one at the house unload. When about eleven years old, I was strong enough to hold a plough. From that age until seventeen I did all the work done with horses, such as breaking up the land, furrowing, ploughing corn and potatoes, bringing in the crops when harvested, hauling all the wood, besides tending two or three horses, a cow or two, and sawing wood for stoves, etc., while still attending school. For this I was compensated by the fact that there was never any scolding or punishing by my parents...

Grant's father began assigning various chores that required horses to Grant by the time he was eight years old. He soon became a proficient teamster, working every day, hauling wood or bark. At ten, Grant would drive a pair of horses by himself from his home in Georgetown to Cincinnati, forty miles away, often bringing home passengers. Jesse did not insist on his working about the barkmill, provided there was other available work, and often entrusted Grant with a team of horses on his own. He also allowed him to manage the horses on the farm and participate in the farming.

When Grant was eleven, he established a reputation among his peers and neighbors by riding a trick pony belonging to the circus that came to town. The pony had been trained to throw off anyone who attempted to mount him. After several other boys tried and failed, Grant came forward and said, "I believe I can ride that pony." He mounted the restless animal, having no reins and its mane cut short, and wrapped his arms firmly around its neck. After a frantic effort to buck him off, the pony finally abated, and Grant rode it around the ring for a couple of minutes, earning himself a round of applause from the spectators and the five-dollar prize promised to anyone who could stay on the pony.

Grant's father viewed horses pragmatically. As a tanner and leather goods merchant, horses to him were simply beasts of burden and a potential source for hides. By contrast, Grant viewed them as wonderful individuals, each with their own temperament. He was able to assess any horse he was working with and possessed a temperament of his own that allowed him to best employ any given horse.

At age twelve, Grant's father sent him into the forest with a team of horses and a wagon to pick up a load of timber. The men at the lumber camp were supposed to load the wagon but were nowhere to be found when Grant arrived. Not wanting to return empty-handed, Grant devised a method by hitching the logs and pulling them aboard the wagon one at a time using the horses. After securing the load, Grant hitched the team back to the wagon and returned home, which amazed his father. Biographer James McClure described Grant's "remarkable self-possession of mind" on an occasion when he was transporting two women in a two-horse wagon across a creek swollen from heavy rain, where he found the water level much deeper than usual. Upon crossing, he suddenly found the water to be so deep that the horses were almost swimming, while the water was up to the wagon's deck level. The women became greatly alarmed and began to scream, but Grant, though in a very precarious situation, remained calm, looked over his shoulder, and assured the ladies by saying, "Don't speak, I will take you through safely," and continued on without further incident.

== Military ==
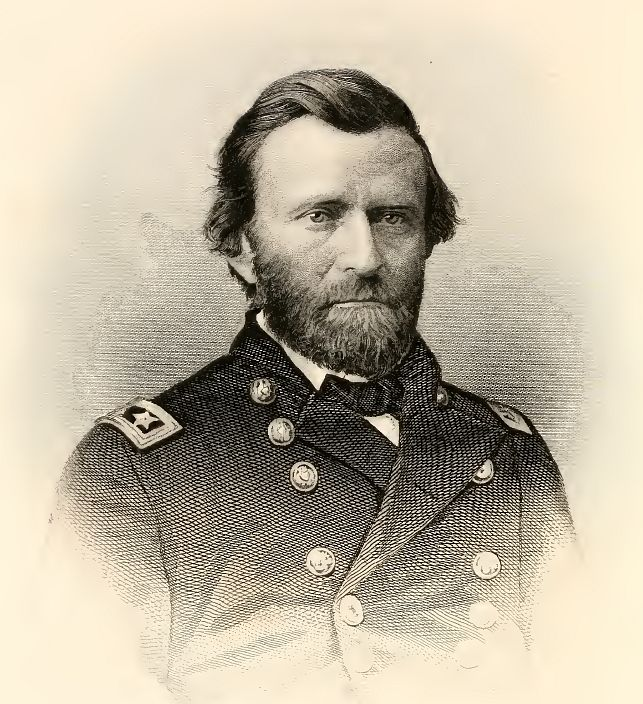
Engraving of Grant in General's uniform

Grant also gained a reputation for excellent horsemanship during his military career, and consequently would sometimes receive horses as gifts from admirers. In the Mexican–American War, he performed remarkable feats on horseback during battle. During the American Civil War, Grant owned several horses, riding them on scouting missions while inspecting troops and formations, and using them in battle. At times, he would retire one horse and use another during long campaigns. Grant was known to take exceptional care of his mounts and always kept them brushed "smooth as silk" with all the trappings in perfect order.

A war correspondent, having often observed Grant's horsemanship, once characterized his overall military involvement with horses: "Roads are almost useless to him, for he takes short cuts through fields and woods, and will swim his horse through almost any stream that obstructs his way. Nor does it make any difference to him whether he has daylight for his movements, for he will ride from breakfast until two o'clock in the morning, and that too without eating. The next day he will repeat the dose, until he finishes his work."

=== West Point ===
At the age of 17, Grant was nominated to attend West Point in the spring of 1839. After being accepted, he made his way across Pennsylvania to New York City and traveled up the Hudson River to West Point, arriving and signing the register on May 29. There he soon surpassed all the cadets at the academy in horsemanship. Just as Grant was brought horses at Georgetown, cadets brought Grant their unruly horses. Grant's classmate Ingalls said Grant got along with horses, "not by punishing the animal...but by patience, and tact, and his skill in making the creature know what he wanted to have to do."

Among the horses at the academy was a dark bay horse that was so untamable it was about to be condemned. Grant selected it as his horse. Every day he would devote time to it, bridling, mounting, and riding it with ease, while the entire class would watch and admire his command of the horse.

Horsemanship was an important part of the curriculum at West Point. in June 1843, the cadets assembled in the riding hall during their final graduating exercises, where all members performed their riding exercises before Superintendent Richard Delafield and a large assembly of spectators. The academy riding master, Henry Hershberger, approached the high-jump bar, raised it another foot (30 cm), higher than an average man's head, and then called out, "Cadet Grant," prompting a low murmur of wonderment from among the crowd. From among the cadets, all mounted on their horses, Grant sprang forward, riding a large and powerful chestnut mount. The cadets all recognized the horse as York, a horse that no one else was able to ride. Grant moved to the far end of the hall, and as he turned his mount towards the bar, silence fell over the crowd. He dashed forward, gauging his pace, and with a great leap, horse and rider cleared the bar with apparent ease. Hershberger cried out, "very well done, sir," as the assembly applauded. Grant had set a high-jump record at West Point that stood for 25 years.

Grant's personal biographer Albert D. Richardson said of Grant's horsemanship: "There was nothing he could not ride. He commanded, sat, and jumped a horse with singular ease and grace; was seen to the best advantage when mounted and at a full gallop; could perform more feats than any other member of his class, and was, altogether, one of the very best riders West Point had ever known."

Grant's classmate, the future Confederate General James Longstreet, said of Grant that, "In horsemanship, however, he was noted as the most proficient in the Academy. In fact, rider and horse held together like the fabled centaur..." and that he was "the most daring horseman in the academy." General Rufus Ingalls later recalled that when an unruly or stubborn horse was added to the string of academy horses, Grant was always called upon to tame it. After graduation, Grant requested service in the cavalry, but despite his great horsemanship, there was no opening available, and he was assigned to the 4th Infantry Regiment, his second choice.

=== Mexican–American War ===
During the Mexican–American War, Grant expressed his amazement at the great herds of feral mustangs roaming between the Nueces and Rio Grande rivers, moving about like buffalo in a continuous mass. "The country was a rolling prairie, and from the higher ground the vision was obstructed only by the earth's curvature." Grant estimated that to corral a herd of this size, an area the size of the state of Delaware would be required.

Grant was appointed Quartermaster of his regiment in August 1846. Because of his organizational skills and ability with horses and managing teams, he was put in charge of the mule teams used by the Army. Wanting to participate in battle and share in its dangers, Grant found the assignment beneath his ability and submitted a protest to his colonel, which was denied. His new assignment involved loading and packing the mules correctly and efficiently, and keeping abreast of their overall well-being. For every eight soldiers, there was one pack mule, meaning Grant would have to inspect and manage up to fifty mules, along with five mule wagon teams. To assist in the task and responsibility, Grant would hire local Mexican mule handlers, who were more familiar with handling Mexican mules, which differed in habits from those bred in America, that the Army had purchased while in Mexico.

When a volunteer was needed to carry an important dispatch for reinforcements, Grant came forward and demonstrated his equestrian ability at the Battle of Monterrey by carrying the dispatch past snipers while hanging off the side of his horse at a fast gallop, keeping the animal between him and potential fire. Before leaving the city, he stopped at a house in American hands and assured some wounded Americans that he would send for help.

=== Civil War ===
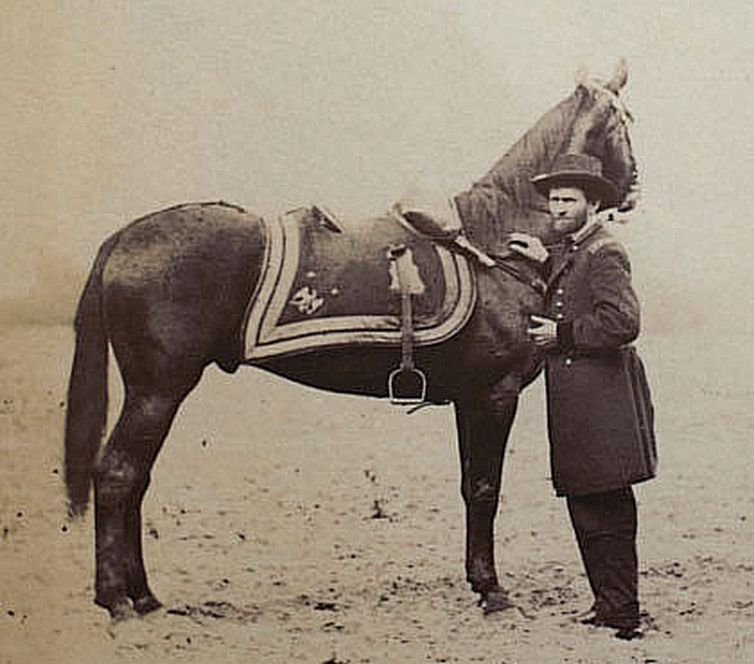
General Grant and his horse, Cincinnati

When the Civil War broke out, Grant was working at his father's leather shop in Galena, Illinois. With his home next to the shop, Grant had no need for a horse and did not own one at the time. During the war, Grant owned and rode more than ten different horses, including Cincinnati, Claybank, Egypt, Fox, Jack, Jeff Davis, Kangaroo, Little Reb, Methuselah, and Rodney.

Grant was appointed colonel of the Twenty-first Illinois Volunteer Infantry on June 14, 1861, at which time he purchased a horse while in Galena. It was a strong horse, but while Grant was leading his regiment from Springfield, Illinois, to Missouri, the mount proved unfit for military duty.

While Grant was encamped on the Illinois River for a few days, a local farmer brought in a cream-colored stallion named Jack. High-spirited and intelligent, the horse proved to be a great mount for long marches but lacked tenacity and responsiveness in battle. Grant consequently referred to him as "Old Nuisance." The horse was striking in appearance, with dark eyes and a silver mane and tail. Grant often rode this mount during the campaigns of 1862–1863 and kept him as an extra horse for ceremonial purposes. Jack carried Grant away from Admiral Foote's riverboat the night before the attack on Fort Donelson, and was also the horse that endured difficult scouting missions in the Tennessee mud before and during the Battle of Shiloh. Grant rode Jack through the Cumberland to the Battle of Chattanooga. After Chattanooga, Grant was called away and retired the horse to his business advisor, J. R. Jones in Northern Illinois, for his personal use. (Note: After the war, Grant gave Jack to the Sanitary Fair in Chicago where he was raffled off, bringing $4,000 to the Sanitary Commission. There are more references to Jack in Grant biographies than any of Grant's other horses, save his fabled horse, Cincinnati.) During this time, Grant purchased a second horse, called Fox, a powerful and spirited animal with exceptional endurance, which he also rode during the siege and battles around Fort Donelson and also at Shiloh.

On August 5, 1861, Grant was appointed Brigadier General of volunteers. Soon after, he purchased a pony for his son, Frederick Grant, who was with him at the time, along with another horse for field service for himself. At the Battle of Belmont, Grant's first battle in the Civil War, his horse was killed under him, and he was compelled to use his son's pony. This horse proved unfit for battle, so he turned it over to Captain William S. Hillyer, his aide, who then offered Grant his own horse. The Union advance had scattered the Confederates away from Camp Johnston, but the Confederates soon regrouped and began to surround the Union troops. Some officers were considering surrender, but Grant, confident in his horse, reassured and reorganized his troops. During the final retreat, Grant narrowly escaped on his horse by leading it down a steep riverbank. Grant recalled, "my horse put its fore feet over the bank without hesitation or urging, and, with his hind feet well under him, slid down the bank and trotted aboard the boat, twelve or fifteen feet away, over a single gang-plank."

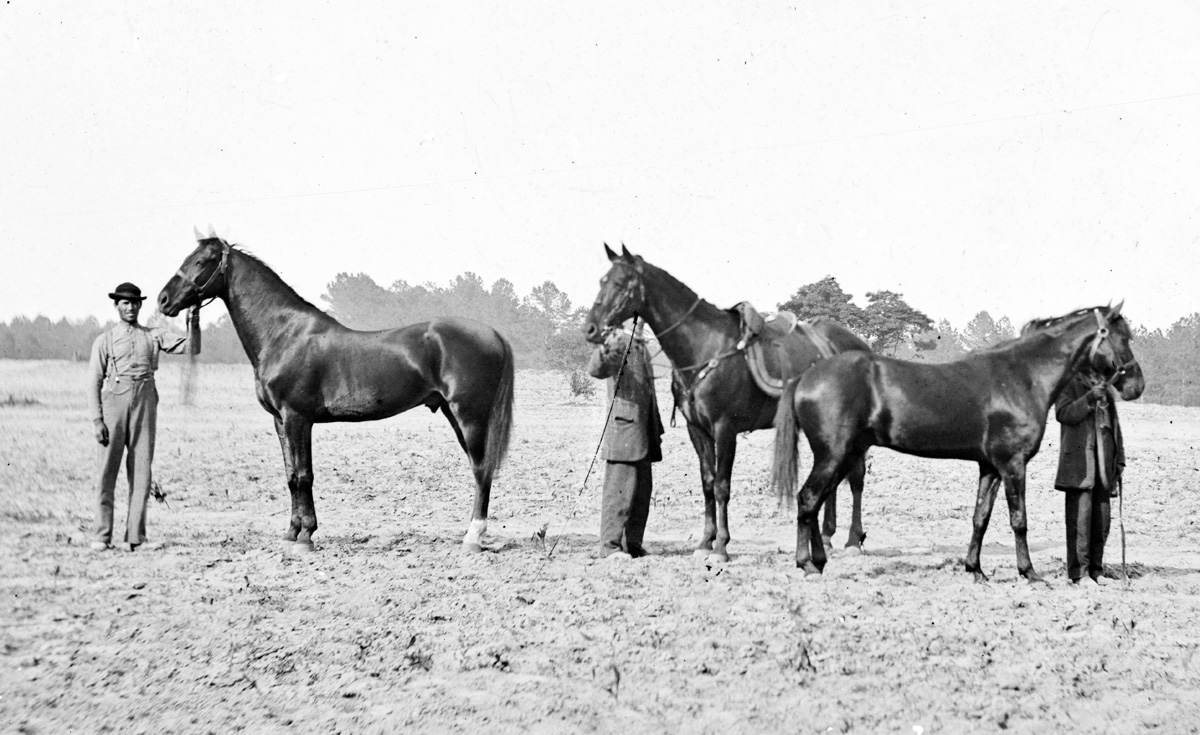
Photograph of three of Grant's horses during the Overland Campaign (Cold Harbor, Virginia), from left to right: Egypt, Cincinnati, and Jeff Davis

Cincinnati was a bay, said to have been 17.2 hands (70 inches, 178 cm) high and was a son of Lexington, considered to be the fastest thoroughbred in the United States at that time. Grant considered Cincinnati "the finest horse I have ever seen." On rare occasions, Grant allowed only two other people to ever ride Cincinnati, one of whom was Abraham Lincoln. Of Lincoln, Grant once said, "Lincoln spent the latter days of his life with me. He came to City Point in the last month of the war and was with me all the time. He was a fine horseman and rode my horse Cincinnati every day."

In October 1862, a month before the siege of Vicksburg, Grant sent his horse Jack to Illinois for a month's rest. During the Vicksburg Campaign, Grant acquired another horse captured by a raiding party at a plantation in Mississippi. Grant had the opportunity to ride the animal and found it had a "delightful" gait. Grant purchased the horse from the Army and named it "Jeff Davis," a derisive nod to Confederate president Jefferson Davis. He rode it instead of Cincinnati when there were long journeys to be made, because of its surefootedness and ability to stay fresh. Shortly after the Vicksburg campaign, Grant suffered his most serious horse-related injury while visiting General Nathaniel P. Banks in New Orleans. According to Grant's account of the incident, the horse he was using, named "Charlie," was "vicious and but little used," and while he was reviewing Banks's troops, a locomotive in the street sounded its whistle, causing the horse to bolt. It stumbled and fell upon Grant's left leg, causing him to be "rendered insensible" and unconscious. He awoke in a hotel with several doctors looking over him. His leg was swollen from the knee to his thigh. Grant described the pain as "almost beyond endurance." He was bedridden for over a week, unable to even turn over by himself. He was later put on a steamer and taken back up the Mississippi to Vicksburg, where it was some time before he was able to move about on his own.

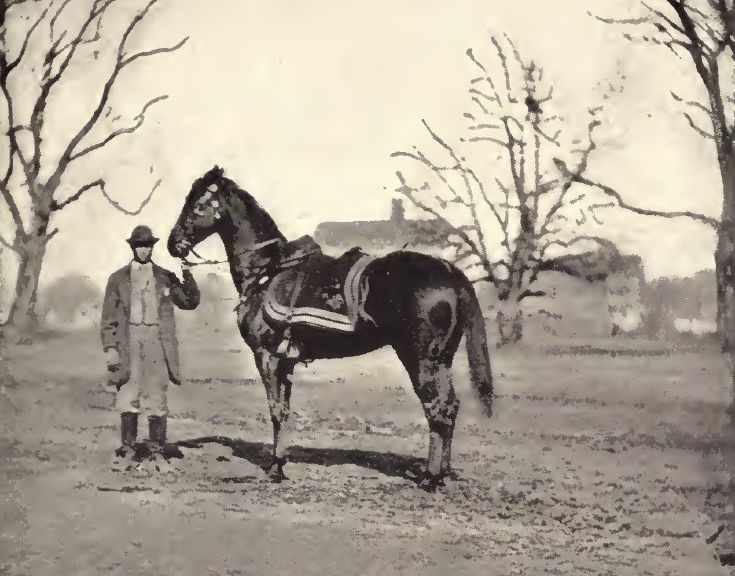
Egypt

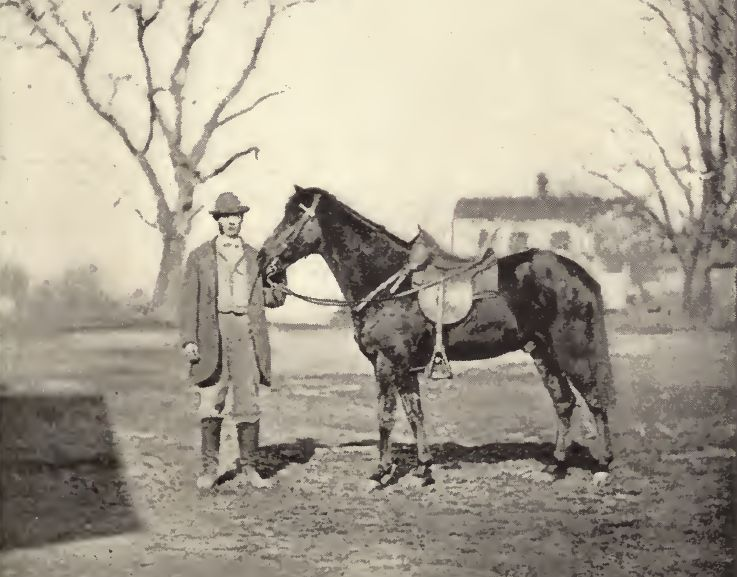
Jeff Davis

Photographs by Mathew Brady

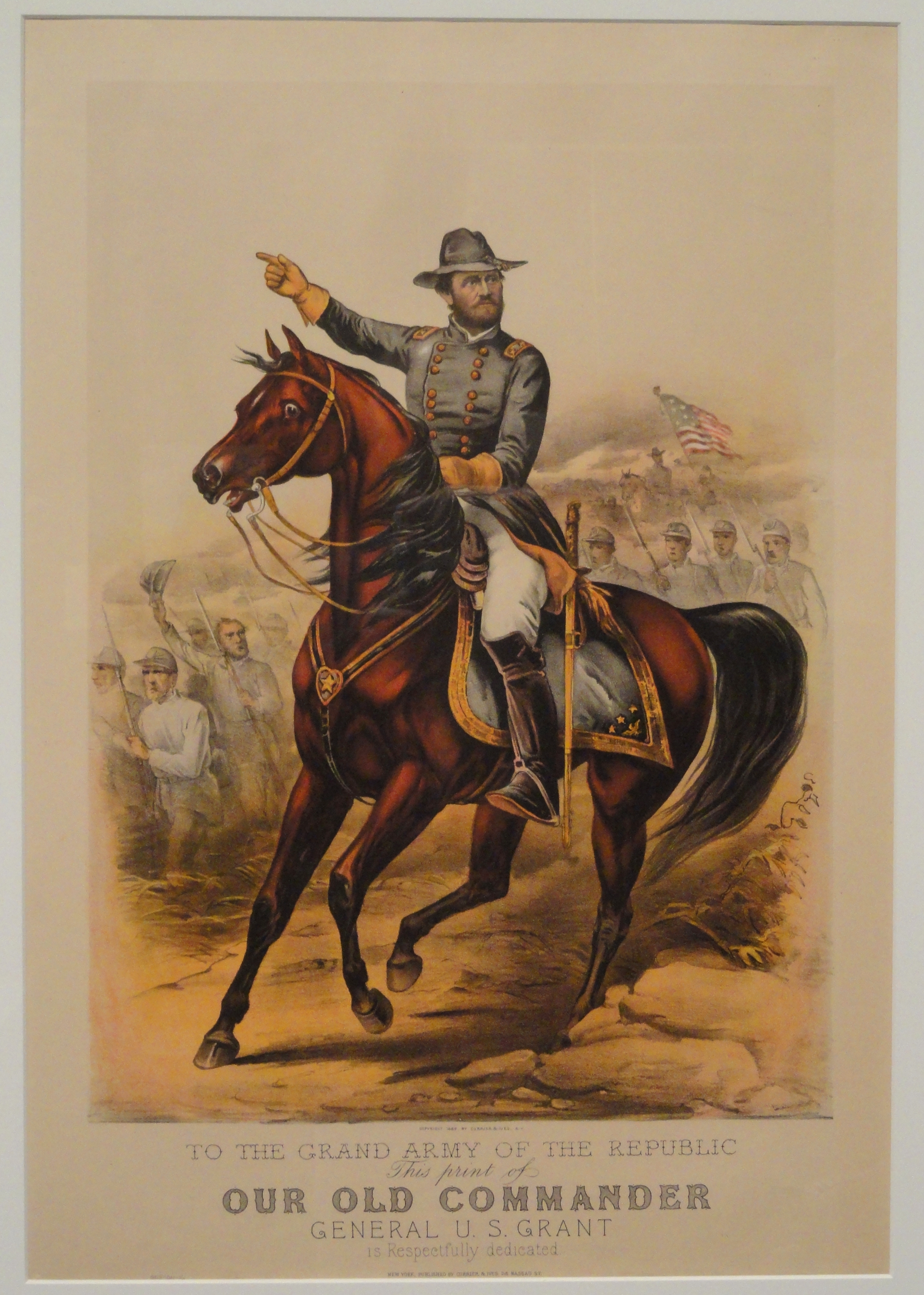
Our Old Commander 1885 Currier & Ives

In December 1863, while still in Chattanooga, Grant was given a fine Kentucky thoroughbred as a gift by the citizens of Egypt, Illinois, who knew Grant was in need of a new horse after retiring Jack. Grant wrote a letter of thanks to the citizens and named his new gift horse Egypt in their honor. At seven years old, Egypt was a handsome dark bay who measured 16 hands (64 inches, 163 cm). The horse proved useful in the months to come, as Grant traveled over the snow- and ice-covered Cumberland Mountains in January; Grant also used Egypt throughout the Overland Campaign in Virginia.

At the surrender at Appomattox, Grant met with Robert E. Lee at the picket lines between the armies. He and Lee sat on their horses for hours, Grant astride Cincinnati, and Lee on Traveller, and discussed the terms of surrender and the condition of the South in sight of their soldiers. Before departing, Lee requested that his officers be permitted to leave with their horses. Grant, having farmed with horses and knowing many of the Confederate officers were small farmers, allowed them to return home with their horses, swords, and their honor.

== Presidency ==
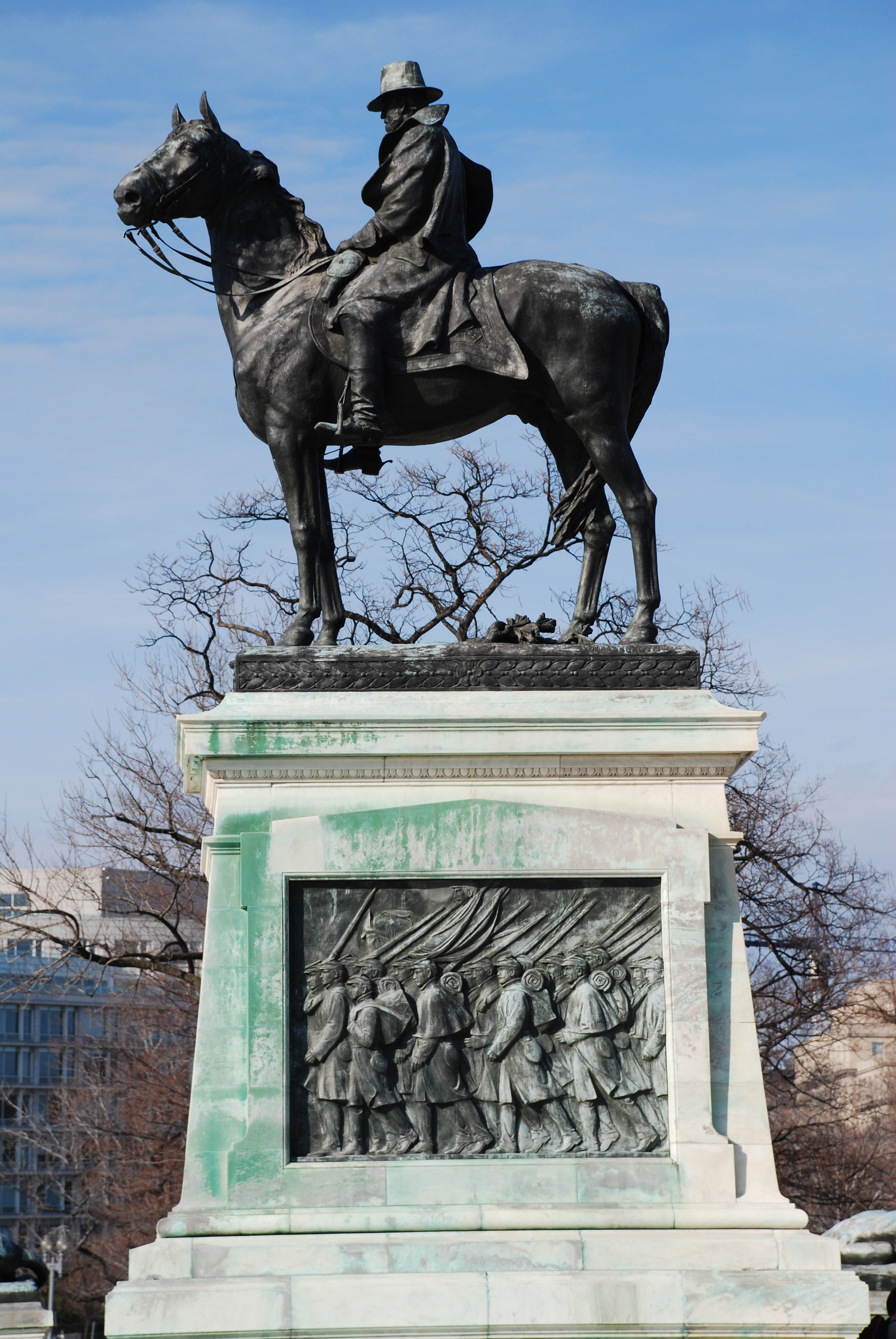
The Ulysses S. Grant Memorial is a monument to Grant astride Cincinnati at the base of Capitol Hill in Washington, D.C. (Note: Not to be confused with Grant's tomb.) The monument, which is 39 feet (12 m) high, is the second-largest equestrian statue in the United States.

When Grant became president in 1869, three of his horses—Cincinnati, Jeff Davis, and Egypt—were brought to the White House stables. According to Albert Hawkins, the stable master at the capital at that time, Grant, during his second term, arranged for a statue of him mounted on Cincinnati. For almost a month, Grant would have the bridle and saddle put on Cincinnati and rode out to meet the sculptor daily. Hawkins also noted that Grant's other horse, Jeff Davis, was a kicker and had the habit of biting when the stable hands got close to him. Despite this, Grant was able to handle him as soon as he entered the stable. The horse would lay its ears back and move about restlessly until Grant approached him, calming the animal with a few simple pats on the back.

Grant, refusing an offer of $10,000 for Cincinnati, brought the horse with him when he became president and moved to Washington, D.C. In 1878, the horse died at the home of Daniel Ammen. Nearly all depictions of Grant on horseback in drawings, granite, and bronze, are astride Cincinnati, including the Ulysses S. Grant Memorial in Washington, D.C.

After the Civil War, Grant gained possession of White Haven, previously owned by his wife's brother Frederick T. Dent. (Note: Dent was a former Union General and classmate of Grant at West Point; he served as a military secretary to President Grant.) While he was president, Grant transformed the estate into a horse breeding farm and designed its large horse stable. Completed in 1871, the stable was large enough to house 25 horses. All of Grant's horses were either received as gifts or purchased by Grant. He mostly owned Thoroughbred and Morgan horses, (Note: Morgan Horses are one of the earliest horse breeds developed in the United States.) but also enjoyed raising other breeds. Grant would not race his horses, never attended such events, and thought the practice of horse racing for amusement was cruel to the animal.

Grant remained involved in equestrian activity during his presidency, including by many accounts racing his carriage on city streets. In 1872, he was arrested by police officer William H. West for speeding on 13th Street NW. While West's account of the events cannot be fully verified, it is generally accepted that the arrest occurred and that Grant paid a fine (or forfeited collateral) of up to $20 (equivalent to $538 in 2025), had his buggy impounded, or both.

== World Tour ==
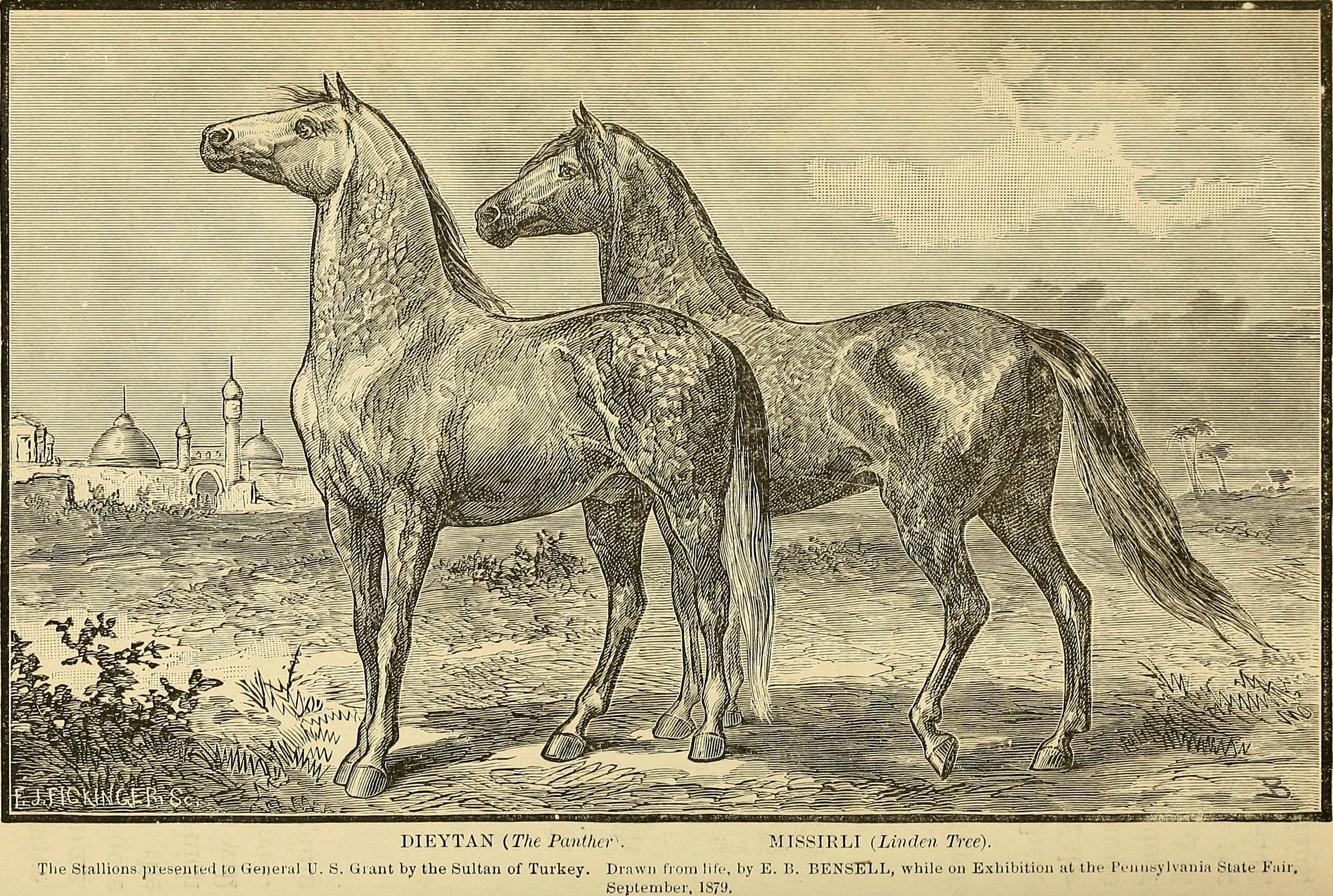
Gifts from the Sultan to Grant, two Arabian stallions

Shortly after his presidency in 1877, Grant and his wife Julia embarked on a tour around the world. In March, the Grants visited Constantinople and Greece. While visiting Sultan Abdul Hamid II, Grant was very impressed with his stable of purebred Arabian horses. Grant commented that the stallions would "pick up their feet like a cat, and so quickly, that no one can scarcely follow their motions." Impressed by Grant's praise for the stallions, the Sultan allowed him to pick out any two he desired and take them home. Grant chose a "dappled gray" and an "iron gray," (Note: These stallions were named Leopard and Linden Tree (orig. Djeytan and Missirli), and were the subject of a period monograph, General Grant's Arabian Horses. Leopard has purebred Arabian descendants today. Linden Tree is now believed to have been a Barb.) which he had shipped back to New York, and they were later kept at Ash Hill, the Maryland horse farm of a wealthy friend.

In the spring of 1878, the Grants toured Milan. Grant was conducting an honorary review of the Bersaglieri, the pride of the Italian Army, who were well known for their horsemanship. At the time, Alfred M. Fuller, an ex-Union Captain in the cavalry during the Civil War, also happened to be visiting there. He was familiar with Grant's horsemanship, which he enthusiastically brought to the attention of the Bersaglieri officers who were accompanying the Grant party. Subsequently, they brought a restless steed to present to Grant, which had to be restrained by three other officers. The horse appeared as if it could break loose at any given moment. Grant approached the young and never-ridden horse with astonishment and admiration, while some of the young officers smiled as if they were intentionally setting up Grant with a horse they assumed would throw him off in short order. As Grant slowly mounted the animal, he took hold of the reins and assumed a perfectly erect posture. The horse immediately made several attempts to throw him off and then, unexpectedly, gently trotted forward, acknowledging Grant as its master. For this, Grant received applause. Fuller recalled that at that time, "horse and rider were as one being," as Grant rode the mount for two hours. When Grant returned to the hotel, he looked relaxed while the officers who oversaw the affair looked fatigued.

== Funeral ==
After being diagnosed with throat cancer, while writing his memoirs, Grant died at the age of 63 on July 23, 1885. On August 8, his coffin was placed on a catafalque draped in black with plumes at each corner, where twenty-four black stallions, arranged in twelve pairs, pulled Grant's hearse along Broadway in New York City. Twenty generals, led by General Winfield Scott Hancock astride a black stallion, led the entourage and team of horses.

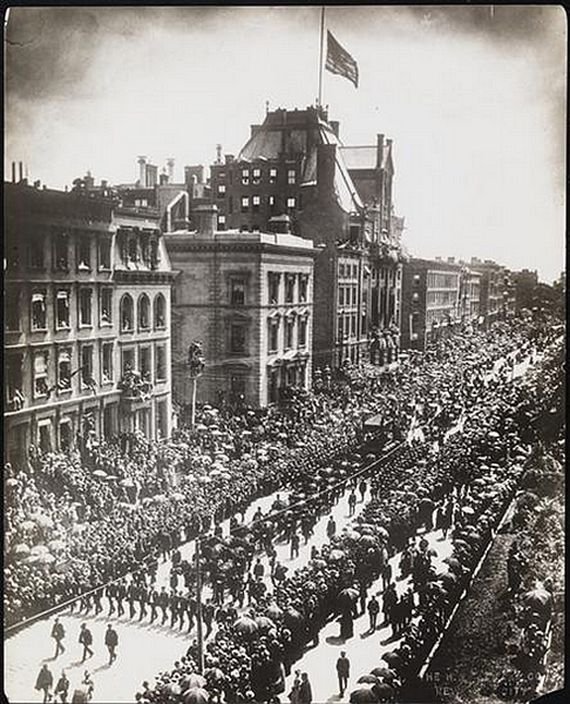
Ulysses S. Grant funeral procession See other versions in edit summary.

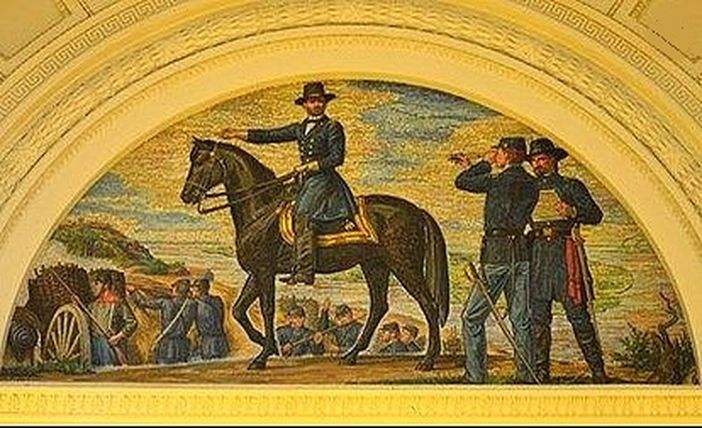
A painting of Grant on his horse, Cincinnati, inside the dome of Grant's Tomb

== See also ==
- List of horses of the American Civil War
- List of historical horses
- Horses in warfare
- Glossary of equestrian terms
- Bibliography of Ulysses S. Grant
- Horses of Andrew Jackson

== Bibliography ==
- Armistead, Gene C. (2013). Horses and Mules in the Civil War: A Complete History with a Roster of More Than 700 War Horses. McFarland. ISBN 978-1-4766-0237-0.
- Badeau, Adam (1887). Grant in Peace. From Appomattox to Mount McGregor. Hartford: S. S. Scranton & Co.
- Brands, H. W. (2012). The Man Who Saved the Union: Ulysses S. Grant in War and Peace. New York: Doubleday. ISBN 978-0-385-53241-9.
- Brisbin, James Sanks (1868). The campaign lives of Ulysses S. Grant, and Schuyler Colfax. Cincinnati, C.F. Vent & Co.
- Catton, Bruce (2015) [1968]. Grant Takes Command. Boston: Little, Brown. ISBN 978-0-316-13210-7.
- Chernow, Ron (2017). Grant. New York: Penguin Press. ISBN 978-1-59420-487-6.
- Coolidge, Louis Arthur (1917). Ulysses S. Grant. New York, Houghton Mifflin Company.
- Dowdall, Denise M. (2012). From Cincinnati to the Colorado Ranger – the Horsemanship of Ulysses S. Grant. Lulu.com. ISBN 978-0-9574021-2-6.
- Fuller, Alfred M., Captain Second United States Cavalry (1896). McClure's Magazine, Nov 1896 - April., 1897, Vol VIII. New York, S. S. McClure, limited.
- Fuller, Colonel J. F. C. (1929). The Generalship of Ulysses S. Grant. New York, Dodd, Meade & Company.
- Garland, Hamlin (1898). Ulysses S. Grant; his life and character. New York, Doubleday & McClure co.
- Goode, James M. (1974). The Outdoor Sculpture of Washington, D.C.: A Comprehensive Historical Guide (pages 243–248). Smithsonian International Press. ISBN 0-87474-138-6. idGoode1974.
- Grant, Frederick Dent. "Ulysses S. Grant and His Horses During and After the Civil War". Archived from the original on 2011-07-19.
- Freed, Benjamin R. (2012-10-04). "D.C. Police Once Gave the President a Speeding Ticket". DCist. Gothamist. Archived from the original on July 1, 2019.
- Grant, Ulysses S. (1892). Personal memoirs of U. S. Grant, Vol I. New York, NY : Charles L. Webster & Company.
- Grant, Ulysses S. (1892). Personal memoirs of U. S. Grant, Vol II. New York, NY : Charles L. Webster & Company.
- Headley, Phineas Camp (1866). The hero boy; or, The life and deeds of Lieut.-Gen. Grant. New York, W.H. Appleton.
- Headley, Phineas Camp (1869). The life and campaigns of General U. S. Grant : from boyhood to his inauguration as President of the United States. New York : George A. Leavitt.
- McClure, James Baird (1879). Stories, sketches and speeches of General Grant at home and abroad : in peace and in war. Chicago : Rhodes & McClure.
- McFeely, William S. (1981). Grant: A Biography. New York • London: W. W. Norton & Company. ISBN 0-393-01372-3.
- Richardson, Albert Deane (1868). A personal history of Ulysses S. Grant. Hartford, Conn.: American publishing company.
- Rosenwald, Michael S. (2018-12-16). "The police officer who arrested a president". The Washington Post.
- Simpson, Brooks D. (2014) [2000]. Ulysses S. Grant: Triumph Over Adversity, 1822–1865. Boston, MA: Houghton Mifflin. ISBN 978-0-395-65994-6.
- Smith, Jean Edward (2001). Grant. New York: Simon & Schuster. ISBN 0-684-84927-5.
- "Only Policeman Who Ever Arrested a President". The Sunday Star. Washington, D.C. 27 September 1908. Pt. 4, p. 2 – via Chronicling America.
- White, Ronald C. (2016). American Ulysses: A Life of Ulysses S. Grant. Random House Publishing Group. ISBN 978-1-58836-992-5.
- "Grant the Equestrian". The Ulysses S. Grant Homepage. 2006.
