= Arrest of Dominic Hall and Louis Louaillier =

Incident in the War of 1812

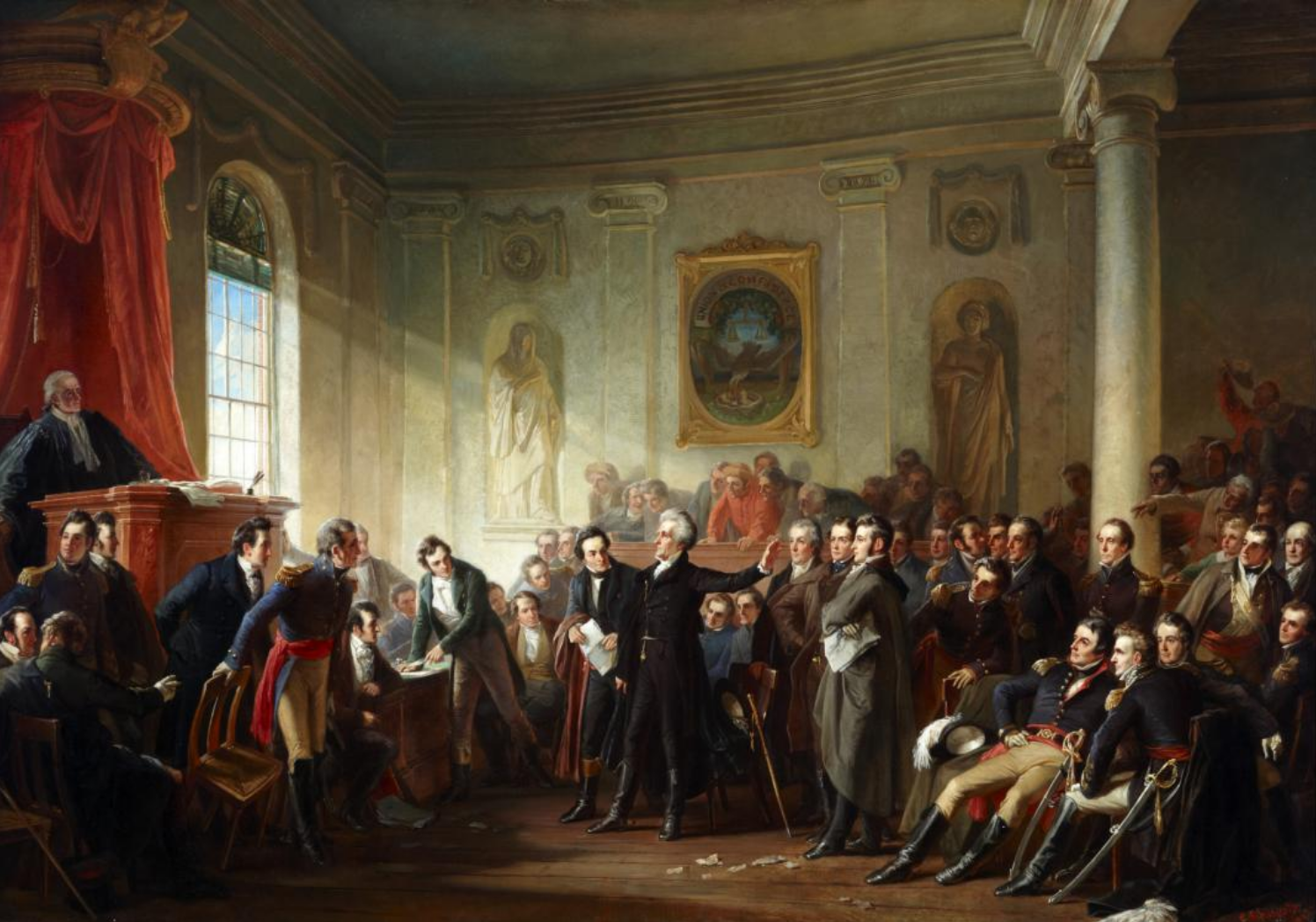
Andrew Jackson before Judge Hall in Louisiana for questioning regarding his actions instituting martial law in New Orleans

Dominic Augustin Hall and Louis Louaillier were American political figures who were ordered detained during the War of 1812 under the order of Major General Andrew Jackson in 1815. Hall later put Jackson under investigation and oversaw the trial that led to Jackson being fined.

== Background ==
Upon entering New Orleans in December 1814, Major General Andrew Jackson declared martial law to establish control of the city to defend it from British forces. It was the first such declaration in United States history.

== Louisiana Courier article by Louis Louaillier ==
On March 3, 1815, Louisiana State Senator Louis Louaillier wrote an anonymous article in the Louisiana Courier criticizing Andrew Jackson's declaration of martial law and his refusal to release the militia after the British ceded the field of battle. Two days after the article appeared, Louaillier admitted to writing the article, and Jackson ordered Louaillier's arrest.

U.S. District Court Judge Dominic A. Hall signed a writ of habeas corpus on behalf of Louaillier, and Jackson subsequently ordered Hall's arrest as well.

Jackson did not relent his campaign of suppressing dissent until after ordering the arrests of Louaillier, Hall, and John Dick (a lawyer) and after intervention of State Judge Joshua Lewis. Lewis was simultaneously serving under Jackson in the militia, and also signed a separate writ of habeas corpus against Jackson, his commanding officer, seeking Judge Hall's release.

Jackson proceeded with a court-martial of Louaillier. Louaillier was later exonerated, but Jackson did not release him from jail. Jackson then released Hall and escorted him beyond the city limits, outside the zone of martial law. Jackson told Hall not to return until the war had officially ended.

Just two days later, Jackson received official word of the Treaty of Ghent and immediately lifted martial law and released all prisoners.

== Trial and fine of Andrew Jackson ==
Hall later ordered an investigation of Jackson's actions in New Orleans, and Jackson was brought before the court, overseen by Hall, and was subsequently fined $1,000 for contempt of court, which he paid in full. Jackson's fine was later paid back to him by Congress, with interest, in 1844, to around $2,700.

== See also ==
- Legal affairs of Andrew Jackson
