= Boris Bakhmeteff =

Russian diplomat (1880–1951)

- Борис Бахметев
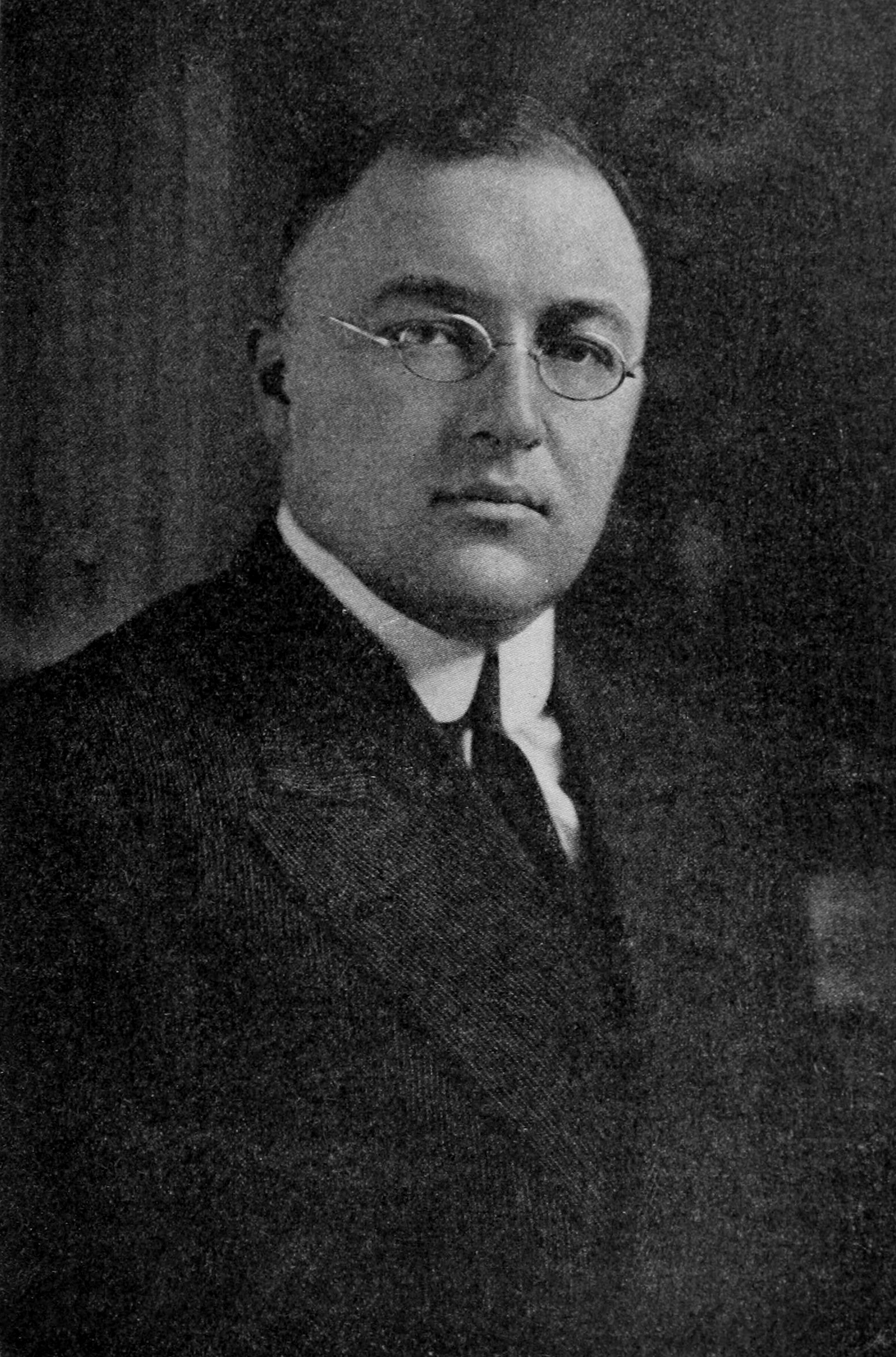
- Bakhmeteff in 1918

Russian Ambassador to the United States
- In office 1917
- Preceded by: George Bakhmeteff
- Succeeded by: Maxim Litvinov

Personal details
- Born: May 14, 1880 Tbilisi, Russian Empire
- Died: July 21, 1951 (aged 71) Brookfield, Connecticut, U.S.
- Party: Russian Social Democratic Labour Party (Mensheviks)
- Spouse(s): Helen Bakhmeteff (m. 1905; died 1921) Marie C. Cole (m. 1938)
- Awards: Norman Medal (1947)

Boris Alexandrovich Bakhmeteff (Russian: Борис Александрович Бахметев) (also spelled Bakhmetieff or Bakhmetev) (May 14, 1880 – July 21, 1951) was an engineer, businessman, professor of civil engineering at Columbia University and the only ambassador of the Russian Provisional Government to the United States. He was unrelated to his predecessor as ambassador, George Bakhmeteff.

== Biography ==
He was born on May 14, 1880, in Tbilisi, Georgia. He married Helen on July 22, 1905, in Kineshma, Russia.

His wife Helen died on July 24, 1921.

He became a member of the Menshevik faction of the Russian Social Democratic Labour Party in 1906.

His position as ambassador was recognized by the United States government until his resignation in June 1922, when he established the Lion Match Company with other Russian immigrants. At his request the role of representative of Russia was transferred to his assistant Serge Ughet, financial attaché of the embassy, who held this position until United States recognition of the Soviet Union in 1933.

He introduced the concept of specific energy in hydraulics in his thesis and book Hydraulics of Open Channels in 1932.

He married Marie C. Cole in 1938 in Duval County, Florida.

In 1947 he received the Norman Medal of the American Society of Civil Engineers.

He died on July 21, 1951, in Brookfield, Connecticut, of a heart attack.

== Legacy ==
The Russian archives and a professorship of Russian at Columbia are named after him, as is a Harvard research fellowship in hydraulics.

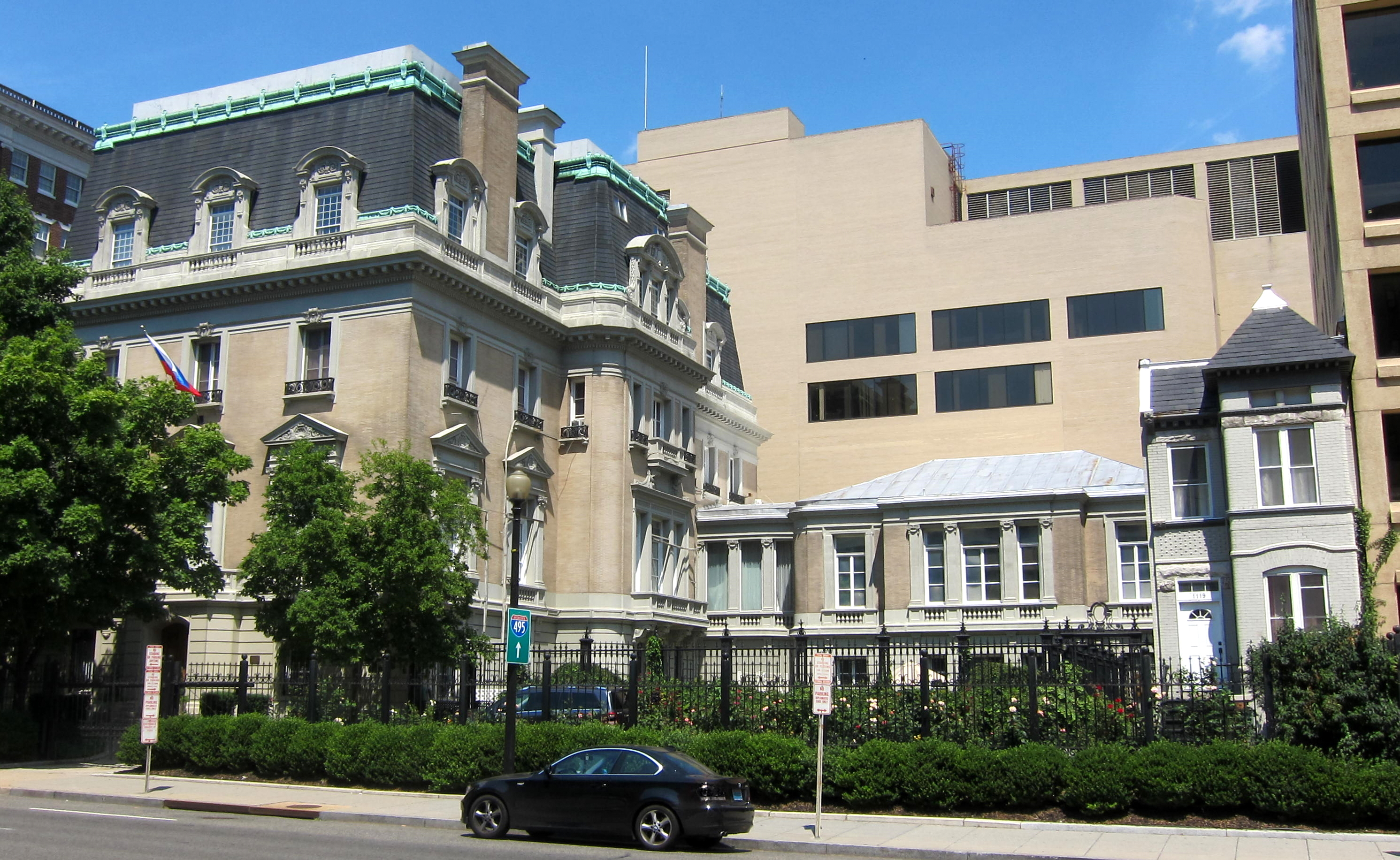
Bakhmeteff's former residence in Washington, D.C.

Boris Bakhmeteff was also on the Board of Directors for the Tolstoy Foundation Center in Valley Cottage, New York.

== Works ==
- Boris Aleksandrovich Bakhmateff, Hydraulics of Open Channels (New York: McGraw-Hill, 1932)
- Boris Aleksandrovich Bakhmateff, The Mechanics of Turbulent Flow (Princeton: Princeton Univ. Press, 1941)
