= United States District Court for the District of Orleans =

Former court for Territory of Orleans

- Defunct
- Location: New Orleans
- Established: October 1, 1804
- Abolished: April 30, 1812

The United States District Court for the District of Orleans was a United States district court created by the United States Congress on October 1, 1804 to resolve disputes in the Territory of Orleans, the portion of the Louisiana Purchase lands south of the 33rd parallel.

This act organized the Territory of Orleans as a judicial district and authorized one judgeship for the court. This was one of only two times the Congress provided a territory with a district court equal in its authority and jurisdiction to the district courts in the states; the other was when a court was created in Puerto Rico in 1966. The district court in Orleans, not being assigned to a judicial circuit, was granted the same jurisdiction as United States circuit courts, except in appeals and writs of error, which were the jurisdiction of the Supreme Court of the United States.

Only one person—Dominic Augustin Hall—served as a judge on the court. Hall was nominated to the Court by President Thomas Jefferson on November 30, 1804, and was confirmed by the United States Senate on that date, receiving his commission on December 11, 1804.

The court was abolished on April 8, 1812, which organized the State of Louisiana as a judicial district. Hall's service was thereby terminated, but shortly thereafter, on May 27, 1812, he was successfully nominated by President James Madison to be a judge on the United States District Court for the District of Louisiana.

== Former judge ==
| # | Judge | Born–died | Active service | Chief Judge | Senior status | Appointed by | Reason for termination |
|---|---|---|---|---|---|---|---|
| 1 | Dominic Augustin Hall | 1765–1820 | 1804–1812 | — | — | Jefferson | seat abolished |

== Succession of seats ==
Seat 1
Seat established on October 1, 1804 by 2 Stat. 283
| Hall | 1804–1812 |
Seat abolished on April 30, 1812 by 2 Stat. 701

== See also ==
- Courts of Louisiana
