= George Bakhmeteff =

Russian diplomat (1847–1928)

- Георгий Бахметев
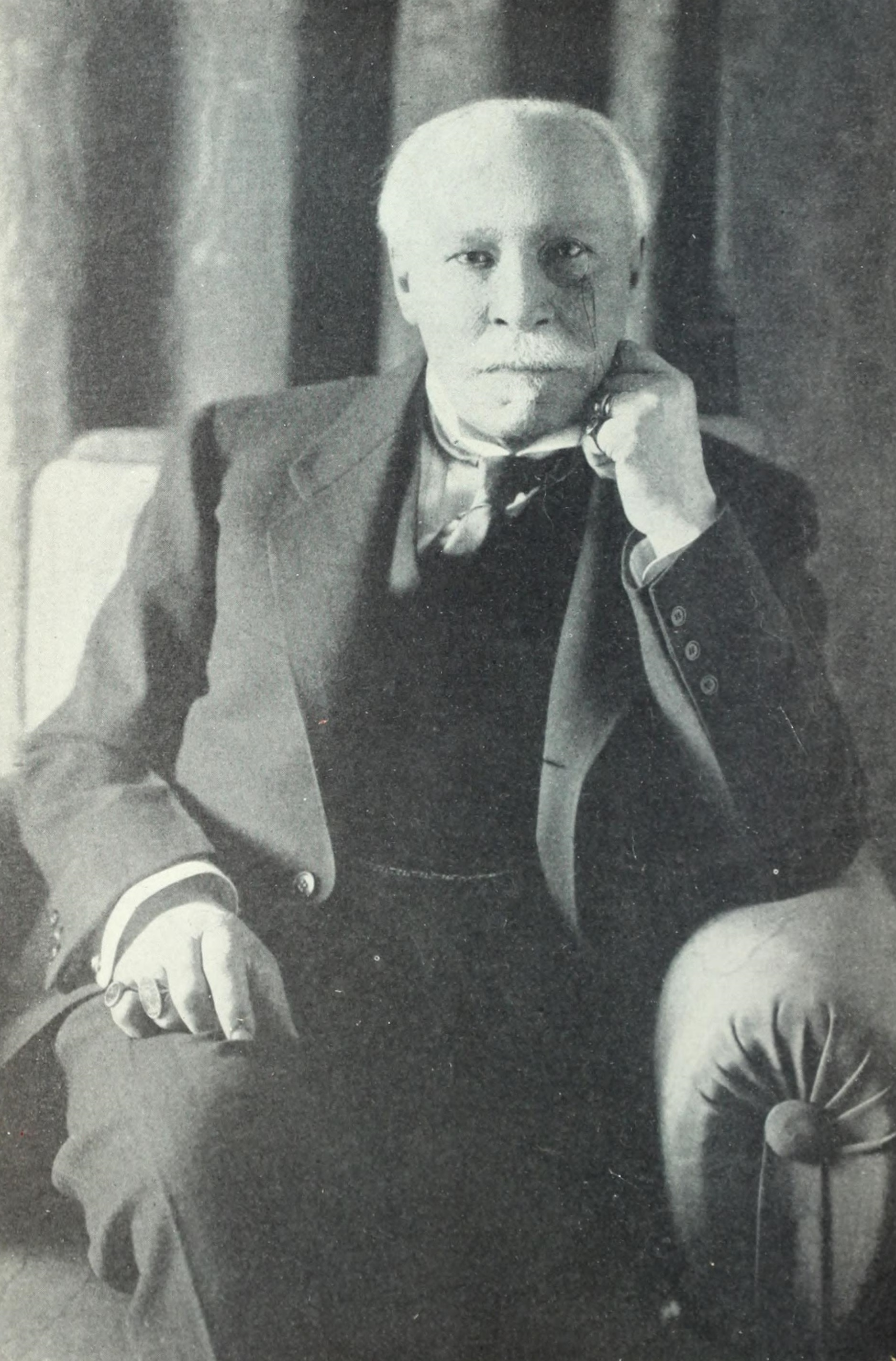
- Bakhmeteff in 1912

Russian Ambassador to the United States
- In office 1911–1917
- Preceded by: Roman Rosen
- Succeeded by: Boris Bakhmeteff

Russian Ambassador to Japan
- In office 1906–1908
- Preceded by: Roman Rosen
- Succeeded by: Nikolai Malevsky-Malevich

Russian Ambassador to Bulgaria
- In office 1897–1905
- Preceded by: Nikolai Charykov
- Succeeded by: Andrey Shcheglov

Personal details
- Born: 1847
- Died: 29 August 1928 (aged 80–81) Paris, France
- Spouse: Mary Beale

George Petrovich Bakhmeteff (Russian: Георгий Петрович Бахметев; 1847 – 29 August 1928) was the last Imperial Russian Ambassador to the United States. He served in office between 1911 and 1917.

== Origins ==
He was a career diplomat. Generations of the Bakhmeteff nobility had served under the Czars within the military and civil service. Previous to his service for Russia in Washington he had served as the Russian Ambassador to Japan.

== Personal life ==
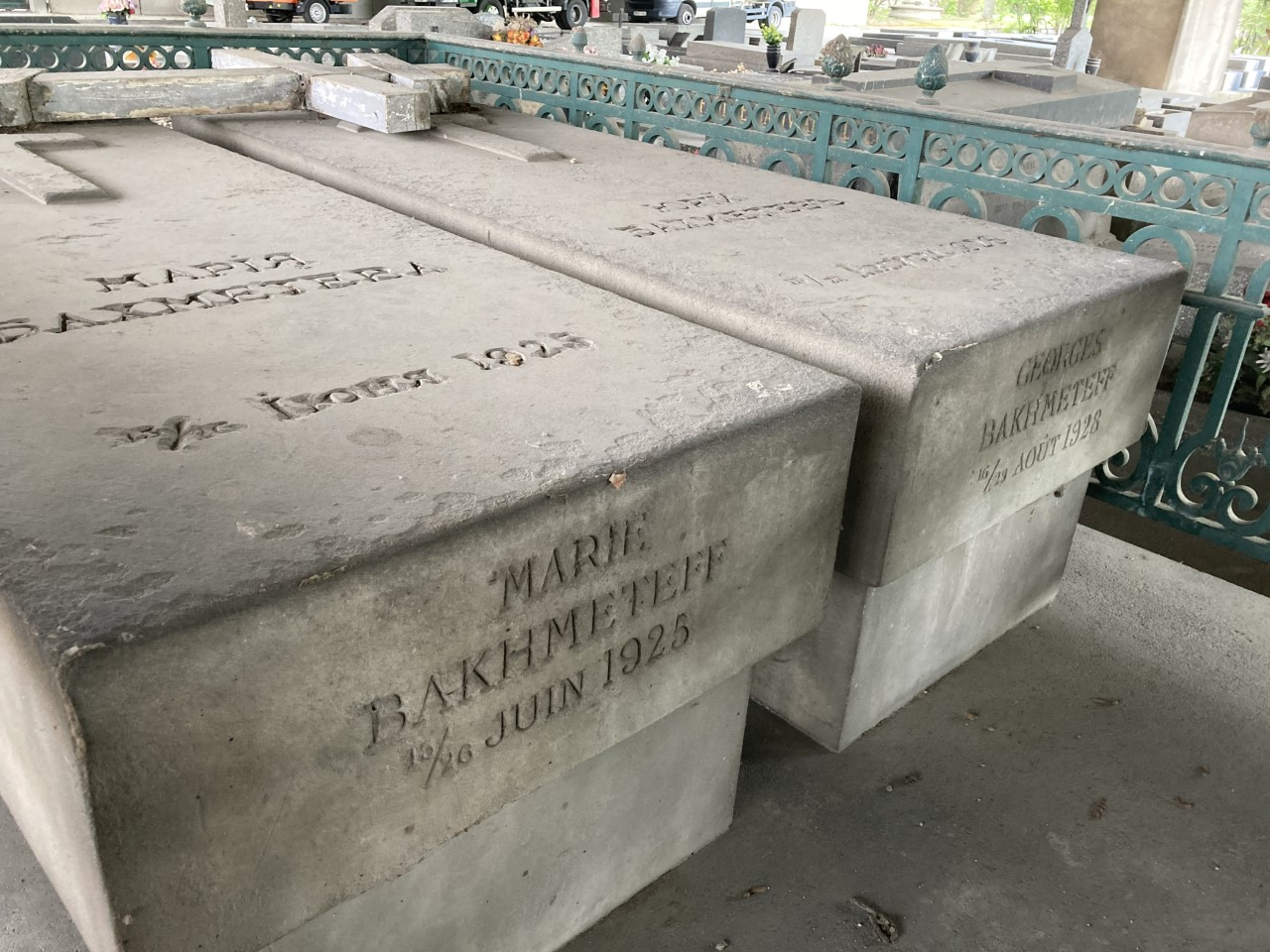
Grave of Bakhmeteff in Batignolles Cemetery.

He was married to Mary Beale, the daughter of a popular Washington social couple Ambassador and Mrs. Edward Fitzgerald Beale. The Beales were the owners of Decatur House in Washington and Tejon Ranch. His brother in law was American Ambassador to the Balkans Truxtun Beale. His sister in law was Emily Beale McLean who was married to John Roll McLean publisher of the Washington Post. George Bakhmeteff was succeeded as ambassador by another Bakhmeteff; Boris Bakhmeteff who was not closely related.

He died on 29 August 1928 in Paris, probably at the Hôtel de Besenval, where he still resided in the second half of the 1920s.
