= Presidential immunity in the United States =

U.S. political and legal concept

Presidential immunity is the concept that sitting presidents of the United States have civil or criminal immunity for their official acts. (Note: Civil and criminal proceedings against a president are distinct from impeachment or removal from office, which are a purely political matter.) Neither civil nor criminal immunity is explicitly granted in the Constitution or any federal statute. However, the Supreme Court of the United States ruled in Trump v. United States (2024) that all presidents have absolute criminal immunity for official acts under core constitutional powers, presumptive immunity for other official acts. The court held that there is no immunity for unofficial acts. The court made this decision after former President Trump claimed immunity from prosecution for actions performed within the perimeter of his responsibilities as president.

Previously, the Supreme Court had found in Nixon v. Fitzgerald (1982) that the president has absolute immunity from civil damages actions regarding conduct within the "outer perimeter" of their duties. However, in Clinton v. Jones (1997), the court ruled against temporary immunity for sitting presidents from suits arising from pre-presidency conduct. Some scholars suggested an immunity from arrest and criminal prosecution as well, a view which became the practice of the Department of Justice under a pair of memoranda (1973 and 2000) from the Office of Legal Counsel. Presidents Richard Nixon, Bill Clinton, and Donald Trump were criminally investigated while in office, but none were prosecuted while still in office. (Note: Trump was arrested four times in 2023, two years after leaving office.)

== Civil immunity ==
=== Background ===
The Constitution of the United States grants legislative immunity to members of Congress through the Speech or Debate Clause, but has no explicit comparable grant for the president. Early American politicians, including those at the Constitutional Convention, were divided as to whether such immunity should exist. However, courts historically found that the president had absolute immunity from any personal damage liability for acts undertaken in the course of his duties. The first suit brought directly against a president was Mississippi v. Johnson (1867), in which the Supreme Court of the United States ruled Andrew Johnson could not be sued as the actions in question were discretionary. Spalding v. Vilas (1896) affirmed that federal cabinet officers had absolute immunity for actions "more or less" within the scope of their duties; Barr v. Matteo (1959) extended this to all federal executive officials.

=== Suits against Nixon ===
No court was willing to assert jurisdiction over the president until the D.C. District Court did so over Richard Nixon in Minnesota Chippewa Tribe v. Carlucci (1973). After the D.C. Circuit Court of Appeals entered a declaratory judgment against Nixon in National Treasury Employees Union v. Nixon (1974) and contemplated the possibility of a writ of mandamus against him, a wave of suits directly against Nixon began. In 1978, in Butz v. Economou, the U.S. Supreme Court held that in a constitutional cause of action (as allowed in Bivens v. Six Unknown Named Agents [1971]), Spalding and Barr (which were about common law causes of action) did not control, and federal executive officials were entitled only to qualified immunity, not absolute. The next year in Halperin v. Kissinger, the D.C. Circuit extended that logic to Nixon, who had by then resigned.

In 1978, whistleblower A. Ernest Fitzgerald added former president Nixon to his suit against several officials involved in his firing from the Department of the Air Force. This resulted in the collateral appeal Nixon v. Fitzgerald (1982), in which the U.S. Supreme Court ruled that a former or current president was absolutely immune from suit regarding acts within the "outer perimeter" of his duties, citing the president's "unique status under the Constitution". A four-justice dissent objected to a scope that included willful violations of the Constitution and would have given immunity only to certain functions of the presidency.

=== Clinton v. Jones ===
Paula Jones sued Bill Clinton in 1994 for several counts related to allegedly sexually harassing her when he was governor of Arkansas. Clinton, by then the president, sought both to dismiss the case with prejudice on the basis of immunity and to toll the statute of limitations for the duration of his presidency. The court declined to dismiss, but stayed the trial until Clinton's presidency ended. The Eighth Circuit affirmed, and in Clinton v. Jones the U.S. Supreme Court in turn affirmed the Eighth Circuit, holding that presidential immunity generally does not extend to lawsuits over matters that predate the president taking office.

=== Cases against Trump ===
The several civil cases against Trump in the district and appeals courts in Washington, D.C. for his role in the violence of January 6, 2021, are pending and will likely influence the criminal cases elsewhere. The appeals court panel ruled on December 1, 2023, that the district trial court was correct in dismissing the broad presidential immunity claims made by Trump, but implied that the former president might argue that he was acting in an official capacity when he addressed the protest crowd.

== Criminal immunity ==
=== Constitutional provisions ===
Article II, Section 4 provides for which crimes the President shall be removed from office by impeachment in the House and conviction in the Senate. Article I, Section 3, Clause 7 specifies that a President impeached by the House and convicted by the Senate is nevertheless "liable and subject to Indictment, Trial, Judgment and Punishment according to Law."

=== Background ===
A number of sources have repeated a claim that Ulysses S. Grant was arrested in office in 1872, and this has been cited in the context of presidential immunity. While the Metropolitan Police Department of the District of Columbia has appeared to confirm this narrative, there does not seem to be any contemporaneous documentation of it, which has caused the Ulysses S. Grant National Historic Site to question its historical accuracy. A similar claim regarding Franklin Pierce has been dismissed as apocryphal by Pierce scholar Peter Wallner.

Two vice presidents have been indicted: Aaron Burr in New York and New Jersey for killing Alexander Hamilton in a duel; and Spiro Agnew, who pleaded no contest to several offenses at the moment of his resignation. However, the same arguments have not been made for vice presidential immunity as for presidential.

=== OLC memoranda ===
1973 OLC memoranda

In 1973, amid the Watergate scandal, the Department of Justice's Office of Legal Counsel (OLC) issued a memorandum concluding that it is unconstitutional to prosecute a sitting president. Its arguments include that the president "is the symbolic head of the Nation. To wound him by a criminal proceeding is to hamstring the operation of the whole governmental apparatus in both foreign and domestic affairs." It says that the statute of limitations should not be tolled while the president is in office, but suggests that Congress could extend the statute of limitations specifically for presidents. After the U.S. Supreme Court's decision in Clinton, the OLC issued a second memorandum in 2000, distinguishing civil and criminal presidential immunity and determining that it was still improper to prosecute a president due to the adverse affect it might have on his ability to govern.

Neither memorandum has force of law, but both are binding within the Department of Justice. Because they were not promulgated with room for public comment, they do not qualify as administrative law either; rather, they are an internal prosecutorial policy. The memoranda are not taken to bar investigating the president or even announcing a determination that the president has broken the law, as Nixon, Clinton, and Donald Trump have all been subject to criminal investigations while in office.

=== Special counsel determinations and further debate ===
The staff of Leon Jaworski, the special counsel investigating Watergate, wrote an internal memorandum in 1974 concluding that Jaworski could indict Nixon, then the sitting president. Jaworski later argued the same in court, but ultimately deferred to Congress's impeachment powers. Nixon later resigned facing impeachment. In 1998, a consultant for Ken Starr, who as independent counsel was investigating Clinton, wrote a memorandum discussing the topic at greater length and reaching the same conclusion. Starr drafted an indictment of Clinton but never filed it, instead reporting to Congress, which impeached and later acquitted Clinton.

The question of presidential criminal immunity re-emerged during the presidency of Donald Trump and Robert Mueller's special counsel investigation. The Mueller report determined that Mueller was bound by the 1973 and 2000 OLC memoranda. Mueller found that he could investigate Trump, but concluded that, since he could not indict him and thereby give him the chance to defend himself, it would not be fair to label Trump's actions criminal.

Amidst the investigation, Laurence Tribe argued in The Boston Globe and Lawfare that it is constitutional to prosecute a sitting president, citing a hypothetical example of a president who blatantly murders someone. Philip Bobbitt in Lawfare respectfully disagreed with Tribe, in particular his logic that any president indicted after an impeachment will be pardoned by his successor (as with Gerald Ford and Richard Nixon). Walter Dellinger argued that a sitting president cannot be put on trial but can still be indicted.

Saikrishna Bangalore Prakash compares the OLC's reasoning to that of an "unabashed monarchist". He observes a number of problems with presidential immunity from prosecution, including the question of tolling the statute of limitations. Akhil Reed Amar and Brian C. Kalt see tolling as a potential solution to the problem. Kim Wehle has criticized the OLC memoranda at length in The Atlantic and Stanford Law & Policy Review, highlighting that they have no force of law and could be overturned by the attorney general at any time. Wehle goes as far as to say that, if necessary, federal courts should issue writs of mandamus forcing the Department of Justice to apply laws equally to the president, an extension of logic used by Judge Brett Kavanaugh in In re Aiken County (2011).

=== Donald Trump election obstruction case ===
During a January 9, 2024, hearing regarding Trump's 2020 election obstruction case, Trump's attorney, D. John Sauer, argued before a three-judge panel of the DC Circuit Court of Appeals that Trump enjoyed absolute immunity for any crimes he may have committed as president. Judge Florence Pan asked Sauer whether immunity would cover a sitting president who orders the assassination of a political opponent. Sauer responded that prosecution could only start after a successful impeachment conviction; Pan replied that the response did not answer her question. The three judges questioned the contention that impeachment and conviction by Congress was a prerequisite for any criminal prosecution. Pan asked Sauer how a defendant who claims "blanket" immunity can also plausibly and concurrently claim immunity conditioned on the President having been "impeached and convicted" by Congress: "Once you concede that presidents can be prosecuted under some circumstances, your separation of powers argument falls away, and the issues before us are narrowed to are you correct in your interpretation of the impeachment judgment clause?" On February 6, a federal appeals court dismissed Trump's assertion of absolute immunity from criminal charges during his tenure as president. On March 6, the Supreme Court set a date of April 25 for its consideration of the criminal immunity argument related to former President Trump’s claim of presidential immunity.

The U.S. Supreme Court ruled on Donald Trump's eligibility to appear on the 2024 presidential primary ballot, finding that the former U.S. president is eligible to participate in the primary. Specifically, with respect to the Insurrection Clause, the Court confirmed that states can only restrict the eligibility of state officials and do not have the authority to enforce Section 3 as it relates to the office of the President, which is a federal office.

The Supreme Court heard oral arguments regarding Trump's assertion of absolute immunity on April 25. Trump attorneys cited the 1982 Nixon v. Fitzgerald civil suit which found in a 5–4 decision that a president "is entitled to absolute immunity from damages liability predicated on his official acts" and "the President's absolute immunity extends to all acts within the 'outer perimeter' of his duties of office." Attorneys for the Smith special counsel investigation that was prosecuting Trump cited United States v. Nixon, the 1974 unanimous Supreme Court decision rejecting Nixon's claim of "absolute, unqualified Presidential privilege of immunity from judicial process under all circumstances." Smith attorneys argued the Fitzgerald precedent, which found presidents enjoy absolute immunity from civil suits, does not apply to federal criminal prosecutions.

On July 1, 2024, the Supreme Court ruled in Trump v. United States that presidents have absolute immunity from criminal prosecution for those official acts which fall within their "exclusive sphere of constitutional authority". For those official acts that do not fall within this inner core, but nevertheless within "the outer perimeter of his official responsibility", a president enjoys at least a presumptive immunity. When it comes to unofficial acts, there is no immunity. The case was returned to the lower courts to determine whether Trump's actions related to the January 6, 2021, attacks on the U.S. Capitol were official or not, and if so, then to which degree of immunity they would be entitled.

== See also ==
- Judicial immunity
