= Louis Louaillier =

Former Louisiana state representative

Louis Louaillier (also recorded as Louis Louallier) was a French-born American politician who represented Opelousas County in the Louisiana House of Representatives. On March 5, 1815, after the Battle of New Orleans, Major General Andrew Jackson had Louaillier arrested for publishing an article criticizing an order Jackson had issued under martial law. A military court acquitted Louaillier of spying, and Jackson held him until official confirmation of the Treaty of Ghent reached New Orleans on March 13.

== Legislative career ==
Louaillier was born in France and eventually became a naturalized U.S. citizen while living in Opelousas County. Opelousas was one of the 12 counties the Territory of Orleans established in 1805. It continued to serve as a legislative district after the territory formed St. Landry Parish within it in 1807. Louaillier was a representative for Opelousas in 1812 and in the second and third sessions in 1814.

As chair of the House Ways and Means Committee in 1814, Louaillier urged the legislature to raise money to defend New Orleans during the War of 1812. Acting on his motion, lawmakers set aside $2,000 for militia members, sailors, and people of color serving the United States. Louaillier also chaired a committee that considered a proposal to suspend habeas corpus so the navy could impress sailors. The committee recommended offering bounties to volunteers, and the legislature declined to suspend the writ.

== Arrest and court-martial ==
Jackson kept New Orleans under martial law after the British defeat in January 1815. In late February, he ordered residents who had obtained certificates of French nationality to leave the city. Louaillier responded in an anonymous article published March 3 in the Courrier de la Louisiane. He defended the role French residents had played in the city's defense and called for civil law to be restored.

An army captain arrested Louaillier on Jackson's orders on March 5. Louaillier's lawyer, Pierre L. Morel, obtained a writ of habeas corpus from U.S. District Judge Dominic Augustin Hall. Jackson refused to comply with the writ and ordered Hall's arrest.

Louaillier challenged the court-martial's authority to try him as a civilian. The court declined jurisdiction over most charges, including mutiny, and acquitted him of spying. Jackson kept Louaillier in custody after the acquittal. On March 13, official confirmation of peace with Britain arrived, and Jackson lifted martial law and released Louaillier. Hall later fined Jackson $1,000 for contempt of court.

== Later life ==
During Jackson's campaign for the presidency, Louaillier published The Appeal of L. Louaillier, Sen., against the Charge of High Treason, and Explaining the Transactions at New-Orleans (1827). The pamphlet defended his conduct in 1815 and criticized Jackson.

Louaillier supported the Academy of the Sacred Heart in Grand Coteau, Louisiana, where one of his children attended school. In 1829 he advised Mother Xavier to seek help from Jackson, whose niece also attended the academy, in raising money for a building addition.
