= Edward Fitzgerald Beale =

American explorer, surveyor, ambassador (1822–1893)

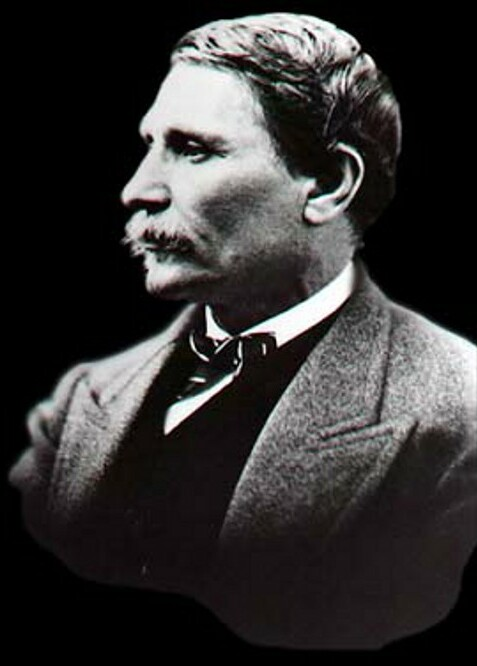

9th United States Minister to Austria-Hungary
- In office June 1, 1876 – April 20, 1877
- President: Ulysses S. Grant
- Preceded by: Godlove S. Orth
- Succeeded by: John A. Kasson

Surveyor General of California and Nevada
- In office 1861
- President: Abraham Lincoln

Superintendent of Indian Affairs for California and Nevada
- In office 1853–1856
- President: Millard Fillmore

Personal details
- Born: February 4, 1822 Washington, D.C., U.S.
- Died: April 22, 1893 (aged 71) Washington, D.C., U.S.
- Spouse: Mary Edwards (m. 1849)
- Children: 3, including Truxtun
- Relatives: Samuel Edwards (father-in-law); John R. McLean (son-in-law); George Bakhmeteff (son-in-law)
- Education: Naval School

Military service
- Allegiance: United States
- Branch/service: United States Navy
- Years of service: 1837–1851
- Rank: Lieutenant (navy)

Edward Fitzgerald Beale (February 4, 1822 – April 22, 1893) was an American naval officer, frontiersman, rancher and diplomat. He fought in the Mexican–American War, emerging as a hero of the Battle of San Pasqual in 1846. He achieved national fame in 1848 in carrying to the east the first gold samples from California, contributing to the gold rush.

In the late 1850s, Beale surveyed and built Beale's Wagon Road, which many settlers used to move to the West, and which became part of Route 66 and the route for the Transcontinental railroad. As California's first Superintendent of Indian Affairs, Beale helped charter a humanitarian policy towards Native Americans in the 1850s. He also founded the Tejon Ranch, the largest private landholding in California, and became a millionaire several times over. He received appointments from five U.S. presidents: Andrew Jackson appointed him to the Philadelphia Naval School, Millard Fillmore appointed him Superintendent of Indian Affairs for California and Nevada, James Buchanan appointed him to survey a wagon road from New Mexico to California, Abraham Lincoln appointed him Surveyor General of California and Nevada, and Ulysses S. Grant appointed him Ambassador to Austria-Hungary. He was a friend of Kit Carson, Buffalo Bill Cody and Ulysses S. Grant.

"Beale successfully pursued a personal El Dorado of adventure, status, and wealth," wrote Gerald Thompson. "In doing so, he mirrored the dreams of countless Americans of his day."

== Early life and education ==
Beale was born in Washington, D.C. His father, George Beale, was a paymaster in the U.S. Navy who earned a Congressional Medal for Valor in the War of 1812. His mother, Emily, was the daughter of Commodore Thomas Truxtun of the U.S. Navy. Ned was a student at Georgetown University when, at the solicitation of his widowed mother, President Andrew Jackson appointed him to the Philadelphia Naval School.

== Career ==
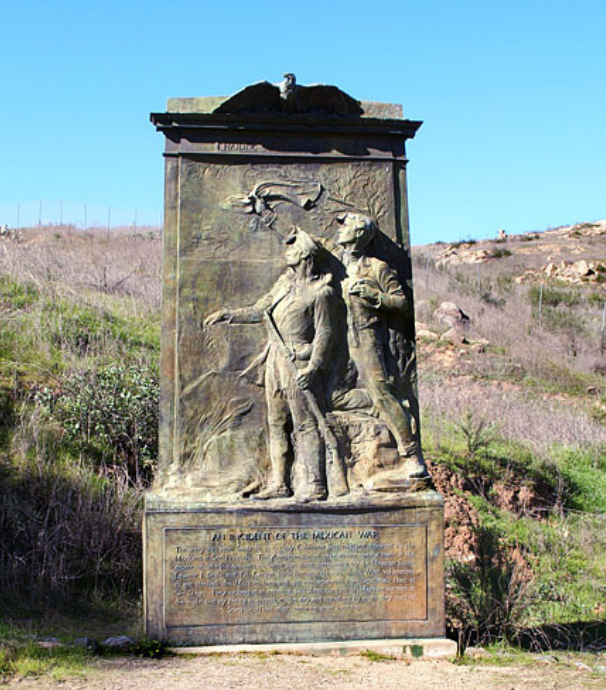
The San Pasqual Battlefield Monument, in San Diego, California, commemorates Beale and Carson's participation in the Battle of San Pasqual, during the U.S. Conquest of California.

From 1837 to 1842, Beale was an acting midshipman on naval ships that sailed to Russia, Brazil and the West Indies. He graduated from the Naval School as a midshipman in 1842, and sailed for two years in Europe and South America. In 1845, he was assigned to the squadron of Captain Robert F. Stockton, a wealthy New Jersey businessman and inventor as well as a career naval officer, who was an intimate of presidents. Beale sailed with Stockton's squadron to Texas, where Stockton met with the Texas Congress, which accepted annexation by the United States.

After a promotion to acting master and private secretary to Stockton, Beale sailed for California and Oregon in 1845 on the USS Congress, but 20 days later Stockton instructed Beale to board a Danish ship they had encountered and sail to England, where Beale was to disguise his identity and seek information on the British feelings on the Oregon boundary. Back in Washington, D.C., in 1846, Beale reported his findings to President James Polk that the British had been making warlike preparations. Promoted to the position of master, Beale carried packages for Navy Secretary Bancroft to Stockton, sailing to Panama, crossing the isthmus by boat and mule, and then sailing to Peru to meet up with Stockton and the Congress in 1846. He sailed with Stockton to Honolulu, and then to California. Hostilities with Mexico had already begun when the vessel reached Monterey, California on July 20, 1846.

After reaching San Diego, Stockton dispatched Beale to serve with the land forces. Beale and a small body of men under Lt. Archibald Gillespie joined General Stephen W. Kearny's column just before the Battle of San Pasqual on December 6, 1846. After the Mexican Army surrounded the small American force and threatened to destroy it, Beale and two other men (his Delaware Indian servant and Kit Carson) crept through the Mexican lines and made their way to San Diego for reinforcements. Two months later, although Beale still suffered from the effects of his adventure, Stockton again sent him east with dispatches. Beale reached Washington about June 1. In October he appeared as a defense witness for John C. Frémont at the "Pathfinder's" court martial.

Within the next two years, Beale made six more journeys across the country. On the second of these (July–September 1848), he crossed Mexico in disguise to bring the federal government proof of California's gold. After the fourth journey he married Pennsylvania Representative Samuel Edwards' daughter, Mary, on June 27, 1849. They had three children: Mary (1852–1925), who married Russian diplomat George Bakhmeteff, Emily (1854–1912), who married newspaper publisher John Roll McLean, and Truxtun (1856–1936).

Beale was promoted to lieutenant in 1850. He resigned from the Navy in 1851.

Over his lifetime, Beale saw San Francisco grow from an isolated village of five houses to a city of 300,000 residents.

After leaving the Navy, Beale returned to California as a manager for William Henry Aspinwall and Commodore Robert F. Stockton, who had acquired large properties there. In 1853, President Fillmore appointed Beale Superintendent of Indian Affairs for California and Nevada. Congress appropriated $250,000 to improve native conditions in Beale's district. On his way to California, Beale left Washington on May 6 with a party of 13 and surveyed a route across Colorado and Utah to Los Angeles, California, for a transcontinental railroad. He reached Los Angeles on August 22. Beale served as Superintendent until 1856. California Governor John Bigler appointed Beale a brigadier general in the California state militia to give Beale additional authority to negotiate peace treaties between the Native Americans and the U.S. Army.

In 1861, Beale was appointed by President Abraham Lincoln as Surveyor General of California and Nevada. He had an important passage named after him due to his widening of a cut used by the Butterfield Overland Mail, a stagecoach that operated mail between St. Louis, Missouri and San Francisco. In 1862, he dispatched a crew of Chinese workers to widen an 1858 cut, which also reduced the climb by 50 feet (15 m). Beale's Cut, as it was known, lasted as a transportation passage through the modern day Newhall Pass area until the construction of the Newhall Tunnel was completed in 1910. Still in existence today, Beale's Cut is no longer passable by automobiles. It is difficult to find today because it is fenced off and not close enough to the Sierra Highway to be easily seen.

== Beale's Wagon Road and Camel Corps ==
In 1857, President James Buchanan appointed Beale to survey and build a wagon road from Fort Defiance, Arizona to the Colorado River, on the border between Arizona and California. The survey also incorporated an experiment for the Army using camels, first proposed by Secretary of War Jefferson Davis four years earlier. Beale used camels from the Camel Corps imported from Tunis as pack animals during this expedition and on another in 1858 through 1859 to extend the road from Fort Smith, Arkansas to the Colorado River. His lead camel driver was Hi Jolly (Hadji Ali) a Greek-Syrian convert to Islam. The camels were capable of traveling for days without water, carried much heavier loads than mules, and could thrive on forage that mules wouldn't touch. But the camels scared horses and mules, and the Army declined to continue the experiment with camels. Nevertheless, the wagon road Beale built became a popular immigrant trail during the 1860s and 1870s, and it was this survey which marked out for the first time a practicable highway along the 35th parallel that has been used from that day to this. The general route of the Beale Wagon Road was followed by U.S. Route 66, the Santa Fe Railway, and Interstate 40.

Of this road, Beale wrote: "... It is the shortest (route) from our western frontier by 300 miles, being nearly directly west. It is the most level, our wagons only double-teaming once in the entire distance, and that at a short hill, and over a surface heretofore unbroken by wheels or trail on any kind. It is well-watered! Our greatest distance without water at any time being twenty miles ... It crosses the great desert (which must be crossed by any road to California) at its narrowest point."

"In opening this highway," wrote Gerald Thompson, "Beale joined the small group of explorers who left an enduring mark on the American West during the nineteenth century."

Portions of the original wagon road are still visible. Due to the notoriety of his use of camels, the route became known as the "Beale Camel Trail", and today is listed on the NRHP, as the Thirty-Fifth Parallel Route.

== Tejon Ranch ==
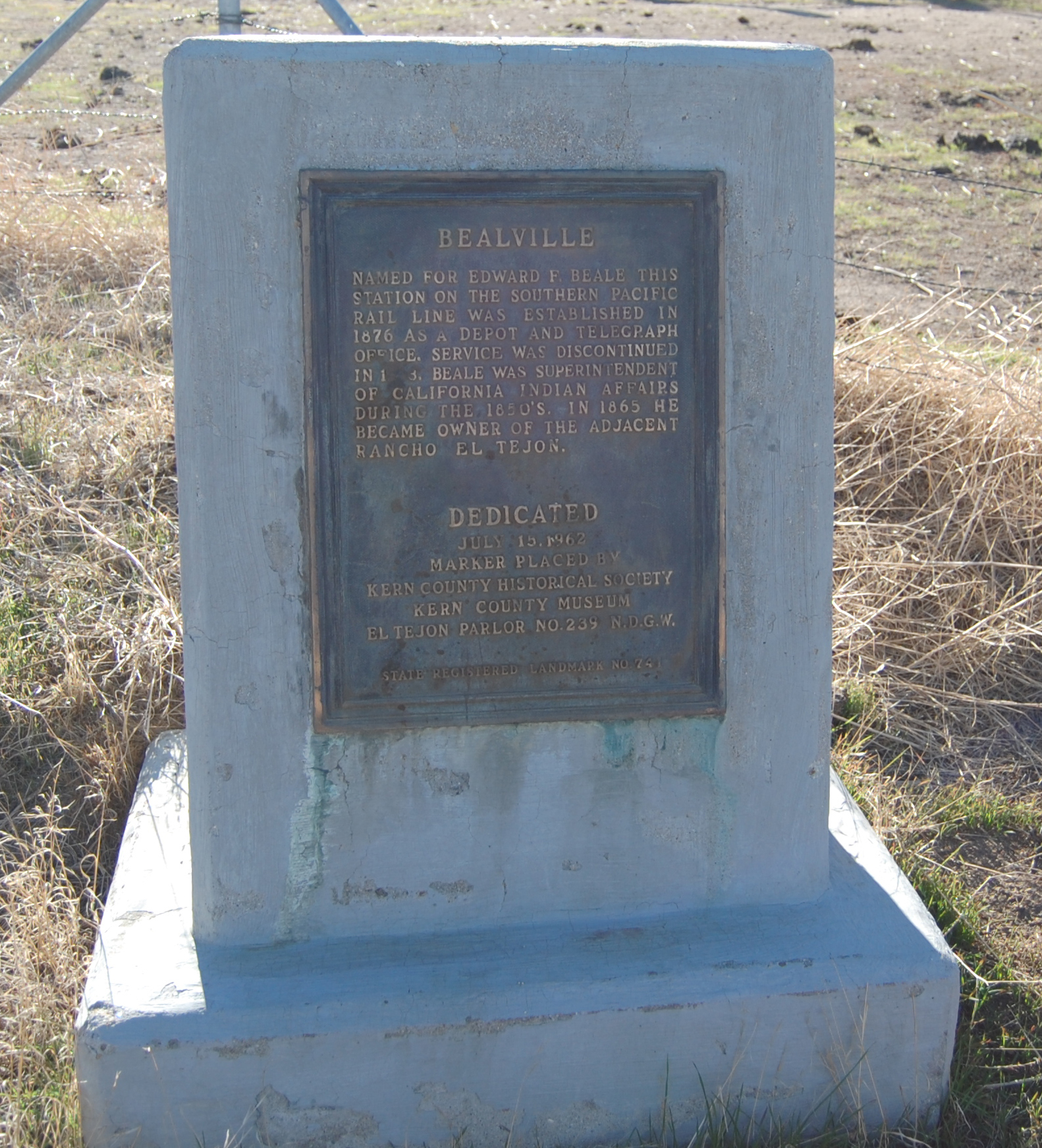
Bealville Historic marker along Caliente-Bodfish Road near Caliente, California.

At the urging of Beale, Fort Tejon was established by the U.S. Army in 1854, to protect and control the Indians who were living on the Sebastian Indian Reservation, and to protect both the Indians and white settlers from raids by the Paiutes, Chemehuevi, Mojave and other Indian groups of the desert regions to the east. Fort Tejon was abandoned in 1864. In 1865 and 1866, Beale purchased the Mexican land grants which now comprise the 270,000-acre (1,100 km^{2}) Tejon Ranch. When the U.S. Army sold its camels, Beale purchased some of them and kept them at his ranch. Tejon Ranch is the largest private landholding in California, and today is owned by Tejon Ranch Company, a company listed on the New York Stock Exchange (NYSE: TRC).

== Decatur House ==
In 1871, Beale purchased Decatur House, opposite the White House, in Washington, D.C. Decatur House had been built in 1818 for naval hero Stephen Decatur. Its prominent location across from the White House made Decatur House one of the capital's most desirable addresses and home of many of the nation's most prominent figures. The U.S. government rented Decatur House for its Secretaries of State, Henry Clay, Martin Van Buren and Judah P. Benjamin. Beale bought the house for $60,000 and extensively renovated it. He held many glittering parties there and became Washington's most famous host. A reporter from the Washington Capital wrote in 1873 that "the old Decatur mansion will again rank first among the fashionable residences of our city." Decatur House also became the unofficial meeting place for the Republican Stalwarts, and Ulysses S. Grant frequently stayed there. Beale's daughter-in-law, Marie, bequeathed Decatur House to the National Trust for Historic Preservation in 1956.

== Ambassador to Austria-Hungary ==
President Grant appointed Beale Ambassador to Austria-Hungary, in 1876. He served from 1876 to 1877, and displayed a talent for diplomacy. His lavish entertaining, tales of the American West, command of foreign languages, and warm personality made Beale and his wife popular figures in the Viennese court. His love of horses helped him win the trust of Emperor Franz Joseph I of Austria. During his tenure, Beale sent frequent dispatches to the State Department on the war between Turkey and Serbia and the Eastern Question.

== Retirement ==
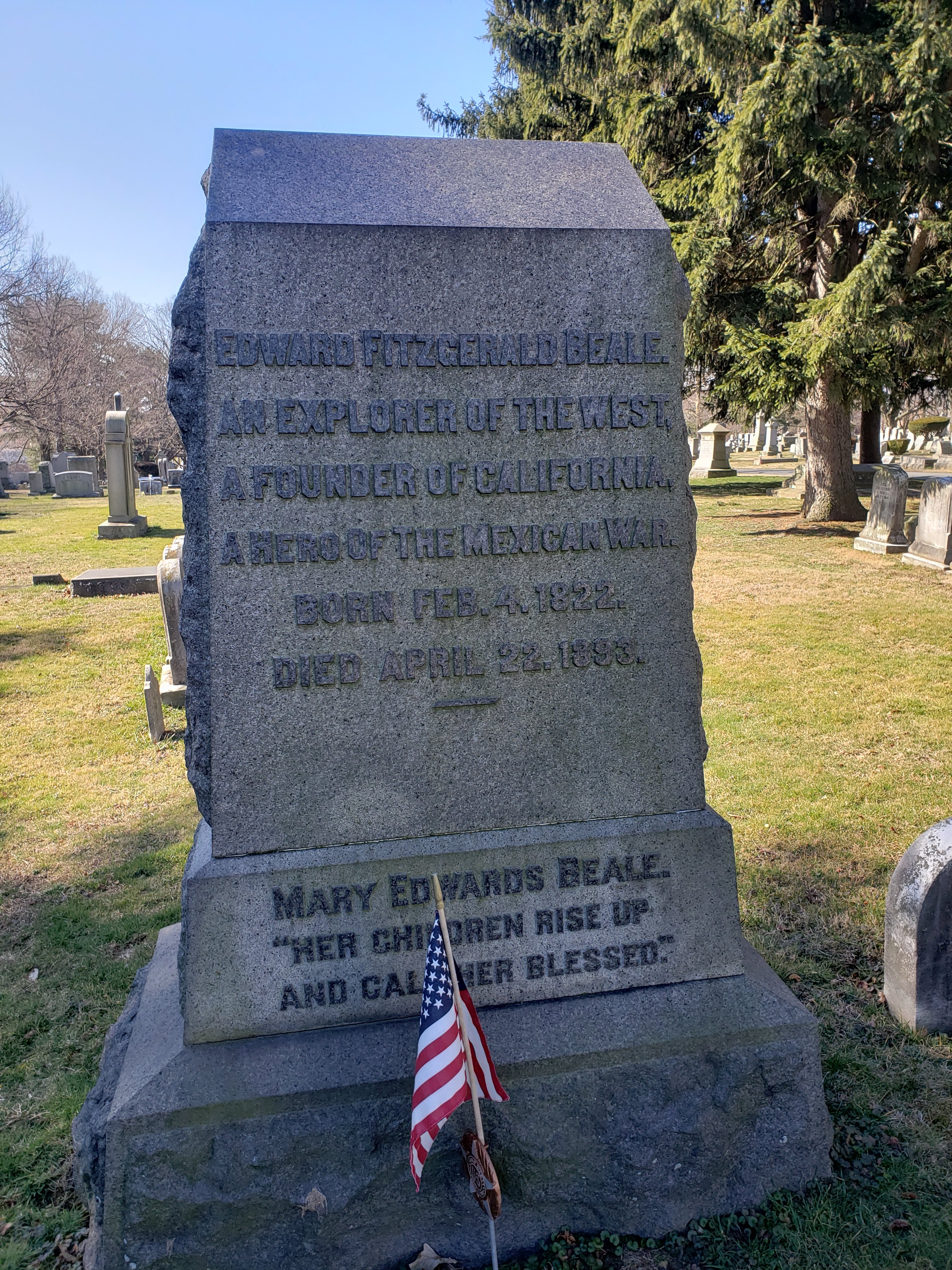
Edward Fitzgerald Beale gravestone in Chester Rural Cemetery

In his retirement, Beale lived at Decatur House in Washington, D.C., with yearly visits to Tejon Ranch and more frequent visits to his horse farm at Ash Hill in Hyattsville, Maryland, northeast of Washington, D.C. At Ash Hill he entertained friends such as Grant, who kept two Arabian horses stabled there, President Grover Cleveland and Buffalo Bill Cody. Ash Hill was listed on the National Register of Historic Places in 1977.

Beale died at Decatur House in 1893 and is interred at Chester Rural Cemetery in Chester, Pennsylvania. His will was witnessed by Ulysses S. Grant and General William Tecumseh Sherman.

== Legacy ==
His son Truxtun Beale was a diplomat to Persia, Greece, Romania and Serbia.

- Tejon Ranch, Bakersfield, California.
- Ash Hill, Hyattsville, Maryland
- Beale Air Force Base, a United States Air Force base in California.
- Beale Street in Memphis, Tennessee
- Beale Street (San Francisco)
- U.S. Route 66
- Beale Street and monument in Kingman, Arizona, and Beale's Springs nearby.
- Beale Memorial Library, Bakersfield, California.
- Beale Avenue, General Beale Road, and Truxtun Avenue (named for his son) in Bakersfield, California
- Beale Mountains in California.
- USS Beale (DD-40), a Paulding-class destroyer ship of the U.S. Navy.
- USS Beale (DD-471), a Fletcher-class destroyer ship of the U.S. Navy.

== In popular culture ==
The actor Stanley Lachman played Beale in two 1957 episodes, "The Camel Train" and "The California Gold Rush in Reverse" of the syndicated television anthology series, Death Valley Days, hosted by Stanley Andrews. In the former, Beale is instructed by Secretary of War Jefferson Davis, played by Harry Fleer, to conduct an experiment with the use of camels in the deserts of the American Southwest. William "Red" Reynolds (1927–1981) was cast as mountain man Kit Carson. In the second episode, Beale attempts to be the first to return East with a sample of newly discovered California gold, but he must escape Mexican bandits to do so.

Another actor, Charles Bateman, played Beale in another Death Valley Days episode, "Stubborn Mule Hill," which aired in 1963. In that episode, David McLean played Army scout Kit Carson.

Beale was played by Rod Cameron in the 1954 Western film Southwest Passage. As in "The Camel Train", Beale is conducting an experiment with camels in the American Southwest, whilst at the same time surveying a new route across the desert and mountains.

== See also ==
- Ridge Route - 1937 photograph of Beale's Cut
- Newhall Pass - Beale's Cut

Diplomatic posts
Preceded by Godlove S. Orth	U.S. Minister to Austria-Hungary; 1876 - 1877	Succeeded by John A. Kasson
