= Ash Hill (Maryland) =

Historic house in Maryland, US

- U.S. National Register of Historic Places
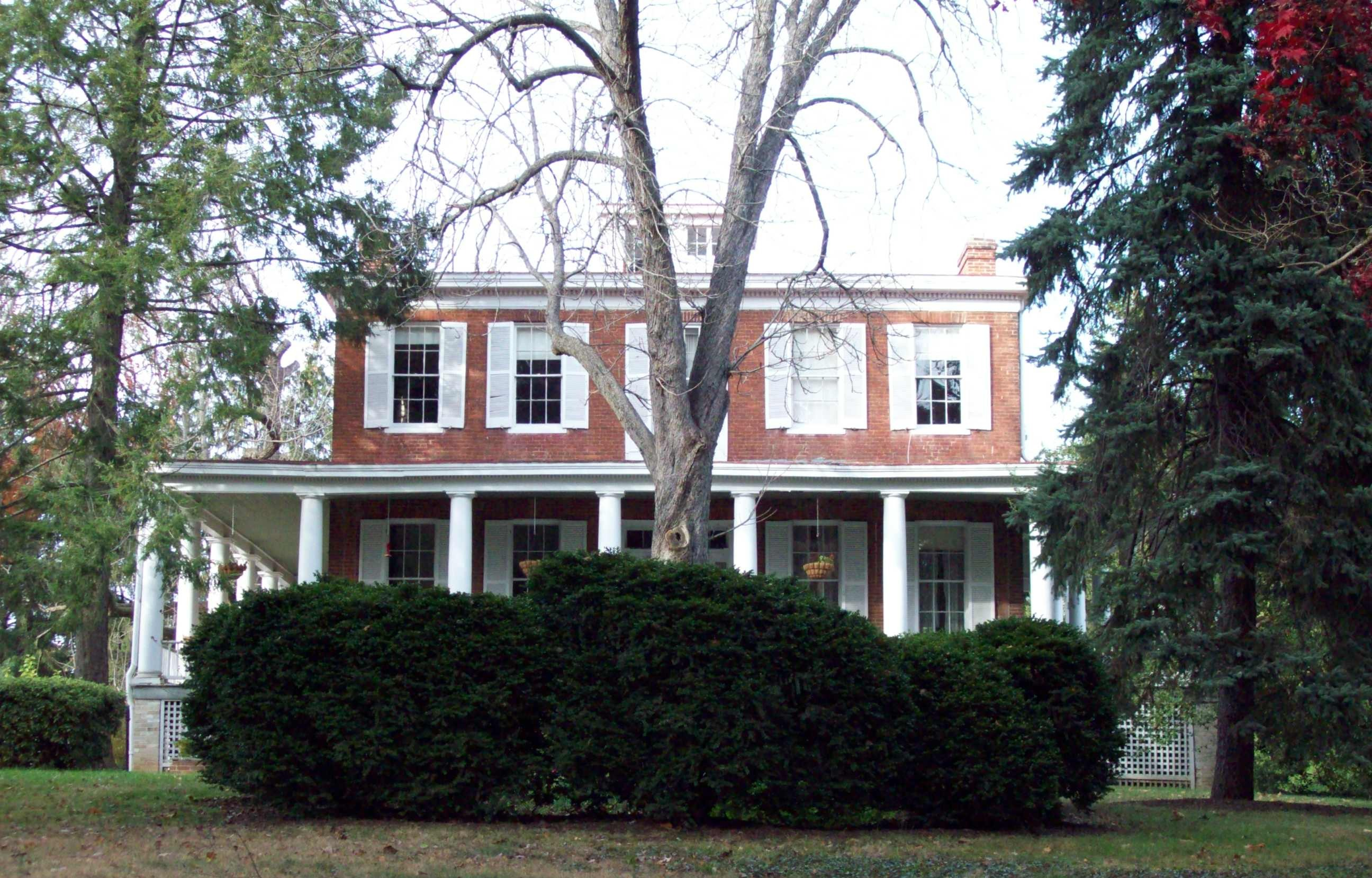
- Ash Hill November 2008

- Location within Maryland Location within the United States
- Location: 3308 Rosemary Lane, Hyattsville, Maryland
- Coordinates: 38°58′49″N 76°57′34″W
- Built: 1840
- Architect: Clark, Robert
- Architectural style: Greek Revival, Late Victorian
- NRHP reference No.: 77001523
- Added to NRHP: September 16, 1977

Ash Hill, also known as Hitching Post Hill, is a historic two-story brick dwelling located on Rosemary Lane in Hyattsville, Prince George's County, Maryland. The house was built around 1840 by Robert Clark, an Englishman who sought the peace and quiet of the countryside as a contrast to the crowded city life Washington, D.C.

In 1875, the property was purchased by General Edward Fitzgerald Beale, a well-connected figure known for his influential social circle. Beale was a close personal friend of President U.S. Grant, who visited Ash Hill and even kept his two Arabian horses, Leopard and Linden, stabled at Ash Hill. Beale also entertained other prominent figures of the time, including President Grover Cleveland and the famous showman Buffalo Bill Cody.

The house is architecturally notable for its imposing presence, emphasized by its foot-thick brick walls and commanding hilltop location. A significant addition to the house is the massive pillared porch that wraps around three sides of the building, which was added by Admiral Chauncey Thomas after he purchased the property in 1895.

In 1983, Jane Burch sold the property to John Giannetti, local politician, historian, and partner in the renowned ornamental plaster company, Giannetti's Studio. Giannetti installed period ornamental moldings and cornice, and extensively rehabilitated the property. John Giannetti, Jr. lived at the property prior to his time in the Maryland Senate. Giannetti sold the property in 2007 to its current owners.

Ash Hill was listed on the National Register of Historic Places in 1977.
