= Dominic Augustin Hall =

American judge (1765–1820)

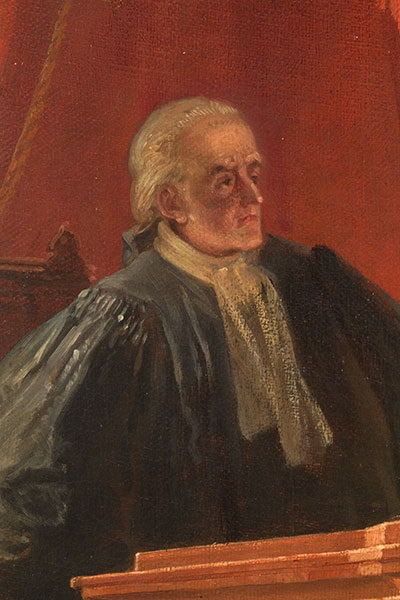

Judge of the United States District Court for the District of Louisiana
- In office June 1, 1813 – December 19, 1820
- Appointed by: James Madison
- Preceded by: himself
- Succeeded by: John Dick
- In office June 1, 1812 – February 22, 1813
- Appointed by: James Madison
- Preceded by: Seat established by 2 Stat. 701
- Succeeded by: himself

Chief Justice of the Louisiana Supreme Court
- In office February 22, 1813 – May 29, 1813
- Appointed by: William C. C. Claiborne
- Preceded by: Seat established
- Succeeded by: Francois Xavier Martin

Judge of the United States District Court for the District of Orleans
- In office December 11, 1804 – April 30, 1812
- Appointed by: Thomas Jefferson
- Preceded by: Seat established by 2 Stat. 283
- Succeeded by: Seat abolished

Chief Judge of the United States Circuit Court for the Fifth Circuit
- In office July 1, 1801 – July 1, 1802
- Appointed by: Thomas Jefferson
- Preceded by: Seat established by 2 Stat. 89
- Succeeded by: Seat abolished

Personal details
- Born: Dominic Augustin Hall; January 1, 1765 Province of South Carolina, British America
- Died: December 19, 1820 (aged 55) New Orleans, Louisiana

Dominic Augustin Hall (January 1, 1765 – December 19, 1820) was chief justice of the Louisiana Supreme Court, chief judge for the United States Circuit Court for the Fifth Circuit, and a judge for the United States District Court for the District of Louisiana and the District of Orleans (the federal territorial court replaced by the District of Louisiana).

== Education and career ==
Born on January 1, 1765, in the Province of South Carolina, British America, Hall entered private practice in Charleston, South Carolina starting in 1789.

== Federal judicial service ==
Hall received a recess appointment from President Thomas Jefferson on July 1, 1801, to the United States Circuit Court for the Fifth Circuit, to the new Chief Judge seat authorized by 2 Stat. 89. He was nominated to the same position by President Jefferson on January 6, 1802. He was confirmed by the United States Senate on January 26, 1802, and received his commission the same day. His service terminated on July 1, 1802, due to abolition of the court.

Hall was nominated by President Jefferson on November 30, 1804, to the United States District Court for the District of Orleans, to a new seat authorized by 2 Stat. 283. He was confirmed by the Senate on November 30, 1804, and received his commission on December 11, 1804. His service terminated on April 30, 1812, due to abolition of the court.

Hall was nominated by President James Madison on May 27, 1812, to the United States District Court for the District of Louisiana, to a new seat authorized by 2 Stat. 701. He was confirmed by the Senate on May 28, 1812, and received his commission on June 1, 1812. His service terminated on February 22, 1813, due to his resignation.

Hall was nominated by President Madison on May 29, 1813, to a seat on the United States District Court for the District of Louisiana vacated by himself. He was confirmed by the Senate on June 1, 1813, and received his commission the same day. His service terminated on December 19, 1820, due to his death in New Orleans, Louisiana.

=== Other service ===
Hall was the chief justice of the Louisiana Supreme Court from February 1813, until May 1813.

== Conflict with Andrew Jackson ==
In 1815, after it was learned that a treaty ending the War of 1812 had been signed, Hall challenged Andrew Jackson's continuing enforcement of martial law. Hall was particularly incensed that Jackson had executed six militiamen for departing early from their enlistments. Jackson threw Hall in jail for daring to question his rule. After martial law ended, Hall fined Jackson $1,000 for contempt of court. Nearly 30 years later, in 1844, Congress voted to repay the fine to Jackson, with interest.

Legal offices
Preceded by Seat established by 2 Stat. 89	Chief Judge of the United States Circuit Court for the Fifth Circuit; 1801–1802	Succeeded by Seat abolished
Preceded by Seat established by 2 Stat. 283	Judge of the United States District Court for the District of Orleans; 1804–1812	Succeeded by Seat abolished
Preceded by Seat established by 2 Stat. 701	Judge of the United States District Court for the District of Louisiana; 1812–1813	Succeeded by himself
Preceded by Seat established	Chief Justice of the Louisiana Supreme Court; 1813	Succeeded by Francois Xavier Martin
Preceded by himself	Judge of the United States District Court for the District of Louisiana; 1813–1820	Succeeded by John Dick
