= Natchez Ariel =

Mississippi newspaper (1825–1832)

The Ariel, later The Natchez, was a newspaper published in Natchez, Mississippi, United States from 1825 until 1832. According to Isaac M. Partridge of the Vicksburg Whig:

In 1825, James K. Cook started the Ariel in Natchez. Take it altogether, it was one of the best papers ever published in Mississippi. Cook was born in Adams county, under the Spanish government. He inherited a large estate, which he spent improvidently. Afterwards he turned editor, and his paper was the organ of the Adams party, which I have the authority of a very distinguished historian and literateur for saying, at that time embraced most of the wealth of Natchez, Adams county, and the river country generally. His paper obtained a large circulation, and judging from the files I have seen in the State Library, it was well deserved, it being an interesting sheet, full of readable articles and news items, with the matter well arranged. Mr. Cook was not a polished, but always a sensible and well informed writer. After the lapse of a few years, he changed the name of his paper to the Natchez. Soon after, he retired from the press, and subsequently removed to Brooklyn, where he closed his life. He died within the past few years. It is said that the only contributions to the press of the North from his pen, were in defence of the traduced institutions of the South."

Pennsylvania-born Whig-aligned planter baron Stephen Duncan "supported" The Ariel in some capacity in 1827.
