= Legal affairs of Andrew Jackson =

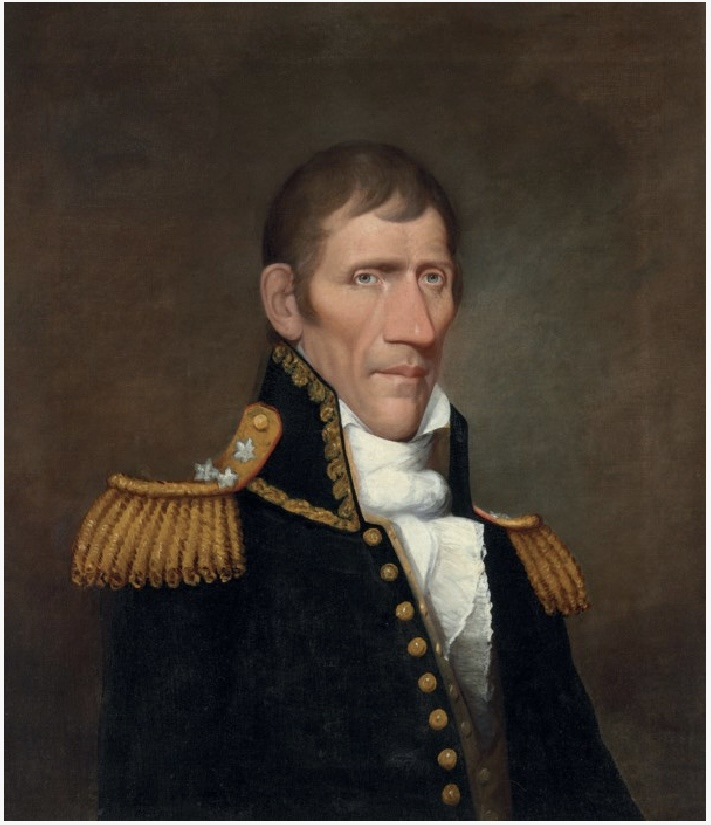
Earliest portrait of Jackson painted "from life," believed to have been created 1815 by New Orleans artist Nathan Wheeler

This is a list of legal cases involving Andrew Jackson, who became the 7th U.S. president in 1828.

- August 1787 – Sued by a horse trader in Rowan County, North Carolina, along with Hugh Montgomery and William Cupples, for £500. Arrest warrant issued, with help of two other friends, posted recognizance bond, and "no further records exist, suggesting that the case was settled out of court or dismissed."
- State of Tennessee v. Andrew Jackson (1806) - assault and battery against Thomas Baird, found guilty, fined
- State of Tennessee v. Andrew Jackson (1807) - assault with intent to kill against Samuel Dorsey Jackson, acquitted by jury
- United States v. Andrew Jackson (1815) - Declared martial law, arrested Dominic Hall and Louis Louaillier for protesting his declaration, had a federal judge Hall thrown out of his own jurisdiction; was charged with obstruction of justice; was later charged with contempt of court, was fined and paid US$1,000 (equivalent to $17,591 in 2025).

== See also ==
- List of violent incidents involving Andrew Jackson
- Andrew Jackson and the slave trade in the United States
- Early career of Andrew Jackson
- Censure of Andrew Jackson
- Bibliography of Andrew Jackson
