= Bernard de Marigny =

American politician (1785–1868)

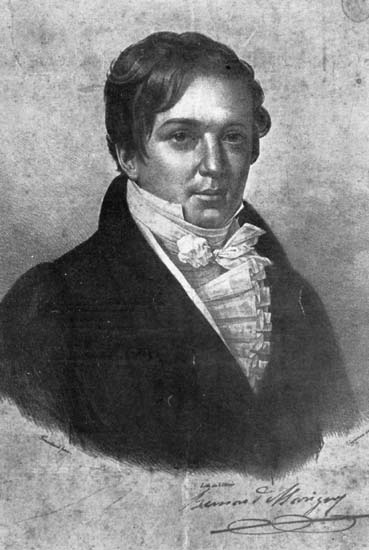

President of the Louisiana State Senate
- In office 1822
- Preceded by: Julien de Lallande Poydras
- Succeeded by: Henry S. Thibodaux

Member of the Louisiana State Senate
- In office 1818–1822

Member of the Louisiana House of Representatives

Personal details
- Born: October 28, 1785 New Orleans, New Spain
- Died: February 3, 1868 (aged 82) New Orleans, Louisiana, U.S.
- Resting place: Saint Louis Cemetery No. 1
- Citizenship: French, American
- Party: Democratic-Republican
- Spouse(s): Mary Ann Jones (1786-1808), Anna Mathilde Morales (1789-1859)
- Children: 8, including Jacques Philippe

Jean-Bernard Xavier Philippe de Marigny de Mandeville (1785–1868), known as Bernard de Marigny, was a French-Creole American nobleman, playboy, planter, politician, duelist, writer, horse breeder, land developer, and President of the Louisiana State Senate between 1822 and 1823.

== Early life ==
The son of Pierre Enguerrand Philippe de Marigny de Mandeville (1751-1800) Ecuyer and Chevalier de St. Louis and his wife Jeanne Marie d'Estrehan de Beaupré, Bernard was born in New Orleans in 1785, the third generation of his family to be born in colonial Louisiana. His paternal grandfather, Antoine Philippe de Marigny, was a French nobleman, military officer, and geographer. His maternal grandfather, Jean Baptiste d'Estrehan, was the royal treasurer of the colony.

In 1798, Louis-Philippe, Duke of Orléans (who became King Louis Philippe in 1830) and his two brothers, the Duke de Montpensier and the Count of Beaujolais, visited the Marigny plantation during their exile from France following the French Revolution. By all accounts, they were lavishly entertained by the family. One story recounts that special gold dinnerware was made for the occasion of the Duke of Orleans' visit and was thrown into the river afterward, because no one would be worthy of using it again.

The visit of the French royal family apparently had a big impact on Marigny. When he was 15 years old, his father died and Bernard inherited his father's plantation just outside the city gates, east of New Orleans' Vieux Carré. According to historians, "His every whim [was] indulged while his father was alive, he became as wild and headstrong after his death as an unbacked [wild] mustang, and his guardian, abandoning all idea of control, finally shipped him to England, hoping that life abroad might mend his manners; but in London Bernard's dissipations became only more pyrotechnic, and he spent most of his time at Almack's and other famous gambling places."

== Mardi Gras ==
Marigny funded the first organized New Orleans Mardi Gras celebration in 1833, this model is what the Mistick Krewe of Comus would base their first parade and tableau on.

== Craps ==
One of the things Marigny brought back to New Orleans from England was the dice game Hazard which became popular in a simplified form, known in local dialect as "Crapaud." The evolution of Hazard gave rise to the modern-day table craps, still popular in casinos today.

== Faubourg Marigny ==
On reaching his majority in 1806, Marigny at once had his plantation subdivided and began to develop the Faubourg Marigny (The Louisiana Purchase had taken place in 1803). Marigny had many gambling debts; and the smaller the land parcels were, the more there were to sell. The area grew rapidly and lots were sold all the way into the 1820s. Marigny's development was immediately popular. He spent most of 1806 and 1807 at the office of notary Narcisse Broutin selling sixty-foot lots or emplacements to prospective home builders. Marigny famously named the streets of his neighborhood whimsically: Abundance, Peace, History, Poets, Piety, Frenchmen, Greatmen, Goodchildren, Music, Desire, Hope, Love, Pleasure, Duels, and Craps (after the game of chance he introduced to America). "Though said to be poorly educated in the classics, he christened the main thoroughfare to his house Elysian Fields after Virgil's "Deathless Residence of the Spirits of the Blessed." Others say that Elysian Fields Avenue was named simply as the English translation for the Parisian Avenue des Champs-Élysées.

As more English-speaking Americans arrived in New Orleans, tensions between them and the settled Creoles began to grow. When two American developers approached Marigny about future commercial development of the city in the area of the Faubourg Marigny, the Creole agreed, but Madame de Marigny did not appear at the notary's office, killing the deal; historians debate whether Marigny had instructed her to do so or if she chose not to come of her own accord—the couple had become estranged, and Madame de Marigny would file for a separation of property not long after. The Americans, however, saw this as an act of bad faith on the part of Marigny, and it not only ensured their infrastructural improvements would be made uptown instead below the Vieux Carré. "Marigny was severely blamed by the rest of the Creole population for thus yielding to his anti-American prejudices. This feeling ultimately worked his political destruction. Thereafter he was not looked on as a safe leader, and when he became a candidate for the governorship, they refused to support him."

Marigny sold his lots not only to white Creoles but to free black Creoles, known as gens de couleur libre, and emigrés from Saint Domingue, who flooded into Louisiana following the revolution on that island. He also gave several parcels to his half-sister, Eulalie Mandeville Macarty, the daughter of Pierre Enguerrand Philippe De Marigny de Mandeville and Jeanne Marie, a woman from Congo whom Pierre enslaved until after the birth of his daughter. Eulalie was given her freedom and brought up by her paternal grandparents, and she later became one of the wealthiest women in Louisiana. Bernard de Marigny testified on Eulalie de Mandeville's behalf following her husband's death, when her in-laws sued her for her estate. They claimed that legally a femme de couleur libre, such as herself, could not inherit the amount of money she possessed from her late-husband (or life partner, as interracial marriage was illegal). Eulalie countered by arguing that all the money she possessed she and her husband earned as equals and that the majority of their wealth came from her business endeavour from before their marriage. Bernard de Marigny testified in favour of his half-sister and helped her hold on to her wealth, not once but twice, as her late husband's family sued Eulalie de Mandeville again after being dissatisfied with the results of the first trial.

== Battle of New Orleans ==
Marigny and Edward Livingston were unable to convince General Andrew Jackson to meet and seek the support of Jean Lafitte to aid in the Battle of New Orleans, whom the British forces had tried to recruit but who, according to Marigny, was more inclined to support the Americans. Lafitte did eventually meet and persuade Jackson of the Baratarian's support, which proved very useful during the campaign, meriting personal and public praise from Jackson.

Marigny served as aide-de-camp for Louisiana governor, William C. C. Claiborne, during the battle of New Orleans

At the Battle of New Orleans, Marigny distinguished himself by his courage and activity. It is noteworthy that the glorious victory was reaped on the fields of the plantation of his Uncle [Martin] de Lino de Chalmette. In 1824 he supported General Jackson for President not only with his usual fiery eloquence, but also, perhaps more effectively, with force of arms. He was an ardent duelist and an expert with sword and pistol, and he has been credited with fifteen or more encounters. [Footnote:] Bernard Marigny's Réflexions sur la campagne du Général André Jackson en Louisiane en 1814 et 1815, New Orleans; 1848, is the best account we have of the preparations made to meet the enemy before the battle; and of the ensuing episode.

— Grace King, Old Families of New Orleans

== Political career ==
In 1811, and again in 1814, Marigny was elected to the New Orleans City Council to represent the Fifth Ward. From 1822 to 1823, Marigny served as President of the Louisiana State Senate; and, as there was no Lieutenant Governor, he was next in line of succession to Governor Thomas B. Robertson.

Marigny was aide-de-camp of the prefect Pierre Clément de Laussat, then of Louisiana governor, William C. C. Claiborne, during the battle of New Orleans — whose daughter, Sophronie Louise, later wed Marigny's son, Antoine James de Marigny. He was chairman of the state Senate from Louisiana, 1822 to 1823.

In 1824, Marigny ran for Governor of Louisiana, but was defeated by Anglo candidate Henry Johnson. He ran again in the gubernatorial election of 1828, but he was defeated by Pierre Derbigny, whom he had supported in the 1820 election. Marigny was at one point a candidate in the special gubernatorial election of 1830, but ultimately he was not on the ballot.

== North shore activities ==
Marigny's land holdings included a sugarcane plantation on the north shore of Lake Pontchartrain. This region is Saint Tammany Parish, one of the Florida Parishes, lands acquired by the U.S. in 1810, prior to Louisiana's transition to statehood.

Today, there are a few ruins of Marigny's 1829 sugar mill; the area comprises Fontainebleau State Park. Fontainebleau was the name Marigny chose for his property, after the Fontainebleau Forest near Paris. In 1834, Marigny de Mandeville laid out the town which bears his family name, Mandeville, Louisiana.

== Fair Grounds Race Course ==
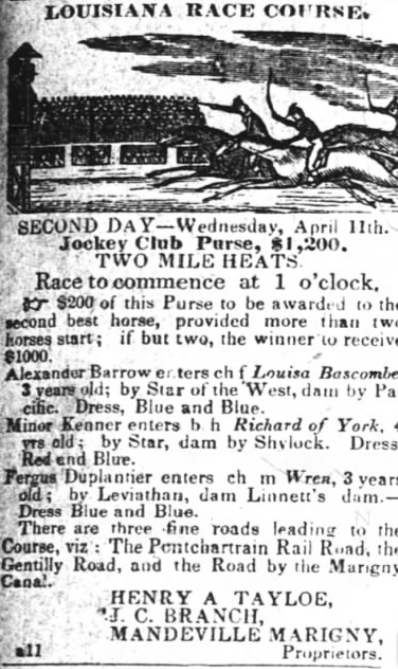
Louisiana Race Course 1838 Spring Meeting

Marigny founded the "Louisiana Race Course," now the Fair Grounds Race Course, with Julius C Branch and Henry Augustine Tayloe. As the son of John Tayloe III of the Octagon House, founder of the Washington Jockey Club, and grandson of John Tayloe Jr. of Mount Airy, Tayloe was the scion of a founding family in American racing. John Tayloe III had imported the great English thoroughbred Diomed whose descendents include Lexington, Secretariat and American Pharoah, and John Tayloe, Jr. had imported three of the most important colonial horses, Childers, by Flying Childers, Jenny Cameron and Jolly Rogers.

The first races, in Spring 1838, lasted for five days. On April 10, 1838, the first race for "The Creole Purse" of $1,000 was run, free only for horses bred and owned in the state of Louisiana. With two-year-olds at a feather' three-year-olds, 86lbs; four-year-olds, 100 lbs' five-year-olds, 110 lbs; six-year-olds, 118 lbs; aged 124 lbs and with the usual allowance of three pounds to mare and geldings, the races were mile heats. First Day, First Race - owners and horses: Fergus Duplantier, Louisianese; John F Miller, Lord of the Isles; Robert J Barrows, Tom Jones; Y.N. Oliver, Pocohantas; Sosthene Allian, Tresorrier. Second Race, sweepstakes for three-year-olds, weights as before, five subscribers at $1000 each, $250 forfeit, mile heats. Owners and horses: Wiliiam J Minor, Britiania; Thos. J Wells, Taglioni; John F Miller, John Boy; Henry Tayloe, Tom Thurman; Col Robert Smith, Lavinia. Second day, first race, purse $1,200, entrance $120, free for all ages, weights as before, two-mile heats. Owners and horses: Minor Kenner, Richard of York; A Barrows, Louisa Bascombe; Fergus Duplantier, Wren. The third day, purse $1,800, entrance $180, free for all ages, weights as before, three-mile heats. Owners and horses: Wm. R Barrow, Pressure, Thos. J Wells, Dick Chin; J. S. Garrison, Pollard; John Randolph Grymes, Susan Yandall; Robert Smith, Pete Whetstone. Fourth day "Creole Plate" (as seen in the picture), valued at $1,000. Entrance $100, five-year-olds and over to carry 100lbs; four-year-olds and under their appropriate weights, two-mile heats. Owners and horses: Adam Lewis Bingaman, Angora; Henry Augustine Tayloe, Hortense (co-proprietor of Louisiana Race Course).

The next year, in the Spring of 1839, the First Day saw the running for the "Creole Purse" of $500, one-mile heats; the "Proprietors Purse" for $250, one-mile heats; and third race "Sweepstakes" (See Spirit of Times). Second Day-"Proprietors Purse" $1,200—two-mile heat; if more than two start the second best to be entitled to $200-but if two, the winner to receive $1,000. Third-Day-"Jockey Club Purse" $1,800—three-mile heats; of which the second best will be entitled to $300, if more than two start-if but two, the winner to receive $1500. Fourth Day-"Jockey Club Plate" value $1,500 and $500, -four mile heats-to the winner, and $500 to the second-best horse, provided more than two starts. Fifth Day-"Proprietors Purse" $600—mile heat-best 3 in 5; Same Day-"The Louisiana Plate" value $1,000—two-mile heats; five-year-olds and over will carry 100lbs.- four-year-olds and under their appropriate weight."

== Later life and death ==
Marigny's fortunes began to decline in the 1850s. Levee crevasses destroyed his sugar crops in 1850 and 1851, and the plummeting price of bricks forced his brickyard into bankruptcy. Citizen's Bank, which held mortgages on his properties, forced their sale at depressed prices during a downturn in the sugar and brick market, and Marigny was left in reduced circumstances. He lived in an apartment in a building he owned at the corner of Frenchman and Royal Streets, in the Faubourg named after his family. He died suddenly in 1868. He was buried at Saint Louis Cemetery No. 1 in New Orleans. (His mother, father, paternal grandfather, and paternal great-grandfather were interred in the St. Louis Cathedral. The engraved slab listing the men's names is one of only two prominent grave monuments located inside the cathedral.)

The Faubourg Marigny and the town of Mandeville, Louisiana, are named after him and his family as are two New Orleans streets: Marigny and Mandeville.

== Books authored ==
- Réflexions sur la Campagne du Général André Jackson (1848: Reflections on General Andrew Jackson's Campaign)

== See also ==
- His son Antoine James de Marigny
- History of New Orleans
- History of Louisiana
- List of streets of New Orleans
- Neighborhoods in New Orleans
