= Thomas Butler (Louisiana politician) =

American politician (1785–1847)

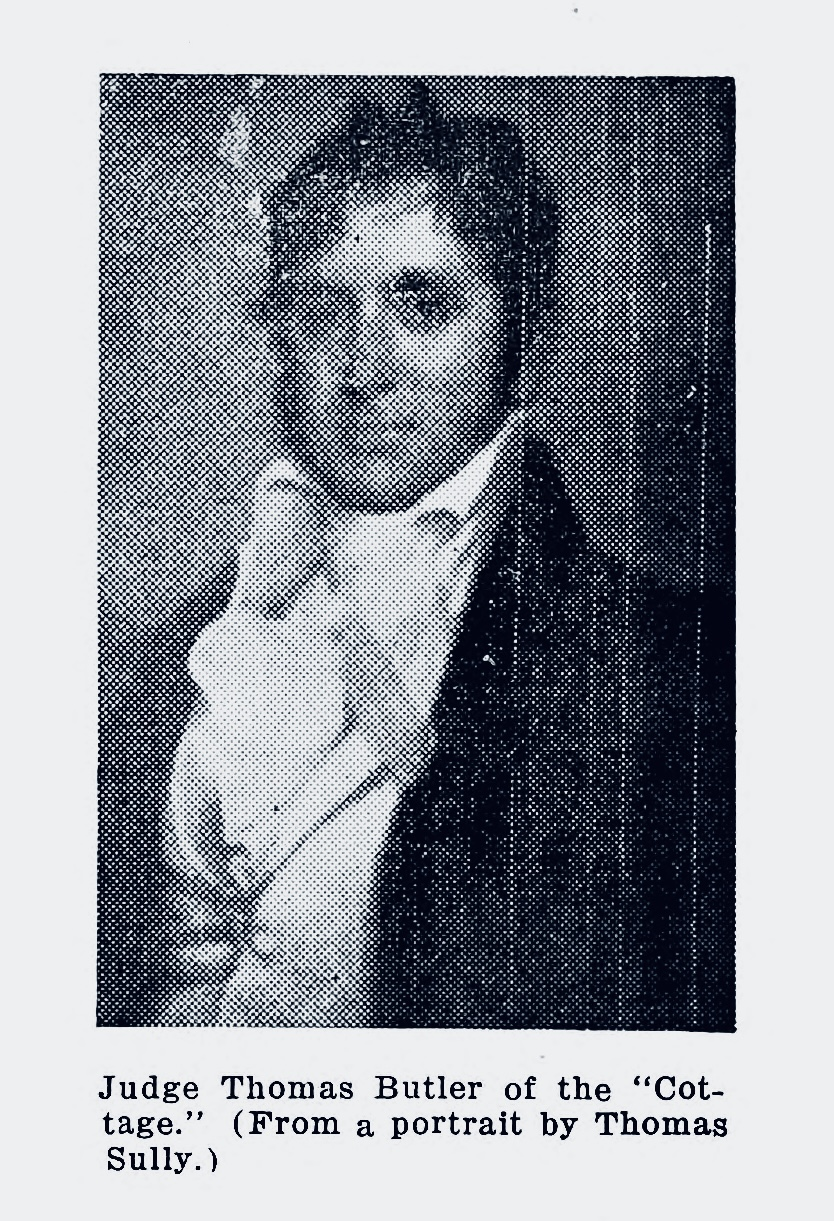
- Published in Old Louisiana plantation homes and family trees (1941)

Member of the U.S. House of Representatives from Louisiana's at-large district
- In office November 16, 1818 – March 3, 1821
- Preceded by: Thomas B. Robertson
- Succeeded by: Josiah S. Johnston

Personal details
- Born: April 14, 1785 near Carlisle, Pennsylvania, U.S.
- Died: August 7, 1847 (aged 62) St. Louis, Missouri, U.S.
- Party: Democratic-Republican
- Other political affiliations: Whig; American
- Spouse: Anne Madeline Ellis (m. 1813)
- Children: 8
- Parent(s): Thomas Butler; Sarah Jane Semple
- Profession: Politician, lawyer

Thomas Butler (April 14, 1785 – August 7, 1847) was an American politician and lawyer who served in the United States House of Representatives from 1818 to 1821, representing the at-large congressional district of Louisiana as a member of the Democratic-Republican Party.

== Early life and education ==
Butler was born near Carlisle, Pennsylvania, on April 14, 1785, to Thomas Butler and Sarah Jane Semple. He attended the common schools and received a college education in Pittsburgh. He may be the Thomas Butler who is listed as "class of 1799, did not graduate" in the records of Dickinson College.

== Career ==
Butler studied law and was admitted to the bar, after which he commenced practice in Pittsburgh. In 1806 he was assigned to carry a letter from Aaron Burr to merchant William Wilkins and general John Wilkins Jr. in Pittsburg (kin to Natchez nabob James C. Wilkins); "the nature of [Burr's] plans was not disclosed in the letter that Butler carried but a map of the purchase was enclosed and this showed roads leading from the Mississippi River to the Ouachita tract and thence to Natchitoches near the Spanish border".

He moved to Mississippi Territory in 1807 and was admitted to the bar there the following year. He and his future brother-in-law Stockley D. Hays were both on the "List of Witnesses to be Summond against Aaron Burr" as "Thomas Butler the Son of the late Colonel" for the Burr conspiracy treason trial.

Butler became the captain of a cavalry troop in the Mississippi Territory Militia in 1810. He purchased land in Feliciana Parish, Louisiana, settling there in 1811.

Butler was appointed judge of Feliciana Parish on December 14, 1812. He was subsequently appointed judge of the third district by Louisiana governor William C. C. Claiborne on March 4, 1813.

Butler was elected as a member of the Democratic-Republican Party to the 15th United States Congress to fill the vacancy caused by the resignation of Thomas B. Robertson. He was subsequently elected to a full term in the 16th United States Congress. Butler's time in office began on November 16, 1818, and concluded on March 3, 1821. He was an unsuccessful candidate for renomination in 1820.

Following his tenure in the United States House of Representatives, Butler was appointed special judge of the third judicial district in 1822 and 1840. He became affiliated with the Whig Party, then the American Party.

Butler ran as a candidate in the 1824 Louisiana gubernatorial election. He came in last, receiving less than 3% of the vote. Butler also ran as a candidate in the 1828 Louisiana gubernatorial election, placing second and receiving over 21% of the popular vote.

In 1831 he was a commissioner for the newly organized West Feliciana Railroad, planned to run between Bayou Sara and Woodville.

Due to ill health, Butler declined to be a candidate for Congress in 1844. He instead became the owner of sugar and cotton plantations, as well as president of the Board of Trustees of Louisiana College, located in Jackson, Louisiana. Additionally, Butler was a member of the Louisiana Historical Society.

Butler was a slaveowner.

Butler died of apoplexy on the steamboat Old Hickory at St. Louis, Missouri, on August 7, 1847. He was interred on his plantation, "The Cottage", located near St. Francisville, Louisiana.

== Personal life and death ==
Butler married Anne Madeline Ellis in 1813. They had eight children together. Ann Ellis was a granddaughter of Richard Ellis, for whom the Ellis Cliffs near Natchez were named. They had 12 children, eight of whom survived to adulthood. Several of their grandchildren intermarried with the Fort family.

1. Percival Butler (or Pierce Butler), born February 21, 1817 m. Mary Louise Stirling
2. Richard Ellis Butler, born December 31, 1819, m. Sarah Evelyn Ker, daughter of John Ker of Linden plantation
3. Robert Ormond Butler m. Margaret Burthe, daughter of Judge Victor Burthe and Estelle Millaudon, daughter of Benjamin Laurent Millaudon
4. Margaret Butler
5. Sarah Jane Duncan Butler
6. Anna Butler
7. Mary Ellis Butler
8. Edward Butler

== Electoral history ==
=== 1824 ===
1824 Louisiana gubernatorial election
Party	Candidate	Votes	%
Democratic-Republican	Henry S. Johnson	2,846	43.64
Democratic-Republican	Jacques Villeré	1,831	28.07
Democratic-Republican	Bernard de Marigny	1,427	21.87
Democratic	Philemon Thomas	236	3.62
Democratic-Republican	Thomas Butler	184	2.82
Total votes		6,542	100.0
Democratic-Republican hold			

=== 1828 ===
1828 Louisiana gubernatorial election
Party	Candidate	Votes	%
National Republican	Pierre Derbigny	3,372	46.31
National Republican	Thomas Butler	1,562	21.46
Democratic	Bernard de Marigny	1,196	16.43
Democratic	Philemon Thomas	1,151	15.81
Total votes		7,281	100.0
National Republican gain from Democratic-Republican			

== See also ==
- Fighting Butlers, his father and uncles
- Robert Butler, his brother
- William Edward Butler, his brother
- Thomas Langford Butler, first cousin
- Richard Ellis Butler, first cousin

== Sources ==
- Abernethy, Thomas Perkins (1954). The Burr Conspiracy. New York: Oxford University Press. LCCN 54006907. OCLC 710644.
- Boudreaux, Sybil Ann (May 1983). The First Minute Book of the Supreme Court of the State of Louisiana 1813 to May, 1818: An Annotated Edition (M.A. History). University of New Orleans. 1683.
- Rothstein, Morton (1979). "The Changing Social Networks and Investment Behavior of a Slaveholding Elite in the Ante Bellum South: Some Natchez Nabobs, 1800–1860". In Greenfield, Sidney M.; Strickon, Arnold; Aubey, Robert T. (eds.). Entrepreneurs in Cultural Context. School of American Research, Advanced Seminar Series. Albuquerque: University of New Mexico Press. pp. 65–88. ISBN 978-0-8263-0504-6. LCCN 78021433. OCLC 4859059.

U.S. House of Representatives
Preceded by Thomas B. Robertson	Member of the U.S. House of Representatives from Louisiana's at-large congressional district 1818–1821	Succeeded by Josiah S. Johnston
