= Iris Rideau =

American businesswoman, merchant and vintner

- Born: 1937 (age 88–89); New Orleans, LA
- Citizenship: United States
- Education: Enology, University of California
- Occupations: Winemaker; Entrepreneur
- Years active: 1997-present
- Employer: Rideau Vineyard
- Known for: Rideau Vineyard Wines
- Children: Renee Rideau
- Awards: Best in Show, Los Angeles International Wine Competition
- Website: rideauvineyard.com

Iris Rideau (born c. 1937) is a French Creole winemaker, businesswoman and activist. She is the first Creole-American winemaker to own and operate a winery in the United States.

== Early life ==
Rideau was born in New Orleans, Louisiana, a paternal descendant of Frenchman Armand Allard Gabriel Duplantier who sailed to America in 1777 on Marquis de Lafayette's ship La Victoire and established a plantation in Point Coupee, and later the Magnolia Mound plantation in Baton Rouge.

She grew up in the Creole 7th Ward of the city, where her mother and uncles operated the Creole Bar and Grille. She has said, "There was not a great emphasis placed on education in my community, especially with Creole. Both my father and my mother attended high school, but neither graduated. Her father left the family and departed to California after her parents divorced when she was two-years old." She initially aspired to become a Broadway dancer. Her grandmother moved in and taught Rideau to speak French. In the summer months she visited her father and worked at his ranch in Corona, California, and after several years of insistence that she wanted to live closer to her father, they moved into a one-room flat in eastern Los Angeles when she was 12.

Her mother found work at a nearby sewing factory. At 16, Iris became pregnant and married, only to divorce the father of her daughter, Renee, a year later. She found employment at her mother's factory and enrolled in night classes at a junior college. Rideau has said of her employment at the factory and decision to take night classes, "The line of mostly Black and Hispanic women would wrap around the corner in the mornings. We made about $15 a week. I knew I'd need an education or I'd never escape." She graduated after a year and began working as a receptionist for an insurance agency, passing as a white woman to keep her job.

Rideau married Jimmy Rideau in 1957, and they divorced in 1978. She has since remained single and is a great grandmother.

Rideau has said that her drive to succeed as a businesswoman was a result of her natural self-motivating will and the environment that she grew up in. She has said "I never want to experience poverty again. That is what drives me. Also, when my daughter was growing up, I wanted to provide her with the security that I did not have as a child."

== Career ==
=== Investment banking ===
Rideau began her entrepreneurial career in 1967 when she opened the Rideau & Associates Insurance Agency, and followed with Rideau Retirement Planning Consultants. She was an involved investment and securities broker in Los Angeles, and became actively involved in seeking better rights for ethnic minorities. Rideau gained much respect in Los Angeles for her activism in the 1960s, and from 1973 to 1976, she was appointed as Chairman to the Mayor’s Affirmative Action Committee, under then-Los Angeles Mayor Tom Bradley, a job which involved securing employment for hundreds of ethnic minority women in the city. She managed the Rideau Insurance Agency from 1967 to 1999, and in 1982, she established Rideau Securities Firm, and set up two offices with 50 employees.

=== Wine ===
Rideau had long been passionate about food and drink when she decided to enter a career as a vintner in 1989. She bought a 6-acre plot of land in Solvang, California in the Santa Ynez Valley that year, and added 24 more acres six years later. This land became Rideau Vineyard two years later. Rideau employed an architect and winemaker to transform an adobe house into a wine tasting centre, with bathroom and kitchen facilities.

Rideau sold her insurance agency and brokerage company in 1997. She said of her decision, "You know when you get close to retirement you say, 'What am I going to do?' And I said, 'There's nothing to do out in this country other than raise horses or develop a vineyard. And I don't ride horses, so the next thing to do was start a vineyard." Rideau is interested in the production of Rhone wines, and produces Syrah, Mourvedre, Marsanne, Roussanne and Viognier. Black Enterprise magazine has said that she "effortlessly combines delectable grapes from the Rhone Valley of France with the savory taste of Creole cuisine in her winery."

She sold 300 cases in her first year and now produces some 7,500 cases annually and has worked with winemakers Ariel Lavie (2002-2005) and Andres Ibarra (2005-2008) making around $3.5 million a year. Her wines have won the Best in Show in the Los Angeles International Wine Competition.

Pamela M. Kalte has stated that her "success in the competitive world of vines and vineyards seems surprising, given that she knew nothing about wines before setting up Rideau."
