= 1824 Louisiana gubernatorial election =

- July 7, 1824
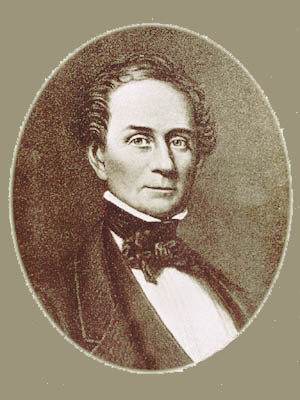

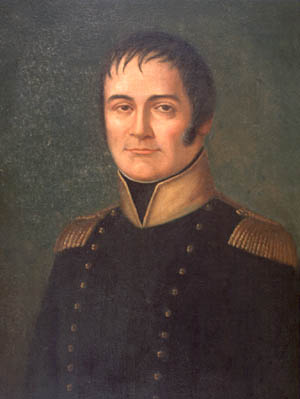

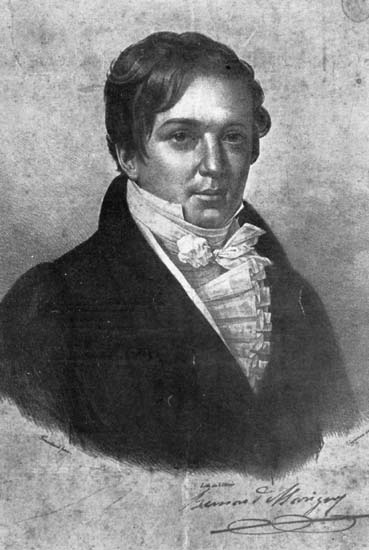
Nominee	Henry S. Johnson	Jacques Villeré	Bernard de Marigny
Party	Democratic-Republican	Democratic-Republican	Democratic-Republican
Electoral vote	41	16	0
Popular vote	2,847	1,831	1,427
Percentage	43.64%	28.07%	21.87%
Governor before election
Henry S. Thibodaux
Democratic-Republican
Elected Governor
Henry Johnson
Democratic-Republican

The 1824 Louisiana gubernatorial election was the fourth gubernatorial election to take place after Louisiana achieved statehood. Under Article III Sec 2 of the 1812 Constitution of the State of Louisiana the Governor was elected in two steps. On the first Monday in July, eligible voters went to the polls and voted. The returns were sent to the President of the Louisiana State Senate. On the second day of the session of the Louisiana State Legislature, the Louisiana House of Representatives and Senate met in joint session and voted between the top two candidates. The candidate who received a majority in General Assembly became governor.

== Results ==
Popular Vote

Candidate	Votes received	Percentage
Henry S. Johnson	2,846	43.64%
Jacques Villeré	1,831	28.07%
Bernard de Marigny	1,427	21.87%
Philemon Thomas	236	3.62%
Thomas Butler	184	2.82%
Total Vote	6,524	

General Assembly Vote

Candidate	Votes received	Percentage
Henry Johnson	41	71.93%
Jacques Villeré	16	28.07%
Total Vote	57	

Preceded by 1820 Louisiana gubernatorial election	Louisiana gubernatorial elections	Succeeded by 1828 Louisiana gubernatorial election
