= Florida Parishes =

Coordinates: 30.7°N 90.6°W

Florida Parishes Paroisses de Floride (French) Paroisses de la Floride (Louisiana Creole)
- Region
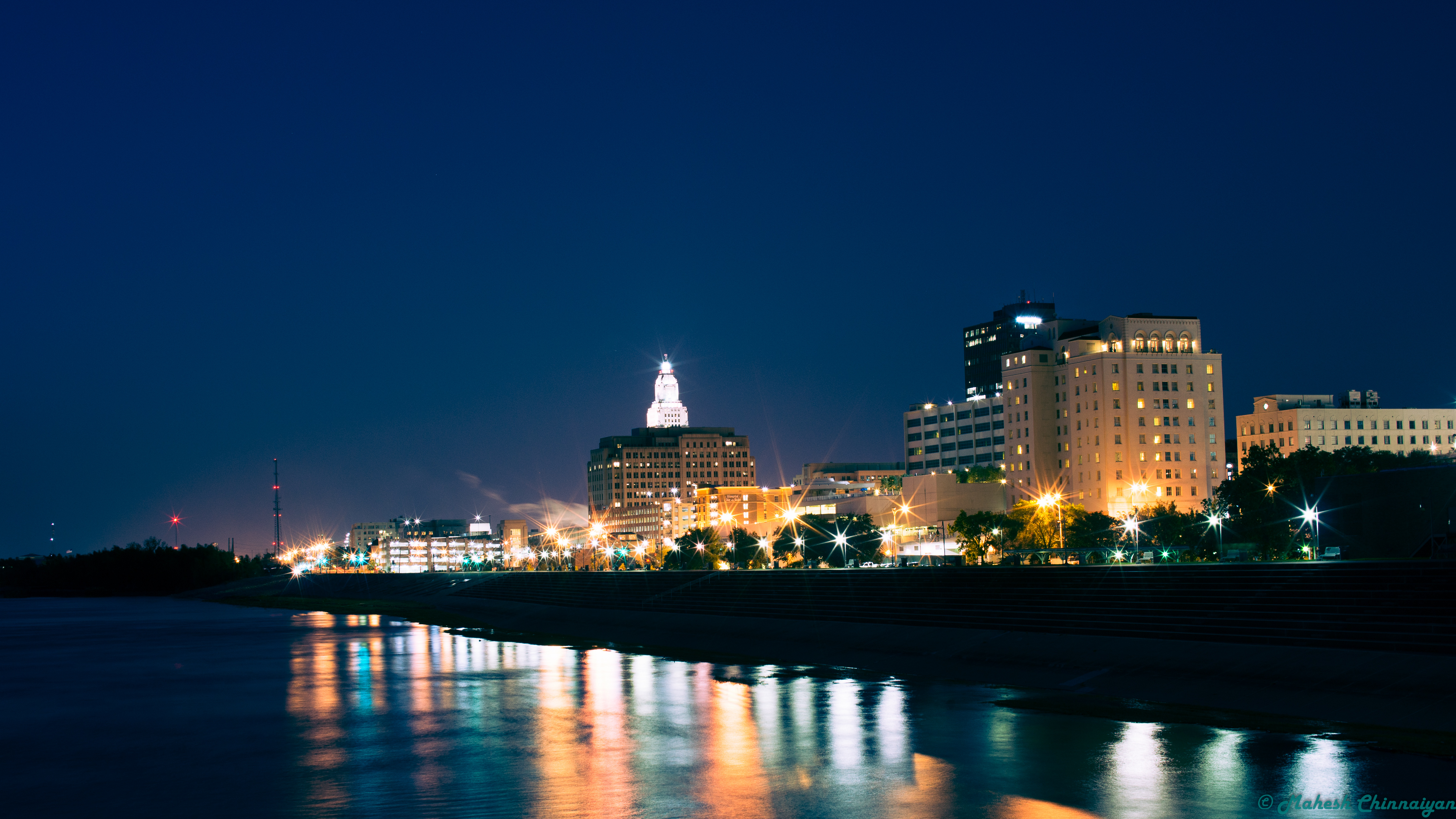
- Downtown Baton Rouge, Louisiana

- Flag

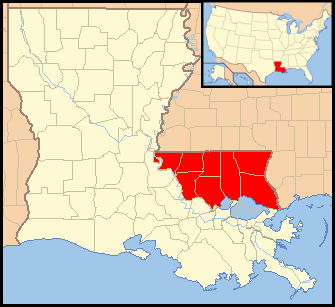
- Country: United States
- State: Louisiana

Population (2020)
  - Total: 1,088,014

The Florida Parishes, on the east side of the Mississippi River—an area also known as the Northshore or Northlake region—are eight parishes in the southeastern portion of the U.S. state of Louisiana. First settled by the French, it was ceded to Great Britain in 1763 after France's defeat in the Seven Years' War. The British exchanged it with Spain following the American Revolutionary War for territory outside North America. The Florida Parishes were part of what was known as West Florida in the 18th and early 19th centuries. This area was acquired by the U.S. in 1812 and combined with the new state of Louisiana. Unlike most of the state, this region was not part of the 1803 Louisiana Purchase, which applied to territory west of the Mississippi River.

== History ==
In terms of historical European influence, the area that became the Florida Parishes was first claimed by French colonists as part of Louisiane or French Louisiana. The French settled New Orleans, Mobile (now within Alabama), and founded numerous other settlements.

Following the French defeat in the French and Indian War, as the North American front of the Seven Years' War was known, France withdrew from North America, ceding the eastern half of French Louisiana — the land from the Mississippi River to the Appalachian Mountains, excluding New Orleans — to Great Britain in the 1763 Treaty of Paris. (France had previously transferred New Orleans and its lands west of the Mississippi to Spain in the 1762 Treaty of Fontainebleau, although Spain did not fully take control until after the Louisiana Rebellion of 1768.) Spain also ceded Florida to Britain under the treaty.

To administer the new territory along the Gulf of Mexico, Britain divided it at the Apalachicola River into two new colonial provinces, East and West Florida. However, following the American Revolutionary War, Britain ceded its Florida territories back to Spain, but uncertainty around the territories' borders sparked the West Florida Controversy, a territorial dispute with the newly formed United States. Pinckney's Treaty of 1795 settled the initial dispute, but the sale of Louisiana by France in 1803 raised new questions about West Florida. The Third Treaty of San Ildefonso and the subsequent Treaty of Aranjuez that restored French control over Louisiana did not include Spanish West Florida, leaving the territory outside of the land acquired by the U.S. in the Louisiana Purchase.

Aggrieved by the provincial Spanish government, American and British settlers in the part of West Florida west of the Pearl River declared an independent Republic of West Florida in 1810 and elected their leader, Fulwar Skipwith, as governor. None of this short-lived Republic of West Florida lay within the boundaries of the modern U.S. state of Florida.

The flag of the Republic of West Florida, which was later identified with the Confederates' Bonnie Blue Flag of the Civil War era, continues to be flown on many public buildings in the Florida Parishes. In 2006, the state legislature designated it the "official flag of the Republic of West Florida Historic Region."

The republic was quickly and forcibly annexed by the United States, and the present-day Florida Parishes were incorporated into the Territory of Orleans, which joined the Union as the U.S. state of Louisiana in 1812. In 1810, four parishes were established in the region: East Baton Rouge, Feliciana, St. Helena, and St. Tammany.

Later in the 19th century, five additional parishes were created as follows, with Feliciana Parish ceasing to exist: Washington Parish, 1819, from part of St. Tammany Parish; East Feliciana and West Feliciana parishes, 1824, by dividing Feliciana Parish; Livingston Parish, 1832, from part of St. Helena Parish; and Tangipahoa Parish, 1869 during the Reconstruction era, from parts of Livingston, St. Helena, St. Tammany, and Washington parishes.

In 1990, Louisiana's legislature formally designated this part of the state as "the Republic of West Florida Historic Region, or the Florida Parishes." Since 1993, Interstate 12, which runs east and west through the Northshore region, has been officially designated as the Republic of West Florida Parkway.

== Geography ==
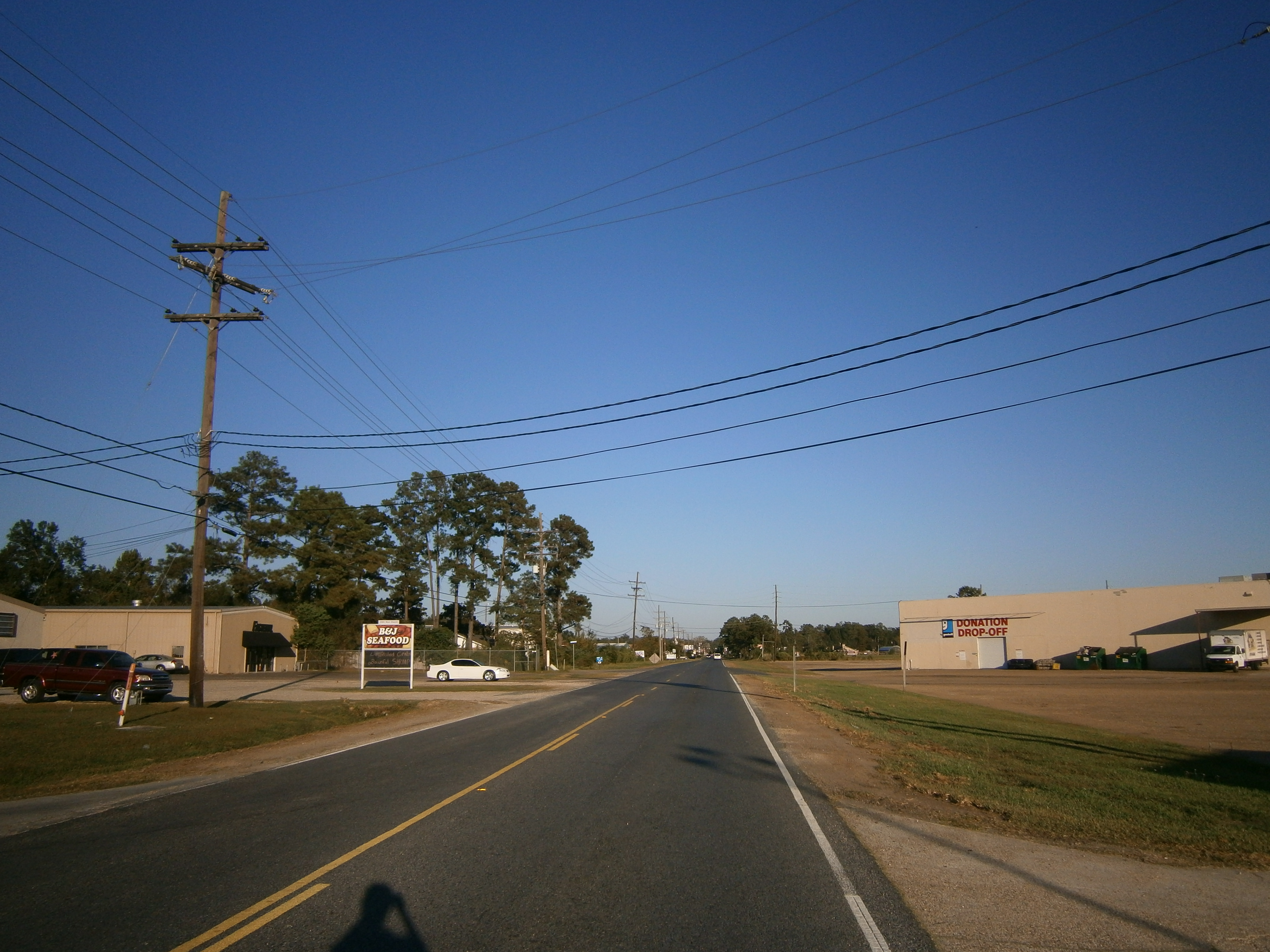
Hammond, Louisiana

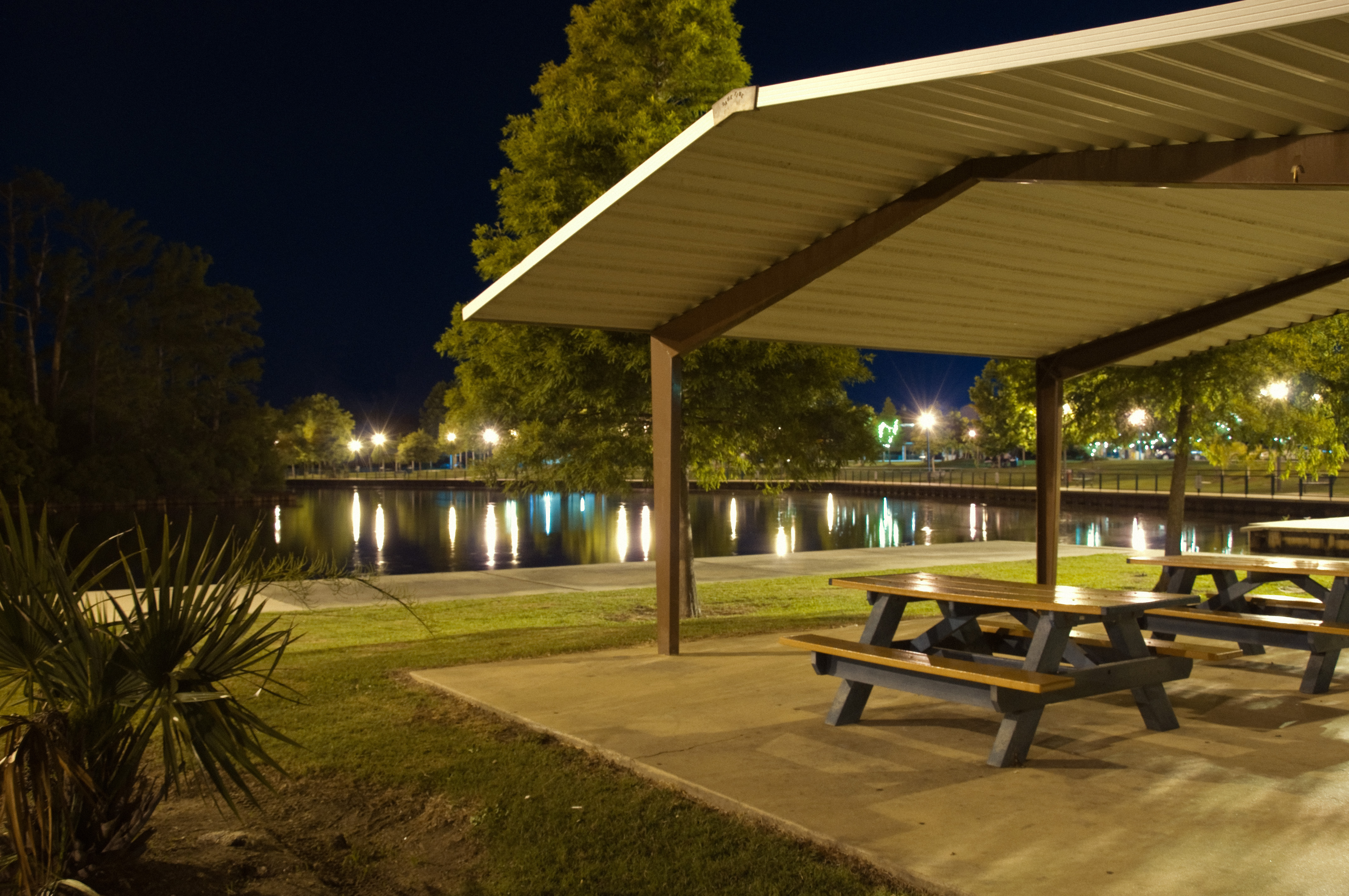
Heritage Park in Slidell, Louisiana

The Florida Parishes of Louisiana stretch from the Mississippi state line on its eastern and northern borders to the Mississippi River on its western border, and Lake Pontchartrain on its southern border. The most populated urban area is the Baton Rouge metropolitan statistical area. St. Tammany Parish is part of the New Orleans combined statistical area. The parishes have a land area of 4,685.184 square miles (12,134.57 km^{2}), or 10.755% of the state's total land area.

=== Parishes ===
- East Baton Rouge Parish
- East Feliciana Parish
- Livingston Parish
- St. Helena Parish
- St. Tammany Parish
- Tangipahoa Parish
- Washington Parish
- West Feliciana Parish

=== Climate ===
The Florida Parishes (in common with Greater New Orleans and Acadiana) has a humid subtropical climate, prone to hurricanes. Many parts of the Florida Parishes and parts of Acadiana flooded during the 2016 floods. During Hurricane Katrina, both regions were used as evacuation areas for residents of Greater New Orleans.

== Demographics ==
The population of the Florida Parishes at the 2010 census was 1,019,357 residents, or 22.49% of the state's population at that time. Its largest communities are, in descending order of population (2010 U.S. census), Baton Rouge, Slidell, Central, Hammond, Shenandoah (CDP), Zachary, Baker, Bogalusa, Mandeville, Gardere (CDP), Merrydale (CDP), Denham Springs, Covington, Lacombe (CDP), and Oak Hills Place (CDP). Tabulating the 2019 census estimates, the Florida Parishes had a population of 1,067,634, making it the third largest region by population following Acadiana (1,490,449) and Greater New Orleans (1,507,017); in 2020, the tabulated population of the Florida Parishes was 1,088,014.

=== Race and ethnicity ===
Common among South Louisiana and in contrast with the U.S. Census Bureau's publications, a substantial portion of the region's population, spanning a range of racial groups, identify ethnically and/or culturally as Cajun or Louisiana Creole. Nearby Acadiana and Greater New Orleans, however, have more Cajuns and Louisiana Creoles as those regions are epicenters of Acadian and multiracial Louisiana heritage.

=== Religion ===
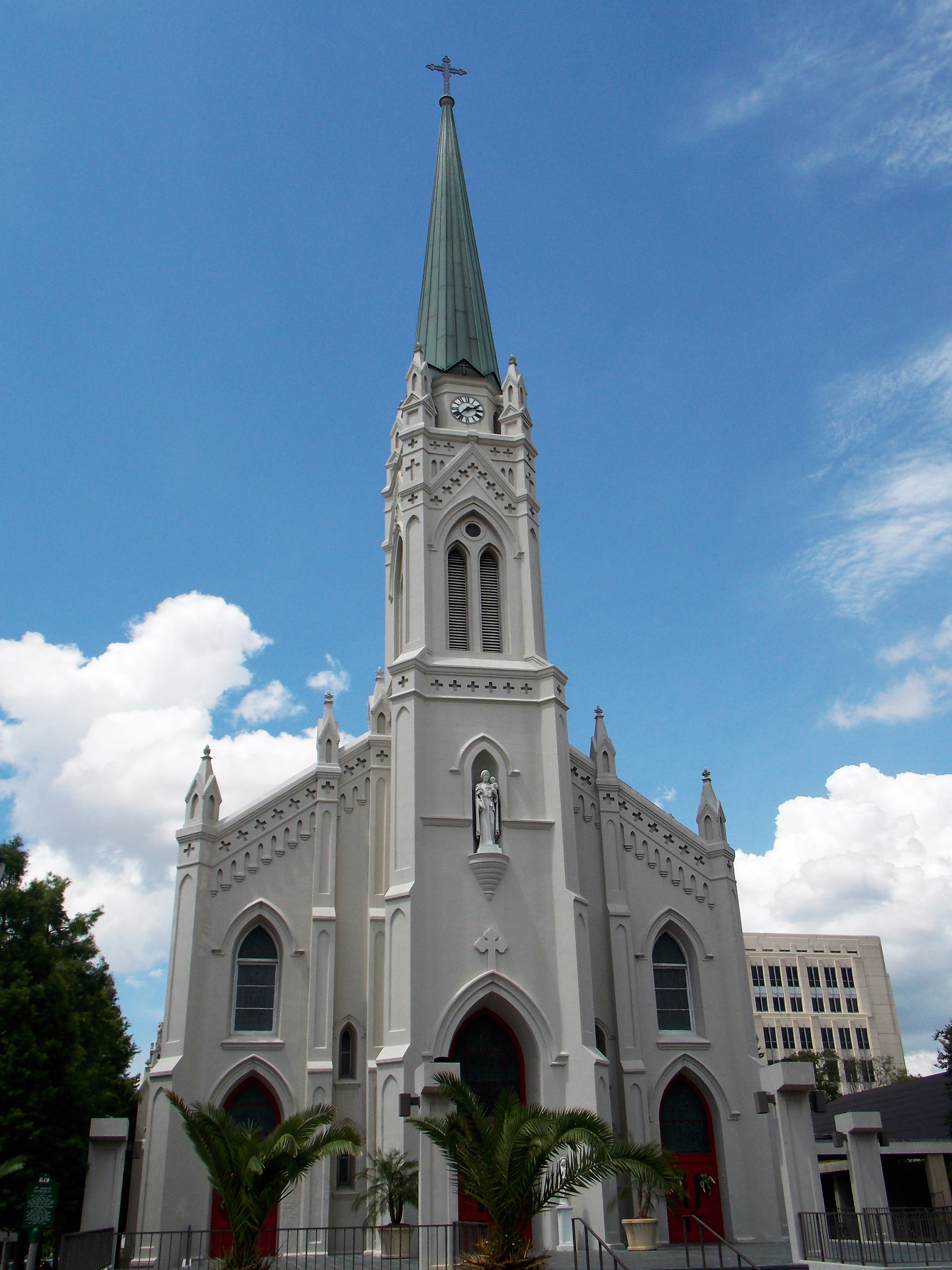
St. Joseph Cathedral, Baton Rouge

While Greater New Orleans and Acadiana are historically and predominantly Roman Catholic, the Florida Parishes are greatly influenced by Protestantism through British colonialism and missionary efforts, in addition to American settlement. In contrast with North and Central Louisiana, however, the Florida Parishes region is still dominated by the Roman Catholic Church as its single-largest Christian denomination. The second-largest overall denominational tradition in the region (especially Greater Baton Rouge) are Baptists. Baptists form the largest overall Protestant majority within Louisiana according to the Pew Research Center's 2014 study, spread among the Southern Baptist Convention—established in separation from the Northern Baptists (today the American Baptist Churches USA) over Southern white clergy and laymen's justifications of slavery—and the National Baptist Convention, USA which formed out of many black Baptist bodies leaving the Southern Baptists and white supervision.

== See also ==
- Intrastate regions
- Republic of West Florida
- Lake Pontchartrain
