= Abner Lawson Duncan =

American lawyer

- Born: Abbottstown, Adams County, Pennsylvania
- Died: December 27, 1823; New Orleans, Louisiana
- Occupations: Attorney businessman politician
- Spouses: Esther Eldridge; Frances Sophia Mather
- Children: John Nicholson, b: c. 1799; Frances Sophia, b: 1809; Hannah; Eliza, b: 1815; Abner Lawson Hamilton
- Parent(s): Seth Duncan; Elizabeth McCleary

Abner Lawson Duncan (died December 27, 1823) was a prominent Louisiana attorney, businessman, politician, and aide-de-camp to General Andrew Jackson during the Battle of New Orleans.

Duncan was a member of the "New Orleans Association" which included attorneys Edward Livingston and John R. Grymes, merchant John K. West, smuggler Pierre Laffite, and pirate Jean Laffite.

Duncan ran for governor as a Democratic-Republican during the Louisiana gubernatorial election of 1820, losing to Thomas B. Robertson.
