= Claude Trénonay =

Louisiana slave owner (1733–1792)

Jean Claude Trénonay de Chanfrey (1733 – 9 July 1792) was a wealthy slave-owner who owned a plantation near Point Coupee, Spanish Louisiana. In 1791, he owned 111 slaves.

Claude was the nephew and heir of Trénonay de Chanfret, who had been the sub-delegate of the Ordonnateur Michel in Point Coupee.

He died on 9 July 1792 when Latulipe, an enslaved Ibo, shot him with a musket while he was eating his dinner. Latulipe hanged himself in his slave cabin on 14 July.

His nephew Armand Duplantier inherited his estate after his death.
