= Leo-Raymond de Neckere =

Roman Catholic archbishop

The Right Reverend Leo-Raymond de Neckère CM
- Bishop of New Orleans
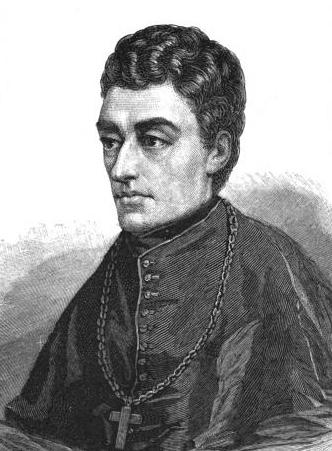
- Church: Roman Catholic Church
- See: New Orleans
- In office: 24 June 1830 – 4 September 1833
- Predecessor: Bishop Joseph Rosati, C.M.
- Successor: Archbishop Antoine Blanc

Orders
- Ordination: 13 October 1822
- Consecration: 24 June 1830 by Bishop Joseph Rosati, C.M.

Personal details
- Born: 6 June 1800 Wevelgem, Lys, French Republic (modern-day Belgium)
- Died: 4 September 1833 (aged 33) New Orleans, Louisiana, United States
- Buried: St. Louis Cathedral, New Orleans, Louisiana, United States

Leo-Raymond de Neckère, C.M. (6 June 1800 – 4 September 1833), was a Belgian-born Catholic prelate who served as Bishop of New Orleans from 1830 until his death in 1833.

== Biography ==
Born in Wevelgem, West Flanders, Leo-Raymond de Neckère studied the classics and philosophy at the college of Roeselare, and attended the seminary of Ghent. He accepted an invitation from Bishop Louis DuBourg in 1817 to serve as a missionary in Louisiana, United States, arriving in September of that year. He completed his studies at St. Mary's of the Barrens Seminary in Perryville, Missouri, on the outskirts of St. Louis, and there joined the Congregation of the Mission (also known as the Lazarists or Vincentians) in 1820. De Neckère was ordained to the priesthood on 13 October 1822. He then worked as a missionary and seminary professor before becoming superior of St. Mary's Seminary in 1826.

While in Europe to recuperate his health, de Neckère was appointed the first Bishop of New Orleans by Pope Pius VIII on 4 August 1829. Returning to the United States, he received his episcopal consecration on 24 June 1830 from Bishop Joseph Rosati, C.M., with Bishops Michael Portier and John England serving as co-consecrators, at St. Louis Cathedral. He convoked a synod of the diocesan clergy in February 1832 and established New Orleans' first English-speaking parish, St. Patrick's Church, in April 1833. After an outbreak of yellow fever in 1833, de Neckère, who had retired to Convent, returned to the episcopal see of New Orleans, where he himself fell victim to the fever and soon died at age 33.

Catholic Church titles
Preceded by Joseph Rosati	Bishop of New Orleans; 1830–1833	Succeeded by Antoine Blanc
