= Henry H. Gurley =

American politician (1788–1833)

Henry Hosford Gurley

Member of the U.S. House of Representatives from Louisiana's 2nd district
- In office March 4, 1823 – March 3, 1831
- Preceded by: None
- Succeeded by: Philemon Thomas

Personal details
- Born: May 20, 1788 Lebanon, Connecticut
- Died: March 16, 1833 (aged 44) Baton Rouge, Louisiana
- Party: National Republican Party
- Spouse: Lucy Goodwin Gurley

Henry Hosford Gurley (May 20, 1788 – March 16, 1833) was a member of the U.S. House of Representatives, representing the state of Louisiana. He served four terms, serving as a member of three parties.

Gurley was born in Lebanon, Connecticut, and attended Williams College. He was first elected to Congress as an Adams-Clay Republican, then served two terms as an Adams candidate, and finally served one term as an anti-Jacksonian. A collection of Gurley's papers between 1815 and 1831 is located in the Tulane University Special Collections. Gurley served as a district judge in Louisiana following his term in Congress.

== Family ==
Gurley married Lucy Goodwin of Boston, Massachusetts, on July 1, 1810. She died in January 1830. The couple had eight children—4 boys and 4 girls.

Gurley's brother, John Ward Gurley, served as the Territory of Orleans attorney general in 1803.

U.S. House of Representatives
Preceded by none	Member of the U.S. House of Representatives from Louisiana's 2nd congressional district 1823 – 1831	Succeeded by Philemon Thomas
