= Sury-le-Comtal =

- Commune
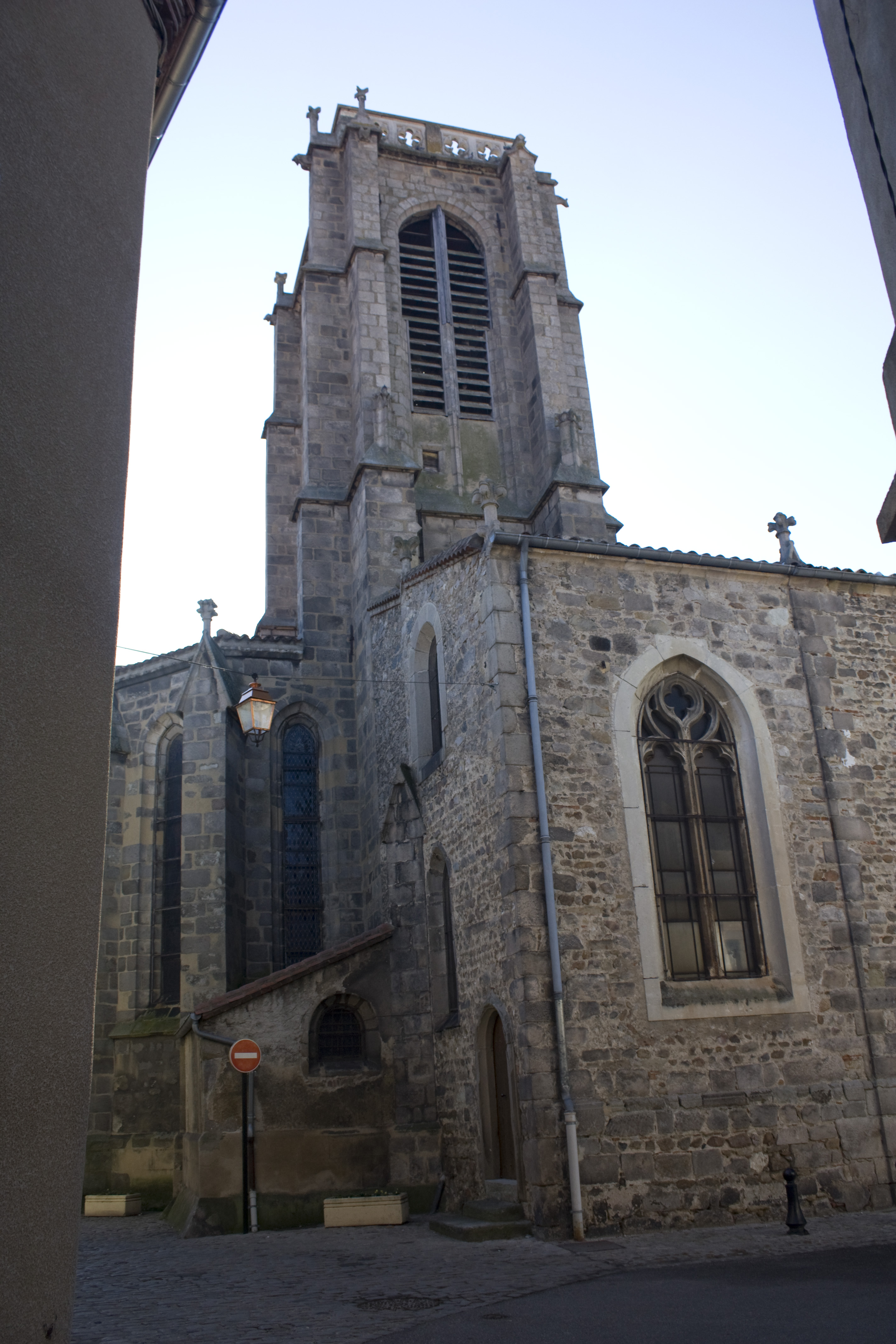

- Coat of arms
- Location of Sury-le-Comtal
- Location within France Location within Auvergne-Rhône-Alpes
- Coordinates: 45°32′18″N 4°11′02″E
- Country: France
- Region: Auvergne-Rhône-Alpes
- Department: Loire
- Arrondissement: Montbrison
- Canton: Saint-Just-Saint-Rambert
- Intercommunality: Loire Forez Agglomération

Government
  - Mayor (2020–2026): Yves Martin
- Area^{1}: 24.18 km^{2} (9.34 sq mi)
- Elevation: 384 m (1,260 ft)
- Highest elevation: 457 m (1,499 ft)
- Lowest elevation: 360 m (1,180 ft)
- Population (2023): 6,621
  - Density: 273.8/km^{2} (709.2/sq mi)
- Time zone: UTC+01:00 (CET)
  - Summer (DST): UTC+02:00 (CEST)
- INSEE/Postal code: 42304 /42450
- ^{1} French Land Register data, which excludes lakes, ponds, glaciers > 1 km^{2} (0.386 sq mi or 247 acres) and river estuaries.

Sury-le-Comtal (French pronunciation: [syʁi lə kɔ̃tal]) is a commune in the Loire department in central France.

== Population ==
Historical population

Year	Pop.	±% p.a.
1793	1,700	—
1800	1,783	+0.68%
1806	1,879	+0.88%
1821	2,353	+1.51%
1831	2,456	+0.43%
1836	2,461	+0.04%
1841	2,454	−0.06%
1846	2,593	+1.11%
1851	2,701	+0.82%
1856	2,643	−0.43%
1861	2,770	+0.94%
1866	2,806	+0.26%
1872	2,654	−0.92%
1876	2,782	+1.18%
1881	2,764	−0.13%
1886	2,995	+1.62%
1891	2,863	−0.90%
1896	2,718	−1.03%
1901	2,772	+0.39%

Year	Pop.	±% p.a.
1906	2,884	+0.80%
1911	2,981	+0.66%
1921	2,996	+0.05%
1926	3,121	+0.82%
1931	3,123	+0.01%
1936	2,883	−1.59%
1946	2,945	+0.21%
1954	3,080	+0.56%
1962	3,385	+1.19%
1968	3,587	+0.97%
1975	3,778	+0.74%
1982	4,200	+1.52%
1990	4,592	+1.12%
1999	4,805	+0.51%
2007	5,329	+1.30%
2012	5,979	+2.33%
2017	6,552	+1.85%
2023	6,621	+0.17%

Source: EHESS and INSEE (1968-2023)

== Personalities ==
- Antoine Blanc (1792–1860) archbishop of New Orleans (Louisiana)

== See also ==
- Communes of the Loire department
