= Jean Joseph Vaudechamp =

French painter

Jean Vaudechamp
- Born: 20 December 1790; Rambervillers, France
- Died: 1866 (aged 75–76); Neuilly-sur-Seine, France
- Notable work: Antoine Jacques Philippe de Marigny de Mandeville (portrait); Portrait of Two Children

Jean Joseph Vaudechamp (21 December 1790 – 1866) was a French painter born in Rambervillers, Vosges. He was a pupil of Anne-Louis Girodet de Roussy-Trioson.

== New Orleans ==
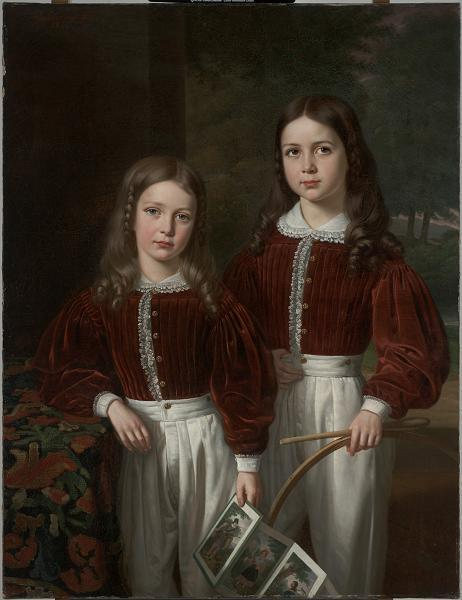
Portrait of two Children, 1841, Dallas Museum of Art

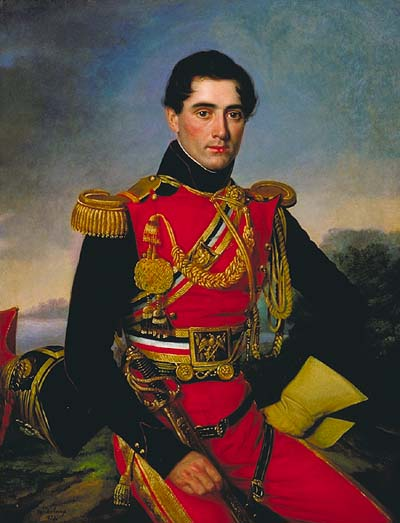
Vaudechamp's portrait of Antoine Jacques Philippe de Marigny de Mandeville (1833)

The market in Paris was competitive, so in the winter of 1831–1832, he went to try his fortunes in New Orleans, Louisiana. The Louisiana Creole people identified with French culture and selected Vaudechamp to paint portraits for them. Over the next ten years he spent winters in New Orleans, and was a leading portrait painter in the region. He died at Neuilly-sur-Seine in 1866.
