= Antoine Blanc =

Roman Catholic archbishop

The Most Reverend Antoine Blanc
- Archbishop of New Orleans
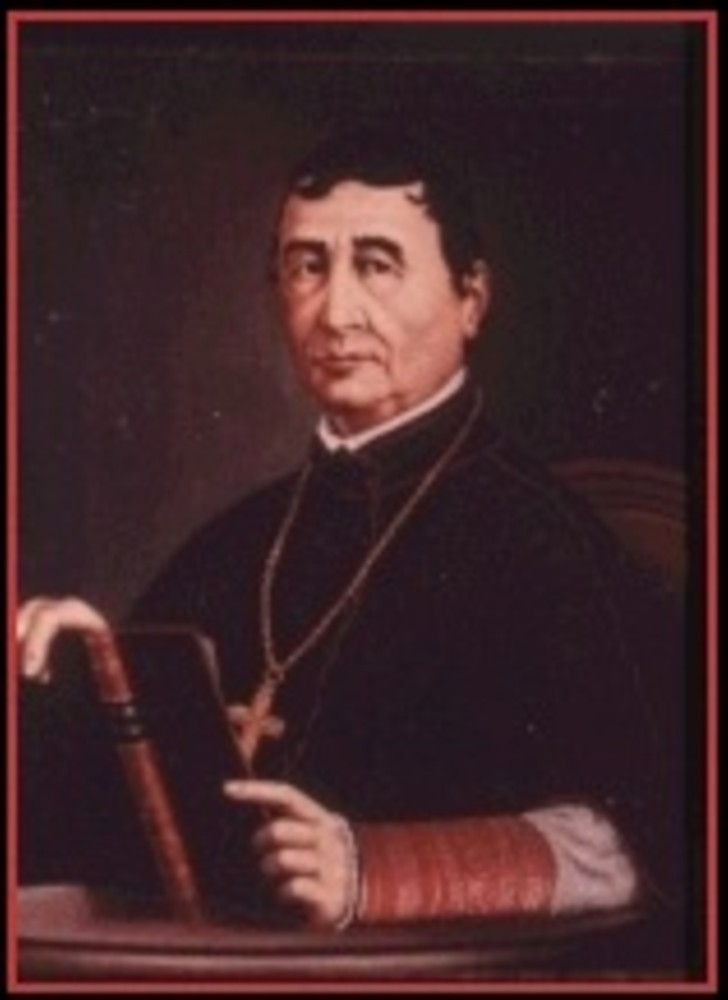
- Church: Roman Catholic Church
- Archdiocese: Archdiocese of New Orleans
- See: Roman Catholic Archdiocese of New Orleans
- Installed: 19 June 1835
- Term ended: 20 June 1860
- Predecessor: Leo-Raymond de Neckere CM
- Successor: Jean-Marie Odin CM

Orders
- Ordination: 22 July 1816 by Cardinal Joseph Fesch
- Consecration: 22 November 1835 by Joseph Rosati CM

Personal details
- Born: 11 October 1792 Sury-le-Comtal, Rhône-et-Loire, French First Republic
- Died: 20 June 1860 (aged 67) New Orleans, Louisiana, United States
- Buried: St. Louis Cathedral, New Orleans, Louisiana, United States

Antoine Blanc (11 October 1792 – 20 June 1860) was the fifth Bishop and first Archbishop of the Roman Catholic Archdiocese of New Orleans. His tenure, during which the diocese was elevated to an archdiocese, was at a time of growth in the city, which he matched with the most rapid church expansion in the history of New Orleans. More new parishes were established in New Orleans under his episcopacy than at any other time.

== Early life and education ==
Antoine Blanc was born in Sury, near Sury-le-Comtal, then in the Department of Rhône-et-Loire, France. He attended the seminary at Sury-le-Comtal and was ordained in 1816. On 1 July 1817 he embarked from Bordeaux with Louis William Valentine Dubourg Bishop of the Diocese of Louisiana and the Two Floridas, who had traveled to Europe to recruit clergy. They arrived in Annapolis, Maryland in September. Blanc and a number of seminarians stayed with Charles Carroll of Carrollton until the end of October when they joined Dubourg in Baltimore. From Baltimore, they travelled on foot to Pittsburgh, the stage proving too dangerous. From there, they took a flatboat to Louisville, Kentucky, arriving on 30 November. They reached Bardstown, Kentucky on 2 December.

== Missioner ==
The following April, Blanc and Father Jeanjean were assigned to the mission at Vincennes, Indiana. Father Jeanjean was soon recalled. Blanc proceeded to build a log chapel at a French settlement on the Illinois side of the Wabash, about twelve miles from Vincennes. Dubourg lent Blanc's services to Benedict Joseph Flaget, Bishop of the Diocese of Bardstown, whose area included most of Kentucky, Tennessee, Missouri, Illinois, Indiana, Ohio, and Michigan.

In February 1820, Blanc was recalled to New Orleans, and then assigned first to Natchez, then St. Francis Chapel at Point Coupee, Louisiana, with its mission chapels in the Felicianas and the Plains on the east side of the Mississippi River) and then at St. Joseph Church in Baton Rouge. In 1827, Blanc, Armand Duplantier, Fulwar Skipwith, Thomas B. Robertson and Sébastien Hiriart received permission from the state legislature to organize a corporation called the Agricultural Society of Baton Rouge.

== Bishop ==
In December 1831, Bishop De Neckere appointed Blanc associate vicar-general of the diocese of New Orleans. Bishop De Neckere died in 1833, and Blanc was appointed administrator until October 1835 when he received the bulls naming him Bishop of New Orleans. Blanc's jurisdiction included the states of Louisiana and Mississippi, to which Texas was added in 1838. Later the territory was reduced when the Diocese of Natchez was established in 1837. In 1853 the Diocese of Natchitoches was founded in the northern part of Louisiana. Growth in New Orleans and the region took all of Blanc's attention.

In 1850, the Diocese of New Orleans was raised to become an archdiocese, and Blanc became its first archbishop. St. Louis Cathedral remained its cathedral.

Monsignor Blanc invited the Jesuits and Lazarites to Louisiana to establish seminaries for the training of priests. He also invited the Redemptorists and the Christian Brothers. He also wanted to establish convents and schools for girls. He invited the Sisters of Charity, the Sisters of Notre Dame, the Good Shepherd Sisters, and the congregations of Our Lady of Mount Carmel and the Holy Cross. These new communities of Catholic workers helped the communities and took care of their populations during epidemics and other trials.

Blanc also blocked the congregation of Black sisters known now as the Sisters of the Holy Family, founded by Henriette DeLille, from publicly wearing a habits or taking public vows.

Blanc also supported the new congregations of English-speaking American migrants and Irish immigrants who had become established in New Orleans and the states since the Louisiana Purchase, as well as French- and English-speaking Blacks. By 1832 New Orleans had grown to be the fourth-largest city in the nation after New York, Philadelphia, and Boston.

The crisis of a yellow fever epidemic resulted in fatalities of 5% of the population of New Orleans.

Blanc died in 1860 in New Orleans while still in office.

== Legacy and honors ==
Blanc's institution building during the rapid growth of New Orleans and the states resulted in the number of churches increasing from 26 to 73, and of priests from 27 to 92. Under his leadership, many schools, academies, colleges, convents, and asylums were established.

- The Archbishop Antoine Blanc Memorial at 1100 Chartres Street was named in his honor and holds the archives of the archdiocese.
- The Archbishop Antoine Blanc Assembly # 2047 of the Knights of Columbus, located in New Roads, LA is named in his honor.

Catholic Church titles
Preceded by (Archdiocese created)	Archbishop of New Orleans; 1850–1860	Succeeded by Jean-Marie Odin
Preceded by Leo-Raymond de Neckere	Bishop of New Orleans; 1835–1850	Succeeded by None
