= Henry S. Thibodaux =

American politician (1769–1827)

Henry Thibodaux
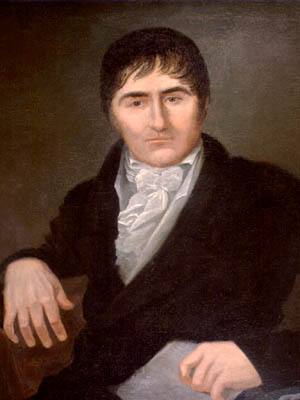
- Portrait circa. 1810

4th Governor of Louisiana
- In office November 15, 1824 – December 13, 1824
- Preceded by: Thomas B. Robertson
- Succeeded by: Henry Johnson

President of the Louisiana State Senate
- In office 1822–1824
- Preceded by: Bernard de Marigny
- Succeeded by: Arnaud Beauvais

Member of the Louisiana State Senate
- In office 1812–1824

Personal details
- Born: 1769 Albany, New York
- Died: October 24, 1827 (aged 58) Thibodaux, Louisiana, U.S.
- Party: National Republican
- Spouse(s): Felicité Bonvillain; Bridgette Marie Bélanger
- Children: 10, including Bannon

Henry Schuyler Thibodaux (1769 – October 24, 1827) was a politician who served as the interim governor of Louisiana from November until December 1824. After Governor Thomas Robertson resigned to become a federal judge, Thibodaux as the President of the Louisiana Senate assumed office as the fourth governor of the state.

== Early life ==
Henry Thibodaux was born in 1769 in Albany, New York to Anna Blanchard Thibodaux and Alexis Thibodaux, both Acadian exiles. He was orphaned at a young age and adopted by General Philip Schuyler, an American Revolutionary War hero. Thibodaux spent his childhood in the United States and is believed to have been sent to Scotland for his education.

After returning to the United States, Thibodaux moved to Spanish Louisiana in 1790 where he settled in the area around Bayou Lafourche. On May 7, 1793, he married Félicité Bonvillain of the First Acadian Coast in what is now St. James Parish.

== Marriage and family ==
Thibodaux was married twice, first to a Cajun woman, Félicité Bonvillain, with whom he had three children. After her death in 1799, he married Brigitte Belanger of Pointe Coupee on June 3, 1800. He had seven children with Brigitte, among the sons was Bannon Goforth Thibodeaux, who was elected as a Whig to the U.S. House of Representatives in the 1840s.

== Political career ==
Thibodaux moved from St. James Parish to Lafourche Parish when he received a land grant from Spanish Governor Baron de Carondelet. After the Louisiana Purchase, he developed the area into a sugar plantation he named St. Brigitte after his second wife. He began his political career after being elected to the legislature of the Territory of Orleans in 1805. He became justice of the peace for Lafourche Parish in 1808 and was a delegate to the state constitutional convention after Louisiana was admitted as a state in 1812. He served in the Louisiana militia with the rank of 1st Lieutenant in DeClouet's Regiment and was present at the Battle of New Orleans.

Thibodaux served as a State Senator for twelve years representing Lafourche Parish and was elected as President of the Senate in 1824. When Governor Thomas B. Robertson resigned to accept an appointment as a federal judge, Thibodaux automatically succeeded him, serving as acting governor for one month. He stepped down after Henry Johnson was elected governor in 1824.

Thibodaux was campaigning for the 1828 gubernatorial election when he died on October 24, 1827, while touring near Bayou Terrebonne. He was interred at St. Bridget Catholic Cemetery in Schriver, Louisiana.

== Legacy and honors ==
- The city of Thibodaux, Louisiana, was named for him.

Political offices
Preceded by Thomas B. Robertson	Governor of Louisiana; 1824	Succeeded by Henry Johnson
