= Agricultural Society of Baton Rouge =

The Agricultural Society of Baton Rouge was an agricultural organization established in Baton Rouge in 1827. The purpose of the society was as follows: "The sole and special objects of the said society shall be the improvement of agriculture, the amelioration of the breed of horses, of horned cattle, and others, and in all of the several branches relative to agriculture in a country."

The organization was founded by Fulwar Skipwith, Armand Duplantier, Antoine Blanc, Thomas B. Robertson, and Sebastien Hiriart. Membership was restricted to "free white persons of the age of twenty one years who now are or hereafter elected to" the society.

In 1828 the organization, led by its president Philip Hicky lobbied against the removal of a tax on West Indian sugar. The argument presented by the society included a summary of the economics of sugar production using unpaid enslaved African American labour. Hicky claimed that whereas some slave owners had made profits as much as $192.50 per enslaved African American, many had also profited by less than $150 per head. The society claimed that the removal of this tax would endanger the economic viability of 700 sugar plantations and $45m of estimated capital invested.
