= Feliciana Parish, Louisiana =

Former parish of Louisiana (1810–1824)

Coordinates: 30°52′15″N 91°12′52″W

Parish of New Feliciana, outlined in dark green - circa 1816

Feliciana Parish, or New Feliciana, French: Paroisse de Félicianne, was a parish of the Territory of Orleans and the state of Louisiana, formed in 1810 from West Florida territory. Given an increase in population, it was divided in 1824 into East Feliciana Parish and West Feliciana Parish.

Feliciana is a Spanish word meaning "happy land". Formerly part of the French La Louisiane, the area was settled largely by French colonists by about 1775, when it came under Spanish control during the American Revolutionary War. It was named by Spanish Governor Galvez. In 1777 he married a widow named Marie Félicité St. Maxent and honored her in the name.

The town of Jackson was founded in 1815 as the seat of justice for Feliciana Parish, before the parish was divided into two jurisdictions. The town also served as a land office and as a center for learning and culture. Legend holds that the town was originally called Bear Corners for the many wild black bears crossing nearby Thompson's Creek. It was named by Anglo-American settlers after General Andrew Jackson who reportedly camped there with his troops on the return trip from the Battle of New Orleans during the War of 1812.

== History ==
Aboriginal residents here at the time of European encounter were Tunica Indians. They had migrated into the area, displacing the native Houma people. Later, the Spanish explored and claimed the area. The French were not far behind, for LaSalle, having explored the Mississippi River in 1682, claimed all the lands (stole) drained by it in the name of Louis XIV.

In 1763, at the French and Indian War's end, Spain ceded Florida to Great Britain in exchange for rights in Cuba. Defeated by Britain, France ceded Louisiana and the Isle of Orleans to Spain, and territory east of the Mississippi River to Britain. The area that is now East and West Feliciana was later claimed by Britain as part of its West Florida colony. Encouraged by land grants given by the colony, emigrants, mainly from the English colonies, or from Great Britain, poured into West Florida to populate this frontier. By 1775, many Loyalists had migrated here from the British colonies, at a time of increasing tensions among colonists who wanted independence. They developed large, prosperous sugar cane plantations based on the labor of hundreds of enslaved African Americans.

Bernardo de Gálvez, Governor of Spanish Luisiana, recruited troops for the surprise attacks and capture of Fort Bute and Baton Rouge, both of which soon capitulated. Galvez also captured Natchez, Mobile, and Pensacola from British forces. At the end of the American Revolutionary War, Spain had regained both the West and East Florida colonies. Thus, the part of today's Louisiana which is east of the Mississippi River and north of Lake Pontchartrain fell under Spanish control, from about 1780 until 1810.

In 1800, Spain was compelled to cede Louisiana to France. After a failed effort to regain control of Haiti, in 1803, Napoleon sold Louisiana and its vast territories west of the Mississippi River to the United States in the Louisiana Purchase. The West Florida section of what is now the state of Louisiana, however, was not included; the Louisiana Purchase was vague as to defining its eastern boundary. Though President Jefferson insisted that this area was American, Spain disagreed and continued their occupation. (Since the 1760s, the eastern boundary of West Florida had been the Apalachicola River, and Pensacola was the capital.)

Feliciana colonists, unhappy under the Spanish regime, revolted in 1810 and established the short-lived Republic of West Florida. They petitioned President James Madison to annex the area. Their request was honored when, in October 1810, the Florida Parishes area was declared to be part of the Louisiana Purchase and an American possession.

The United States initially established "Feliciana County" as part of the Territory of Orleans, later subdividing it to form four parishes: New Feliciana, East Baton Rouge, St. Helena, and St. Tammany. In 1812, Louisiana was admitted to the Union, with Feliciana Parish included.

Addressing complaints that citizens of western Feliciana Parish found it difficult to travel during bad weather to the parish seat of Jackson in the eastern section, in 1824 the state legislature divided the area into East and West Feliciana parishes. This was also in recognition of the increased population in the area. At that point, two new parish seats were selected, Clinton in East Feliciana and St. Francisville in West Feliciana.

== Adjacent parishes/counties ==
- Wilkinson County, Mississippi (north)
- Amite County, Mississippi (northeast)
- St. Helena Parish (east)
- East Baton Rouge Parish (south)
- Pointe Coupee Parish (west)
- Avoyelles Parish (northwest)
- Concordia Parish (northwest)

== See also ==
- List of parishes in Louisiana
- West Florida Controversy
- Republic of West Florida
- Florida Parishes
