= 1820 Louisiana gubernatorial election =

- July 5, 1820
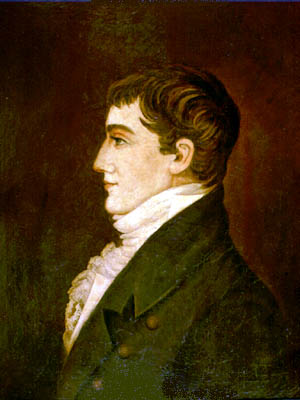

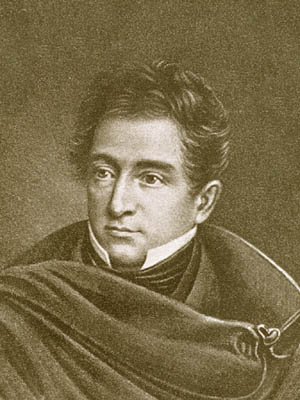

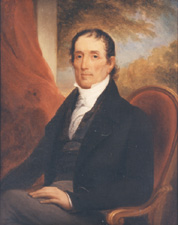
Nominee	Thomas B. Robertson	Pierre Derbigny
Party	Democratic-Republican	Democratic-Republican
Electoral vote	49	0
Popular vote	1,903	1,187
Percentage	40.08%	25.00%
Nominee	Abner L. Duncan	Jean Noel Destréhan
Party	Democratic-Republican	Democratic-Republican
Electoral vote	0	0
Popular vote	1,031	627
Percentage	21.71%	13.21%
Governor before election
Jacques Villeré
Democratic-Republican
Elected Governor
Thomas B. Robertson
Democratic-Republican

The 1820 Louisiana gubernatorial election was the third gubernatorial election to take place after Louisiana achieved statehood. Under Article III Sec 2 of the 1812 Constitution of the State of Louisiana the Governor was elected in two steps. On the first Monday in July, eligible voters went to the polls and voted. The returns were sent to the President of the Louisiana State Senate. On the second day of the session of the Louisiana State Legislature, the Louisiana House of Representatives and Senate met in joint session and voted between the top two candidates. The candidate who received a majority in General Assembly became governor.

== Results ==
Popular Vote

Candidate	Votes received	Percentage
Thomas B. Robertson	1,903	40.08%
Pierre Derbigny	1,187	25.00%
Abner L. Duncan	1,031	21.71%
Jean Noel Destréhan	627	13.21%
Total Vote	4,748	

General Assembly Vote

Candidate	Votes received	Percentage
Thomas B. Robertson	49	96.08%
Blank	2	3.92%
Total Vote	51	

Preceded by 1816 Louisiana gubernatorial election	Louisiana gubernatorial elections	Succeeded by 1824 Louisiana gubernatorial election
