= Antoine James de Marigny =

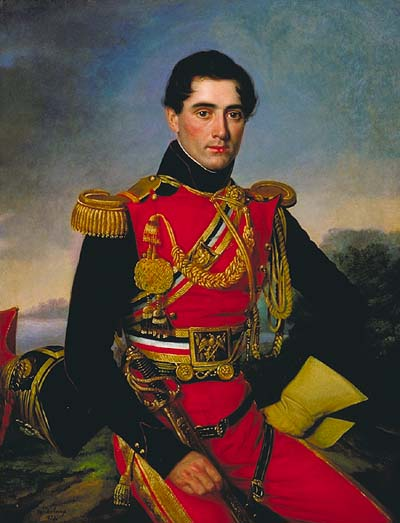
- Portrait of Mandeville in French uniform by Jean Joseph Vaudechamp, 1833.
- Born: November 21, 1811; New Orleans, Territory of Orleans
- Died: June 3, 1890 (age 78); New Orleans, Louisiana
- Military career
- Allegiance: France; Confederate States
- Branch: French Army; Confederate States Army
- Rank: Colonel
- Unit: 10th Louisiana Infantry
- Conflicts: American Civil War

Antoine Jacques Philippe de Marigny de Mandeville (21 Nov 1811 – 3 June 1890) was a Creole military officer, merchant, planter and U.S. Marshal for eastern Louisiana. He was the son of prominent New Orleans businessman and politician Bernard de Marigny.

== Biography ==
He was born Antoine Jacques Philippe de Marigny de Mandeville in New Orleans on November 21, 1811 to Bernard de Marigny and his second wife Anna Mathilde Morales. He was sent to France as a young man where he attended the Academy of St. Cyr on the recommendation of King Louis Philippe, a friend of the Marigny family, and the Royal Cavalry School at Saumur in the early 1830s. He then served two to three years in the French military as a lieutenant in the cavalry.

Returning to New Orleans, he married Sophronie Louise Claiborne, daughter of Governor William C. C. Claiborne and his third wife, Cayetana Susana "Suzette" Bosque y Fangui on April 12, 1835 at St. Mary's Church. The couple had two daughters who died in infancy, Marie Felicité and Felicité Medora, and a son, James Mandeville Marigny (1849-1884).

During the American Civil War, Antoine served in the Confederate Army as a colonel in the 10th Louisiana Infantry ('French Brigade', 'French Legion') and served in Virginia. According to General McLaws, Antoine "spoke English, but indifferently well" and by July 1862 he resigned from his command, citing favoritism in the War Department.

After the war, he found work as a broker in New Orleans while residing for much of his life in St. Tammany Parish, on the north shore of Lake Pontchartrain. In the 1870 U.S. Census, he is listed there in the community of Lewisburg. He died on June 3, 1890 and is buried in St. Louis Cemetery No. 1.
