= Republic of West Florida =

1810 unrecognized republic in Spanish West Florida

State of Florida República de Florida Occidental (Spanish) République de Floride occidentale (French) Repiblik Lwès Florid (Louisiana Creole)
- 1810
- Flag

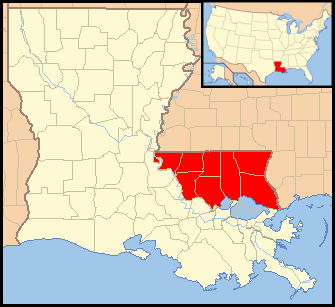
- Status: Unrecognized state
- Capital: St. Francisville
- Government: Republic
- Governor
  - 1810: Fulwar Skipwith
- Legislature: Senate and House of Representatives
- Historical era: U.S. westward expansion
  - Rebel capture of Fort San Carlos at Baton Rouge: September 23, 1810
  - Declaration of independence from Spain: September 26, 1810
  - Madison proclaims "possession should be taken"; sends Claiborne to do so: October 27, 1810
  - St. Francisville acquiesces to U.S. Army: December 6, 1810
  - Surrender of Baton Rouge to U.S. Army: December 10, 1810
Preceded by	Succeeded by
New Spain; Spanish West Florida	Territory of Orleans; New Spain
- Today part of: United States ∟ Louisiana; On July 17, 1821, Spain's governor of its West Florida province formally delivered it to U.S. General Andrew Jackson under the Adams–Onís Treaty.

The Republic of West Florida (Spanish: República de Florida Occidental, French: République de Floride occidentale), officially the State of Florida, was a short-lived unrecognized republic in the western region of Spanish West Florida for just over 2 1/2 months during 1810. In December 1810, the United States occupied and annexed the Republic of West Florida. The governor of Orleans Territory designated the land comprising it as the County of Feliciana. The land was added to Louisiana on August 4, 1812, following an act of Congress passed earlier that year. In 1990, the region that was previously the Republic of West Florida was officially recognized as a historical region of the U.S., the "Republic of West Florida Historic Region", commonly referred to as the Florida Parishes.

== History ==
Before 1762, France owned and administered the land west of the Perdido River as part of La Louisiane. In 1762, France signed a secret treaty with Spain that effectively ceded all French lands west of the Mississippi River, plus the Isle of New Orleans, to Spain. At the end of the Seven Years' War in 1763, France ceded its remaining lands east of the Mississippi River (which included the land between the Perdido and Mississippi Rivers) to Great Britain, while Spain ceded its Florida territory to Britain.

Twenty years later, at the conclusion of the American Revolutionary War in 1783, Spain received both East and West Florida from Great Britain. The United States and Spain held long negotiations regarding the northern border of West Florida, concluding with Pinckney's Treaty in 1795.

In 1800, under duress from Napoleon of France, Spain ceded Louisiana and the island of New Orleans back to France, which promised to return them to Spain should France ever relinquish them. This cession did not include West Florida. In 1803, France then sold Louisiana and New Orleans to the United States in the Louisiana Purchase. The U.S. claimed that West Florida was part of the Louisiana Purchase, a claim disputed by Spain, as it had controlled West Florida as a province separate from Spanish Louisiana since 1783.

There was an influx of Americans into West Florida in the early years of the 19th century. The population of the Baton Rouge District was almost exclusively Anglo-American with a substantial number of Tory immigrants of the revolutionary period. Some of the Americans were land speculators eager to profit should the territory join the U.S.

During the decade after 1803, the U.S. southern border was the scene of many minor frontier events that involved diplomatic relations with Britain, France and Spain. In order to resolve the problems along that border and gain control of ports for commerce, the U.S. desired to possess all territory east of the Mississippi. West Florida occupied the land from the Mississippi River to beyond the Mobile River and also separated the United States' Orleans and Mississippi territories. (New Orleans and West Florida had been the prime U.S. desires in the negotiations with Napoleon that resulted instead in the Louisiana Purchase.)

=== West Florida Revolt ===
In West Florida, from June to September 1810, many secret meetings, as well as three openly held conventions, of those who resented Spanish rule and the new district governor, Carlos de Hault de Lassus, took place in the Baton Rouge District. Out of those meetings grew the West Florida rebellion and the establishment of the independent Republic of West Florida. Its capital was located at St. Francisville, in present-day Louisiana on a bluff along the Mississippi River.

Early in the morning on September 23, 1810, armed rebels organized by Philemon Thomas stormed Fort San Carlos at Baton Rouge and killed two Spanish soldiers and captured de Lassus "in a sharp and bloody firefight that wrested control of the region from the Spanish". The rebels unfurled the flag of the new republic, a single white star on a blue field made by Melissa Johnson, wife of Major Isaac Johnson, commander of the Feliciana cavalry engaged in the attack. (The "Bonnie Blue Flag" that was flown fifty years later at the start of the American Civil War resembles it.)

After the successful attack, plans were made to take Mobile and Pensacola from the Spanish and incorporate the eastern part of the province into the new republic. Reuben Kemper led a small force in an attempt to capture Mobile, but the expedition ended in failure.

For some time, the governors of the Orleans and Mississippi territories, William C. C. Claiborne and David Holmes, respectively, had been U.S. President James Madison's two chief agents in securing intelligence on West Florida. Upon learning of the revolt, Madison wanted to move quickly to annex the district but knew he could not use the military without congressional approval. Congress would not meet until December 1810. Military occupation would incur the wrath of Spain and perhaps also Britain and France. He feared if he did not move, West Florida could fall into unfriendly hands, as a considerable part of the population had previously been British subjects.

Though troubled by "constitutional qualms", Madison did not want to let the opportunity pass unexploited and "resorted to the oldest justification in the political book: he acted, even without [clear authority] on the grounds that 'a crisis has at length arrived subversive of the order of things under the Spanish authorities'". Madison issued a proclamation of annexation on October 27. Critics quickly condemned the president "for acting without proper authority and for supplanting the jurisdiction of the Spanish, friends who had done nothing to deserve such aggression".

Support for the revolt was far from unanimous. The presence of competing pro-Spanish, pro-American, and pro-independence factions, as well as the presence of scores of foreign agents, contributed to a "virtual civil war within the Revolt as the competing factions jockeyed for position". The faction that favored the continued independence of West Florida secured the adoption of a constitution at a convention in October. The convention had earlier commissioned an army under Philemon Thomas to march across the territory, subdue opposition to the insurrection, and seek to secure as much Spanish-held territory as possible. "Residents of the western Florida Parishes proved largely supportive of the Revolt, while the majority of the population in the eastern region of the Florida Parishes opposed the insurrection. Thomas' army violently suppressed opponents of the revolt, leaving a bitter legacy in the Tangipahoa and Tchefuncte River regions."

William C. C. Claiborne and David Holmes had to contend with the armed force under Thomas and the fact that those in control were determined not to submit to the United States without terms in regard to land titles and to refugees. The two governors took steps to prepare the minds of the people to receive them and at the same time to overwhelm possible opposition by a show of force.

On November 7, Fulwar Skipwith was elected as governor, together with members of a bicameral legislature. Skipwith was a cotton planter who lived just north of Baton Rouge. He was appointed by George Washington in 1795 to the staff of James Monroe, the U.S. ambassador to France, and was a consul general to France under President Thomas Jefferson. Shortly after moving to Baton Rouge in 1809, he became involved in the effort to free West Florida from Spanish domination. The former American diplomat had helped negotiate the Louisiana Purchase. In his inaugural address, Skipwith mentioned the possibility of annexation to the United States:

... wherever the voice of justice and humanity can be heard, our declaration and our just rights will be respected. But the blood which flows in our veins, like the tributary streams which form and sustain the father of rivers, encircling our delightful country, will return if not impeded, to the heart of our parent country. The genius of Washington, the immortal founder of the liberties of America, stimulates that return, and would frown upon our cause, should we attempt to change its course.

As governor, Skipwith personally directed the preparations for the dispatch of the armed force to wrest the remainder of West Florida from Spain. Skipwith's inauguration ceremony was held on November 29. A week later, he and many of his fellow officials still lingered at St. Francisville preparing to go to Baton Rouge, where the next session of the legislature was to consider his ambitious program. The impending takeover apparently came as a surprise to Skipwith when Holmes and his party approached the town. Holmes persuaded all except a few leaders, including Skipwith and Philemon Thomas, the leader of the West Florida troops, to acquiesce to American authority.

Skipwith complained bitterly to Holmes that, as a result of seven years of U.S. tolerance of continued Spanish occupation, the United States had abandoned its right to the country and that the West Florida people would not now submit to the American government without conditions. Skipwith and several of his unreconciled legislators then departed for the fort at Baton Rouge, rather than surrender the country unconditionally and without terms.

=== U.S. occupation ===
At Baton Rouge on December 9, Skipwith informed Holmes that he would no longer resist but could not speak for the troops in the fort. Their commander was John Ballinger, who upon the assurance of Holmes that his troops would not be harmed, agreed to surrender the fort. Claiborne and his forces landed two miles above the town. Holmes reported to Claiborne that "the armed citizens ... are ready to retire from the fort and acknowledge the authority of the United States" without insisting upon any terms. Claiborne agreed to a respectful ceremony to mark the formal act of transfer. Thus, at 2:30 p.m. that afternoon, December 10, 1810, "the men within the fort marched out and stacked their arms and saluted the flag of West Florida as it was lowered for the last time, and then dispersed".

Skipwith later expressed his gratitude at the result of the intervention, but he criticized bitterly the method by which Madison and Claiborne had brought it about. He stated his belief that a surrender of the territory by "the constitutional authorities thereof as an independent state" was the only method that could give the United States "an unqualified and legal title" to its possession. Claiborne himself reported that much of the resentment aroused among the people in West Florida by Madison's proclamation arose from the fact that it was not thought to be sufficiently respectful toward their constituted officials.

Congress passed a joint resolution, approved January 15, 1811, to provide for the temporary occupation of the disputed territory and declaring that the territory should remain subject to future negotiation. On March 11, 1811, rebellious elements again raised the Lone Star flag of the West Florida Republic, forcing Governor Claiborne to dispatch troops to enforce his authority. Spain did not agree to relinquish its title to any of the West Florida territory occupied by the United States until 1819, upon the signing of the Adams–Onís Treaty.

=== Artifacts ===
The Constitution of the Republic of West Florida was based largely on the United States Constitution, and divided the government into three branches: executive, judicial, and legislative. The legislature consisted of a Senate and House of Representatives. The Governor was chosen by the legislature. According to the constitution, the official name of the country was the "State of Florida".

The marching song of the West Floridian army included these lyrics in verse six:

West Floriday, that lovely nation,
Free from king and tyranny,
Thru' the world shall be respected,
For her true love of Liberty.

== United States annexation ==
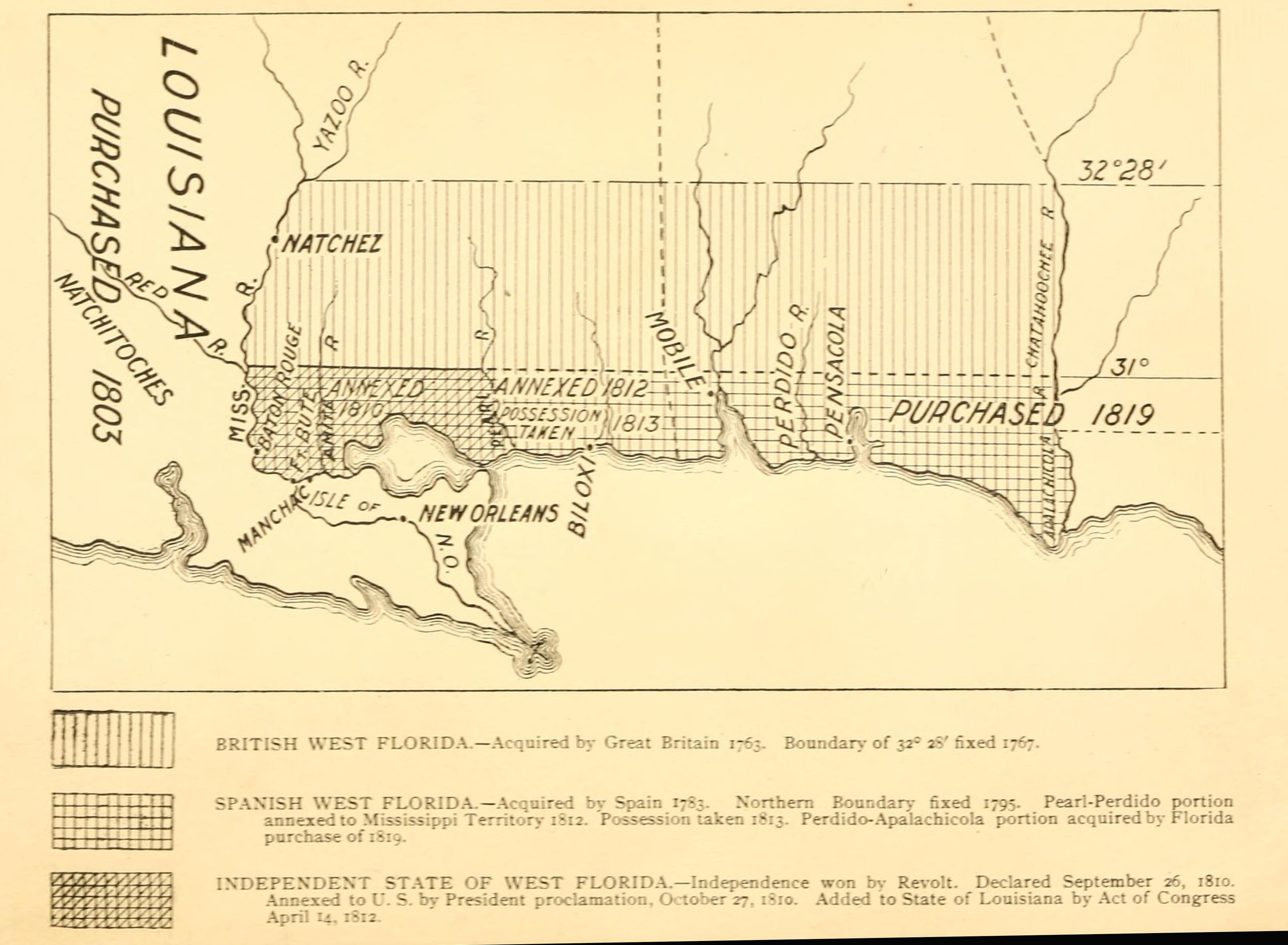
A sketch map published in 1898 showing the territorial changes of "West Florida"^{p 2}

The United States did not recognize the independence of the Republic of West Florida, and on October 27, 1810, James Madison proclaimed that the United States should take possession of it, on the basis that it was part of the Louisiana Purchase. In his proclamation, Madison invoked the portion of the Louisiana Purchase agreement that directly quoted the 1800 St. Ildefonso treaty between France and Spain: Louisiana, he stated, had "the same extent that it had in the hands of Spain, and that it had when France originally possessed it". However, neither the 1800 treaty nor the 1803 purchase includes the word "originally"; instead, they state, "with the same extent that it now has in the hands of Spain and that it had when France possessed it". Madison's tweak served his annexation rationale but had no basis in the treaty language.

William C. C. Claiborne was sent to take possession of the territory. The West Florida government opposed annexation, preferring to negotiate terms to join the Union. Skipwith proclaimed that he and his men would "surround the Flag-Staff and die in its defense".

Claiborne entered St. Francisville with a U.S. Army contingent of 300 from Fort Adams under Col. Leonard Covington on December 6, 1810, and Baton Rouge on December 10. After Claiborne refused to recognize the West Florida government, Skipwith and the legislature eventually agreed to accept Madison's annexation proclamation. Congress passed a joint resolution, approved January 15, 1811, to provide for the temporary occupation of the disputed territory and declaring that the territory should remain subject to future negotiation.

According to the French negotiator of the Louisiana Purchase, François Barbé-Marbois, "The Louisianans themselves agreed that [the Baton Rouge district] had been considered to belong to Florida, but, nevertheless, the [state legislature] declared, by one of its first acts that this district of country was a portion of Louisiana. ... but this eagerness to strengthen doubtful pretensions by possession, does not accord with the spirit of justice that characterizes the other political acts of the United States."

The Mobile District, now coastal Mississippi and Alabama, remained under Spanish control until the War of 1812 with Britain, with whom Spain was allied. On May 14, 1812, the claimed portion of West Florida east of the Pearl River was assigned to Mississippi Territory, though at the time, the area around Mobile Bay remained under the control of Spanish Florida. Following that Congressional declaration of annexation and an act of February 12, 1813, (3 Stat. L. 472) authorizing the President to occupy that area, U.S. General James Wilkinson sailed from New Orleans to Mobile in April 1813 with a force of 600, whereupon he received the surrender of the Spanish commander.

== Boundaries ==
The boundaries of the Republic of West Florida included all territory south of parallel 31°N, east of the Mississippi River, and north of the waterway formed by the Iberville River, Amite River, Lake Maurepas, Pass Manchac, Lake Pontchartrain, and the Rigolets. The Pearl River, with its branch that flowed into the Rigolets, formed the eastern boundary of the republic. A military expedition from the republic attempted but failed to capture the Spanish outpost at Mobile, which was situated between the Pearl and the Perdido River, farther to the east. Despite its name, none of the Republic of West Florida was within the borders of the present-day state of Florida, but rather entirely within the present borders of Louisiana.

Louisiana parishes once part of the Republic of West Florida are:

- East Baton Rouge Parish
- East Feliciana Parish
- Livingston Parish
- St. Helena Parish
- St. Tammany Parish
- Tangipahoa Parish
- Washington Parish
- West Feliciana Parish

The republic sought to control the Mobile District, which included these later Mississippi and Alabama counties; however, a military expedition led by Reuben Kemper failed. They remained under Spanish control until 1811 (Mississippi portion) and April 1813 (Alabama portion):

- Jackson County (which included George County before Jackson was split in 1900.)
- Hancock County (which included Pearl River County before Hancock was split in 1900.)
- Harrison County (which included Stone County before Harrison was split in 1900.)
- Mobile County
- Baldwin County

=== Baton Rouge District ===
The combined modern Louisiana parishes of East Baton Rouge, East Feliciana, St. Tammany, Tangipahoa, and West Feliciana formed the area referred to as the Baton Rouge District, which was annexed to the United States in 1810.

== Present day ==
In the state of Louisiana, the civil parishes (equivalent to counties elsewhere in the U.S.) that comprised the former Republic of West Florida are known today as the Florida Parishes. This is partly due to their short-lived independent state, but also in recognition of their heritage in a (British, then Spanish) colonial province extending eastward to modern Florida.

== See also ==
- Florida Parishes
- Fulwar Skipwith
- West Florida
- West Florida Controversy
- Spanish Florida
- Louisiana Territory
- List of historical unrecognized states and dependencies
- Dominion of British West Florida, 21st-century separatist micronation

== Bibliography ==
- Bice, David A. (2004). The Original Lone Star Republic: Scoundrels, Statesmen & Schemers of the 1810 West Florida Rebellion. Clanton, AL: Heritage Publishing. ISBN 9781891647819.
- Davis, William C. (2011). The Rogue Republic: How Would-Be Patriots Waged the Shortest Revolution in American History. Boston: Houghton Mifflin Harcourt. ISBN 9780151009251.
