= 1828 Louisiana gubernatorial election =

- July 9, 1828
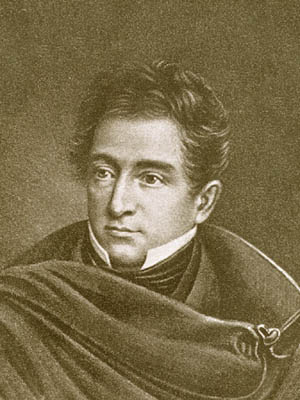

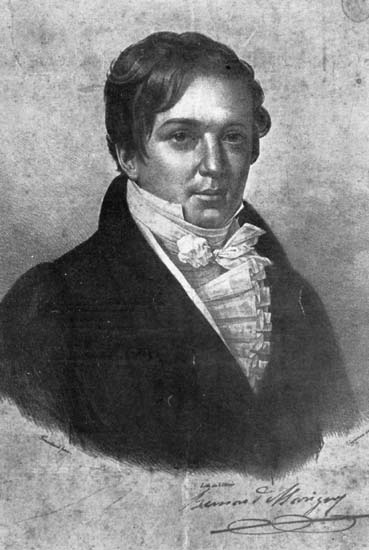

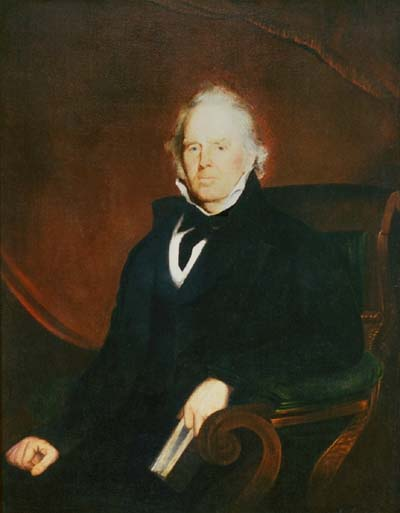
Nominee	Pierre Derbigny	Thomas Butler
Party	National Republican	National Republican
Electoral vote	55	1
Popular vote	3,372	1,562
Percentage	46.31%	21.45%
Nominee	Bernard de Marigny	Philemon Thomas
Party	Democratic	Democratic
Electoral vote	0	0
Popular vote	1,196	1,151
Percentage	16.43%	15.81%
Governor before election
Henry Johnson
National Republican
Elected Governor
Pierre Derbigny
National Republican

The 1828 Louisiana gubernatorial election was the fifth gubernatorial election to take place after Louisiana achieved statehood. Under Article III Sec 2 of the 1812 Constitution of the State of Louisiana the Governor was elected in two steps. On the first Monday in July, eligible voters went to the polls and voted. The returns were sent to the President of the Louisiana State Senate. On the second day of the session of the Louisiana State Legislature, the Louisiana House of Representatives and Senate met in joint session and voted between the top two candidates. The candidate who received a majority in General Assembly became governor.

== Results ==
Popular Vote

Candidate	Votes received	Percentage
Pierre Derbigny	3,372	46.31%
Thomas Butler	1,562	21.46%
Bernard de Marigny	1,196	16.43%
Philemon Thomas	1,151	15.81%
Total Vote	7,281	

General Assembly Vote

Candidate	Votes received	Percentage
Pierre Derbigny	55	96.49%
Thomas Butler	1	1.75%
Blank	1	1.75%
Total Vote	57	

Preceded by 1824 Louisiana gubernatorial election	Louisiana gubernatorial elections	Succeeded by 1830 Louisiana gubernatorial special election
