= Magnolia Mound Plantation House =

Historic house in Louisiana, United States

- U.S. National Register of Historic Places
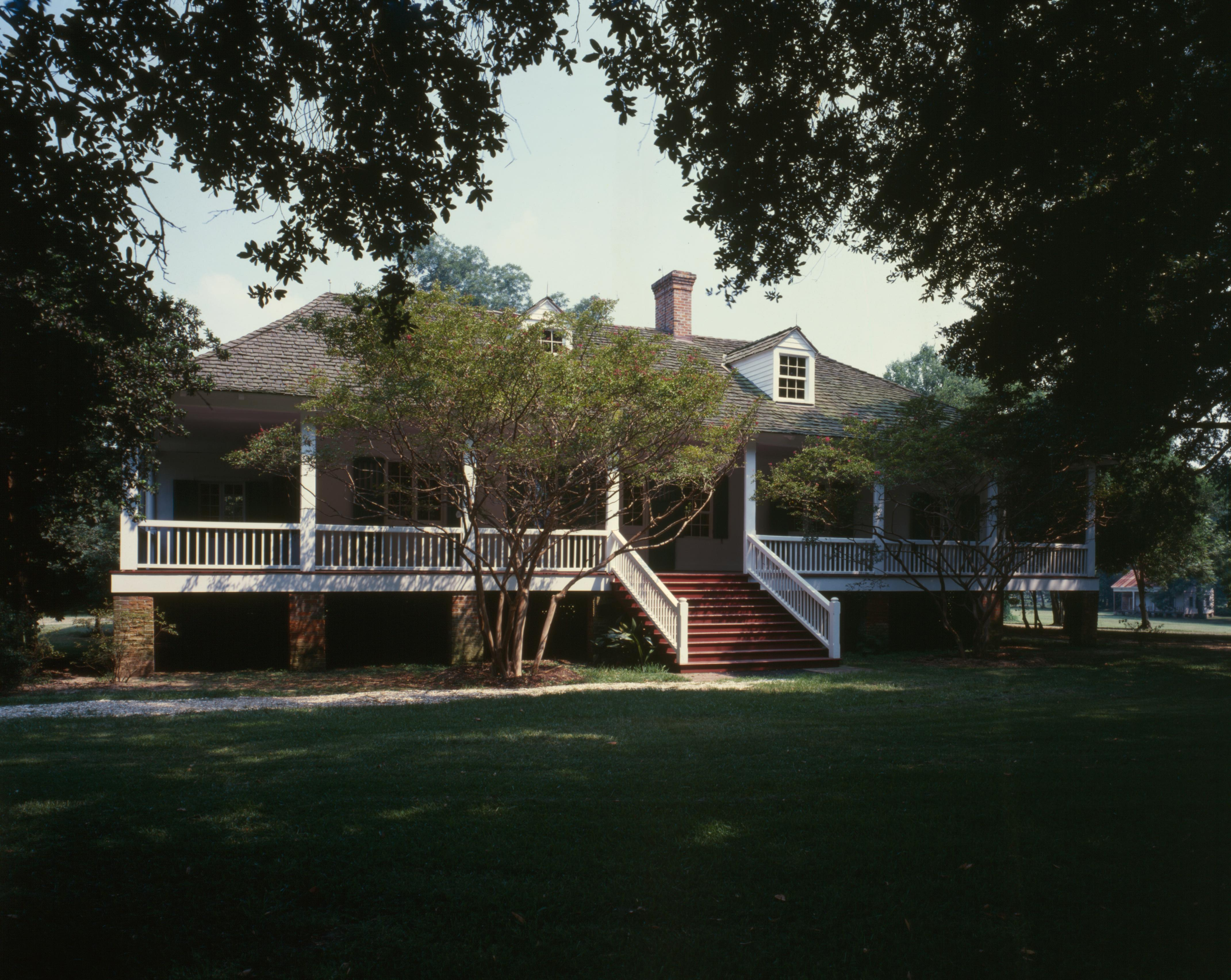
- Front of the house

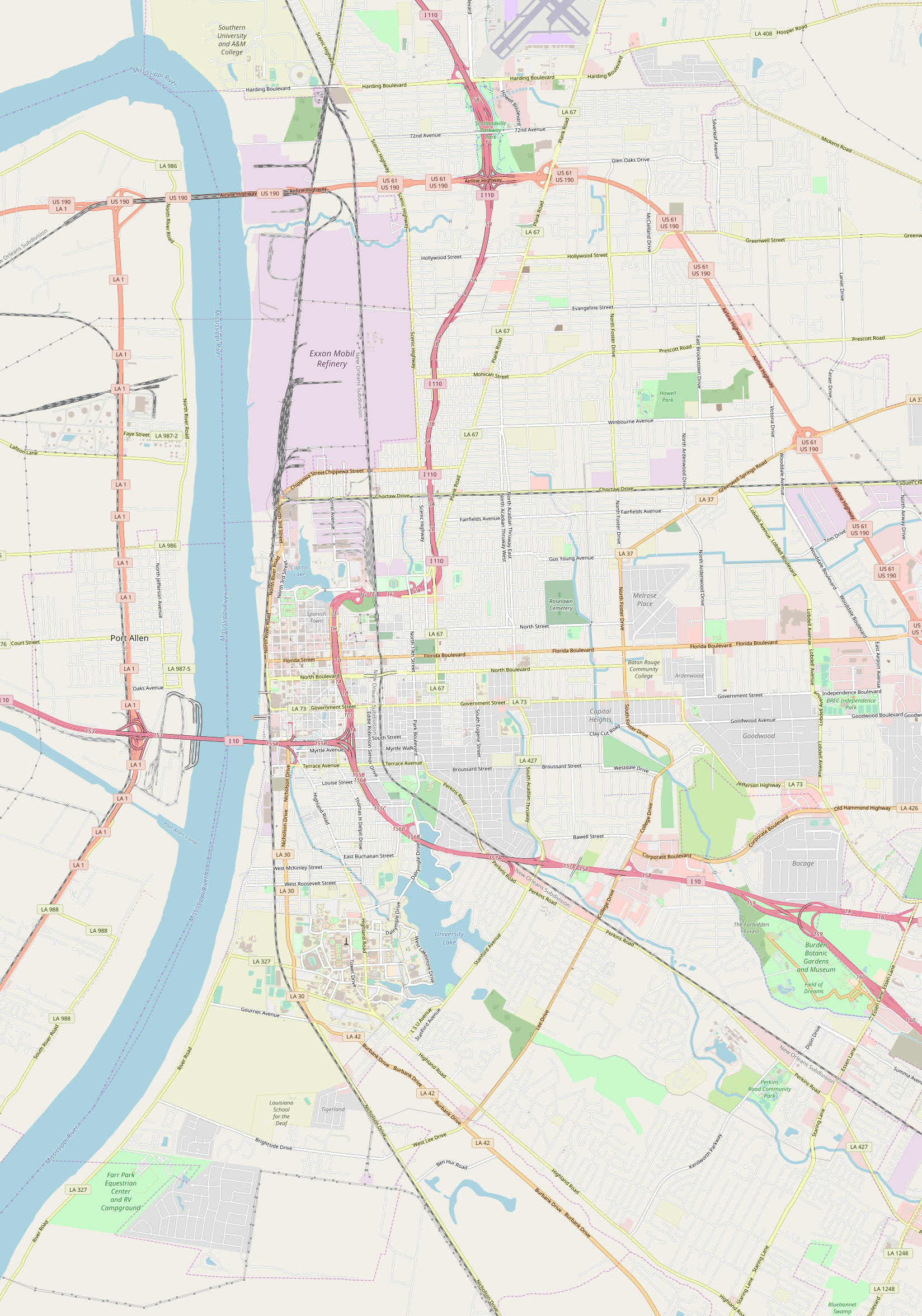
- Location within Baton Rouge
- Location: 2161 Nicholson Drive, Baton Rouge, Louisiana
- Coordinates: 30°25′35″N 91°11′14″W
- Area: 7 acres (2.8 ha)
- Built: 1786
- Architectural style: French Colonial
- NRHP reference No.: 72000549
- Added to NRHP: September 7, 1972

The Magnolia Mound Plantation House is a French Creole house constructed in 1791 near the Mississippi River in Baton Rouge, Louisiana. Many period documents refer to the plantation as Mount Magnolia. The house and several original outbuildings on the grounds of Magnolia Mound Plantation are examples of the vernacular architectural influences of early settlers from France and the West Indies. The complex is owned by the city of Baton Rouge and maintained by its Recreation Commission (BREC). It is located approximately one mile south of downtown.

The house was listed on the National Register of Historic Places on September 7, 1972.

== Early history ==
The plantation house, first a cottage, is one of the earliest buildings in the present-day city of Baton Rouge.

The land was owned originally by James Hillin, an early Scots settler who arrived in 1786, who lived there with wife Jane Stanley Hillin, five children, and six enslaved Africans: Thomas, John, Lucia, Catherine, Jenny, and Anna. On December 23, 1791, John Joyce, from County Cork, Ireland, purchased the 950-acre (3.8 km^{2}) property. He, his wife Constance Rochon and their children lived in Mobile, Alabama. By the time of his drowning, on May 9, 1798, during a sailing trip from New Orleans to Mobile, Joyce held about 50 slaves at the plantation, who cultivated indigo, tobacco, cotton, and sugarcane under the supervision of an overseer.

The widow Constance Rochon Joyce married the widower Armand Duplantier, an influential person in the area who had four surviving children from his first marriage and had managed a plantation in the vicinity of Pointe Coupee. She brought 54 slaves to the marriage from her estate. He was a former captain of the Continental Army under the Marquis de Lafayette. They had five children together. From 1802 to 1805, they enlarged the house to accommodate their large family, although they used it mostly as a country house. Armand Duplantier died in 1827.

Duplantier descendants owned the plantation until 1849; the property then had several owners through the late 19th century. At that time Louis Barillier sold the land and improvements to Robert A. Hart.

== After the Civil War ==
Edward J. Gay purchased the deed in the early 1860s and had several overseers run the plantation for him, including the years after the Civil War. In 1869, the manager was W.L. Larimore.

In the 20th century, Mrs. Blanche Duncan acquired Magnolia Mound Plantation through a family inheritance. In 1951, Mrs. Duncan commissioned the architectural firm of Goodman and Miller of Baton Rouge to do extensive alterations and additions.

After the property fell into disrepair, in 1966 the City of Baton Rouge exercised its right of eminent domain to purchase the house and 16 acres (6.5 ha), to preserve the house and its dependencies for their historic and architectural value. The property is a green space within the city.

== Architecture ==
The cottage was originally four rooms, with side-by-side room arrangement. About 1812 it was expanded to a seven or eight-room house, including an extension for a formal dining room and two service rooms. A "U-shaped" gallery was constructed during this second stage of development. The Duplantier family used it as a country house.

During the late 19th century, owners added rooms under the gallery on the north and south sides. The basic form of the house is rectangular with a large hip roof, which covers all rooms and galleries. During the early 19th century, double-hung windows were added.

The interior décor was altered during the early 20th century.

In 1998, the city installed an original, double slave cabin (c.1830) from Pointe Coupee Parish on the grounds to help interpret the lives of enslaved Africans. One half is furnished as it would have been in the early 19th century; the other half houses an exhibit on slave life in Louisiana.

Additional outbuildings, some original to the plantation, show how the operations of the plantation were supported:

Open-hearth kitchen - The city reconstructed a separate outdoor kitchen building based on archaeological evidence. It is authentically furnished with vintage utensils, such as spider pots, a clock-jack, sugar nips, waffle iron, olla jar, and reflector ovens.

Overseer's house - original to the plantation, c. 1870. Also individually enlisted in National Register of Historic Places as Magnolia Mound Plantation House Dependency.

Crop garden - The crop garden contains indigo, tobacco, cotton, and sugarcane, depicting Magnolia Mound's cash crops throughout its history.

Pigeonnier - A small pigeon house or dovecote, c.1825, typical of French Creole plantations, was used to house squab and various game birds. Today it again houses a collection of live pigeons. Also individually enlisted in National Register of Historic Places as Barthel Pigeonnier.

Carriage house - Holds a collection of vintage tools, as well as a weaver's workshop, which depict plantation crafts c.1800-1820.

== See also ==
- National Register of Historic Places listings in East Baton Rouge Parish, Louisiana
