= Fulwar Skipwith =

American politician (1765–1839)

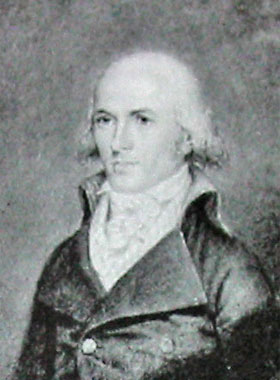

Governor of the Republic of West Florida
- In office November 29, 1810 – December 10, 1810
- Preceded by: Office established
- Succeeded by: Office abolished

Personal details
- Born: February 21, 1765 Dinwiddie County, Colony of Virginia, British America
- Died: January 7, 1839 (aged 73) Baton Rouge, Louisiana, U.S.
- Profession: Soldier, Diplomat, Politician, Farmer

Fulwar Skipwith (February 21, 1765 – January 7, 1839) was an American soldier, diplomat, politician and farmer. A veteran of the American Revolutionary War, he served as a U.S. Consul in Martinique, and later as the U.S. Consul-General in France. He was instrumental in negotiating the Louisiana Purchase in 1803, was the first and only governor of the Republic of West Florida in 1810, and was a founding member of the Agricultural Society of Baton Rouge.

== Early life ==
Skipwith was born into an influential family in Dinwiddie County in the Colony of Virginia on February 21, 1765.

His cousin, Henry Skipwith, was a brother-in-law to Thomas Jefferson, the U.S. President 1801–1809. Skipwith studied at the College of William & Mary, but left at age 16 to enlist in the army during the American Revolutionary War. He served at the Siege of Yorktown in 1781. After American independence was achieved, he entered the tobacco trade.

== Diplomatic career & family ==
Coat of Arms of Fulwar Skipwith

Following the French Revolution of 1789, Skipwith was appointed as US Consul to the French colony of Martinique in 1790. He experienced the turmoil of the Revolution, as well as the aftermath of the abortive slave insurrection in Martinique, before departing in 1793. In 1795, Skipwith was appointed Consul-General in Paris under the US Minister to France, James Monroe.

On June 2, 1802, Fulwar Skipwith married Evelina Louisa Barlié Van den Clooster, a Flemish baroness. Their children were Lelia, who married Thomas B. Robertson; Evelina, who married Edward H. Barton; and George Grey Skipwith.

Skipwith assisted Robert Livingston (known as "The Chancellor" for the high New York state legal office he held) in negotiating the Louisiana Purchase, and actively participated in the transfer of 828,000 square miles of land in its southern part.

== Republic of West Florida ==
Flag of the Republic of West Florida

In 1809, Skipwith moved to Spanish West Florida. As a member of the first West Florida judiciary, he took part in the 1810 West Florida rebellion against Spain, and served as Governor of the short-lived Republic of West Florida. On October 27, 1810, West Florida was annexed to the United States by proclamation of U.S. President James Madison, who claimed it as part of the Louisiana Purchase.

At first, Skipwith and the West Florida government – located in St. Francisville – were opposed to the proclamation, preferring to negotiate terms to join the Union as a separate state. However, the Territory of Orleans Governor, William C. C. Claiborne, who led armed troops to take possession in December 1810, refused to acknowledge the legitimacy of the West Florida government. Skipwith and the legislature reluctantly agreed to accept Madison's proclamation, believing it not sufficiently respectful of the elected government.

== Later life ==
Skipwith was elected to serve in the Louisiana State Senate where he served as that body's second President. In December 1814, during the War of 1812, Magloire Guichard and Skipwith sponsored a legislative resolution to grant amnesty to "the privateers lately resorting to Barataria, who might be deterred from offering their services for fear of prosecution." This led to Jean Lafitte and his men joining in the defense of New Orleans during the Battle of New Orleans, when the city was attacked by British forces.

In 1827, Skipwith, Armand Duplantier, Antoine Blanc, Thomas B. Robertson, and Sebastien Hiriart received permission from the Louisiana State Legislature to organize a corporation called the Agricultural Society of Baton Rouge. The purpose of the society was as follows: "The sole and special objects of the said society shall be the improvement of agriculture, the amelioration of the breed of horses, of horned cattle, and others, and in all of the several branches relative to agriculture in a country."

Skipwith died at his plantation, Montesano, near Baton Rouge, on January 7, 1839, at age 73.
