= Armand Duplantier =

French cavalry officer

Armand Gabriel Allard du Plantier (1753 – 9 Oct 1827) was a French cavalry officer who served in the American Revolutionary War as an aide-de-camp to General Lafayette.

== Early life ==
Armand was born in Voiron, France, the son of Joseph Antoine Guy Allard du Plantier (1721–1801) and Gabrielle Trenonay de Chanfrey.

== Move to America ==
In 1781, he moved to Louisiana (New Spain), settling on the plantation of his uncle, Claude Trénonay, in the area of Pointe Coupée on the Mississippi River. He married his uncle's stepdaughter, Marie Augustine Gerard; the couple had six children, four of whom survived to adulthood. Marie Augustine died of yellow fever in 1799. In 1802 Duplantier remarried, to widow Constance Rochon Joyce, and the couple resided part of the time in their country house at Mount Magnolia plantation (which property today is within the city of Baton Rouge and owned by that city). Five more children were born of this union.

Duplantier was disturbed by the slave revolt which occurred locally in 1794 or 1795. It was called the Pointe Coupée Conspiracy and reminded him of the Haitian Revolution (1791–1804). He was a slave-owner and regretted that he had bought some Saint-Domingue slaves, but he did not want to sell them until they regained their value.

== Later life ==
Armand Duplantier helped to establish a college in Baton Rouge in 1822. A few years later, he was part of the delegation which welcomed the Marquis de Lafayette, during his American tour.

In 1827, Duplantier, Fulwar Skipwith, Antoine Blanc, Thomas B. Robertson, and Sebastien Hiriart received permission from the Louisiana State Legislature to organize a corporation called the Agricultural Society of Baton Rouge. Armand Duplantier died the same year and was given military honors at his funeral, in tribute to his Revolutionary War service.

== See also ==
- Mount Magnolia plantation, in East Baton Rouge Parish
- Washington Artillery, descendant Armand Joseph Duplantier Jr. (1919-1985), served for a time as Commander of the Washington Artillery.
