= Philemon Thomas =

American politician

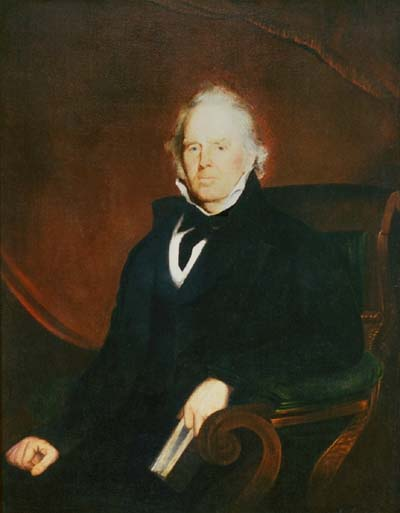
- Portrait by George P. A. Healy, 1845.

Member of the U.S. House of Representatives from Louisiana's 2nd district
- In office March 4, 1831 – March 3, 1835
- Preceded by: Henry Hosford Gurley
- Succeeded by: Eleazer Wheelock Ripley

Member of the Kentucky Senate
- In office 1800–1803

Member of the Kentucky House of Representatives
- In office 1769–1799

Personal details
- Born: February 9, 1763 Orange County, Virginia
- Died: November 18, 1847 (aged 84) Baton Rouge, Louisiana
- Party: Democratic
- Spouse(s): (1) Mary Craig (2) Fanny Hawkins
- Children: 3

Military service
- Allegiance: United States
- Branch/service: Continental Army; Louisiana Militia
- Years of service: 1778-1815
- Rank: Major General
- Battles/wars: American Revolutionary War; Northwest Indian War; War of 1812

Philemon Thomas (February 9, 1763 – November 18, 1847) was an American politician and soldier who served as the U.S. representative from Louisiana's 2nd congressional district from 1831 to 1835. He previously served in the Kentucky state legislature and was a member of the Kentucky Constitutional Convention.

Achieving the rank of major general, he was a military veteran of the American Revolutionary War, the Northwest Indian War, the War of 1812, and commanded the militia forces in the West Florida Revolt.

== Biography ==
Philemon Thomas was born in Orange County, Virginia Colony, on February 9, 1763, to Richard Thomas II and Frances Hawkins. He was educated in common schools and when he was sixteen, enlisted as a private in the 6th North Carolina Regiment during the Revolutionary War. He served under the command of General Nathanael Greene, was promoted to the rank of ensign, and saw action at the Battle of Guilford Court House.

After the end of the war, Thomas settled in the Kentucky District of Virginia around 1783. He volunteered for military service again after the outbreak of the Northwest Indian War. He fought in the Battle of the Wabash where he suggested opening a passage through the enemies' lines, a move that saved part of the men under the command of General Arthur St. Clair. After Kentucky was admitted as a state, Thomas served as a member of Kentucky's Constitutional Convention in 1799. He served in the state House and state Senate. He also ran for Congress four times while in Kentucky: in the 2nd ("Northern") congressional district in 1799 and 1801, and in the 6th congressional district in 1803 and 1804.

=== Move to Louisiana ===
In 1806 he moved to Spanish West Florida where he engaged in land speculating and established a grocery business in Baton Rouge. On August 22, 1810, he attended a convention where elected officials debated on overthrowing the Spanish authority in the region. All but one delegate voted in favor of the resolution and Thomas was appointed as commander of the militia force by the convention with the rank of Colonel Commandant. Colonel Thomas recruited volunteers and moved take the Fort San Carlos in Baton Rouge before it could be reinforced. At the time the fort contained only twenty-eight men, including two officers, Lieutenants Luis de Grand Pre and J. B. Metzinger. At midnight, September 22, Thomas ordered his militia force to approach the fort and demand its surrender. When they were fired upon, they returned fire and in the ensuing battle, the militia force was able to take the fort and capture twenty-one prisoners, including Don Carlos de Hault de Lassus, Spanish governor of Baton Rouge.

Shortly after, the convention declared the independence of West Florida from Spain, officially changed Thomas' rank to General, and dispatched him to quell loyalist militias in the region. He secured the surrender of loyalist in Springfield and St. Helena Parish after which John Rhea, President of the convention, requested that President James Madison annex the Republic of West Florida.

According to Southeastern Louisiana University history professor Sam Hyde,

Residents of the western Florida Parishes proved largely supportive of the revolt, . . . while the majority of the population in the eastern region of the Florida Parishes opposed the insurrection. Thomas’ army violently suppressed opponents of the revolt, leaving a bitter legacy in the Tangipahoa and Tchefuncte River regions.

On November 10, 1810, Philemon Thomas was elected to the newly established senate. He was made commander of the army and was authorized by the executive committee to assemble a force of over 600 militia to be commanded by Reuben Kemper for an aborted planned campaign to take both Mobile and Pensacola. President Madison instructed William C. C. Claiborne, governor of the Territory of Orleans, to take possession of the area which was incorporated as the County of Feleciana as part of the Louisiana Purchase. Claiborne spoke with Thomas and referred to him as “the Ajax of the late revolution, who [has] always been [an] esteemed and honest man.”

Thomas continued his military career in the Louisiana Militia until 1815, serving as a Major General in the War of 1812. He was elected as representative of Louisiana's 2nd congressional district where he served two terms in Congress. In 1820, he was a member of the Electoral College, voting for James Monroe. He ran for Governor twice, in 1824 and in 1828. He died in Baton Rouge, Louisiana, and is interred there in the Baton Rouge National Cemetery.

== Notes ==
U.S. House of Representatives
Preceded by Henry Hosford Gurley	Member of the U.S. House of Representatives from Louisiana's 2nd congressional district 1831–1835	Succeeded by Eleazer Wheelock Ripley
