= Île d'Orléans, Louisiana =

Place in the United States

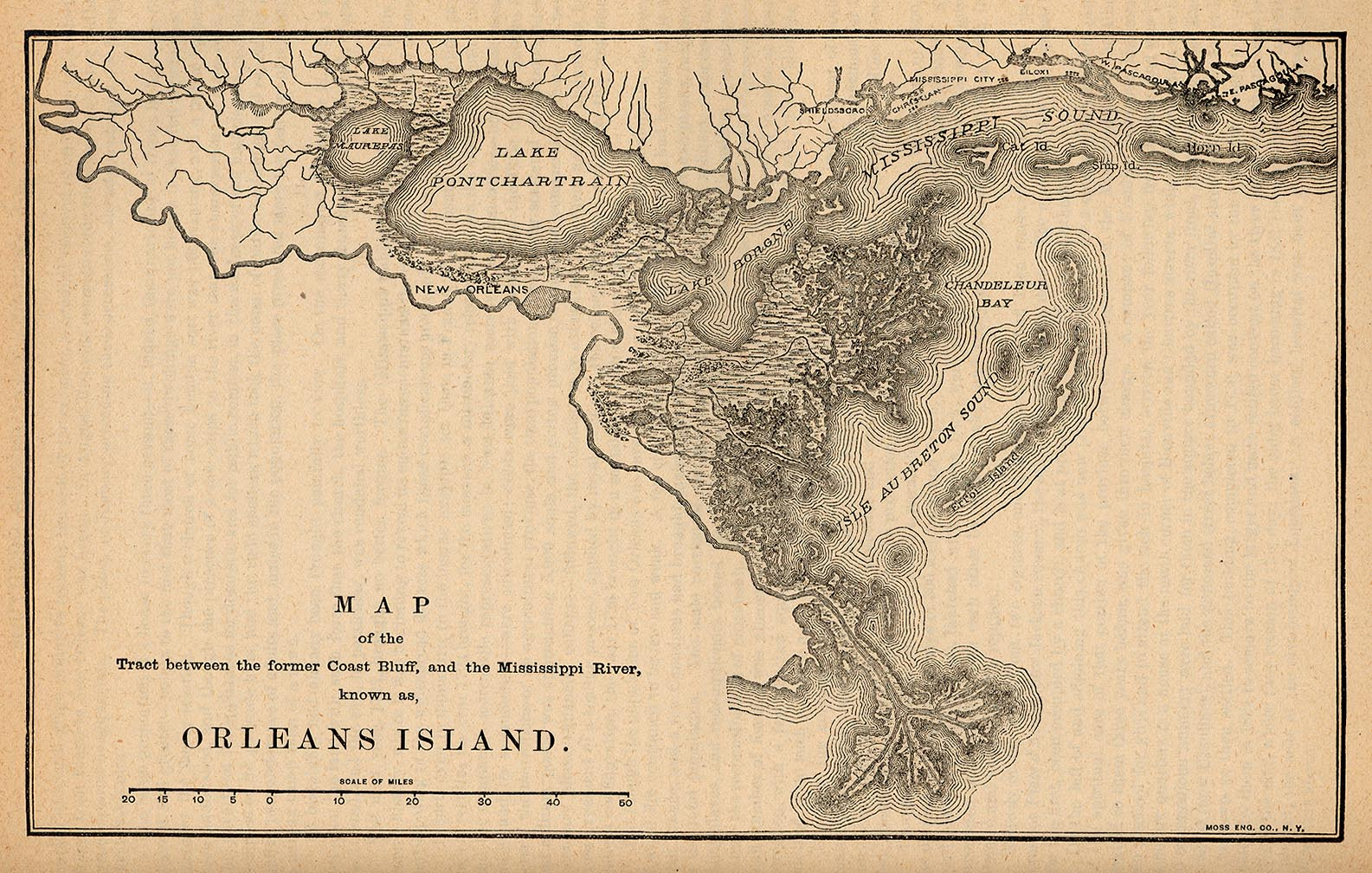
1880 map of the Isle of Orleans

Île d'Orléans (French for "Isle of Orleans") was the historic name for the New Orleans area, which was part of Louisiana, New France, in present-day Louisiana state, United States.

== History ==
In 1762, France, anticipating that Great Britain would take Louisiana at the end of the French and Indian War, in the Treaty of Fontainebleau transferred to Spain all of Louisiana west of the Mississippi River, as well as a newly defined area east of the Mississippi which included New Orleans, called the Isle of Orleans.

As the French had expected, in the Treaty of Paris (1763) the British took all of Louisiana east of the Mississippi, except for the Isle of Orleans, and incorporated it into their colony of West Florida, with the capital at Pensacola, and further to the north into their new British Province of Quebec. Spanish possession of Louisiana west of the Mississippi River, and of the Isle of Orleans, was also confirmed in the Treaty of Paris. (Pugliese 2002)

The Isle of Orleans was bounded by the Mississippi River, the Gulf of Mexico, Lakes Pontchartrain and Maurepas, the Amite River, and Bayou Manchac, previously known as Iberville River.

The Isle of Orleans was included in the 1803 Louisiana Purchase. It formed the southern border of the short-lived Republic of West Florida, a few years later.
