= Thomas B. Robertson =

United States federal judge (1779–1828)

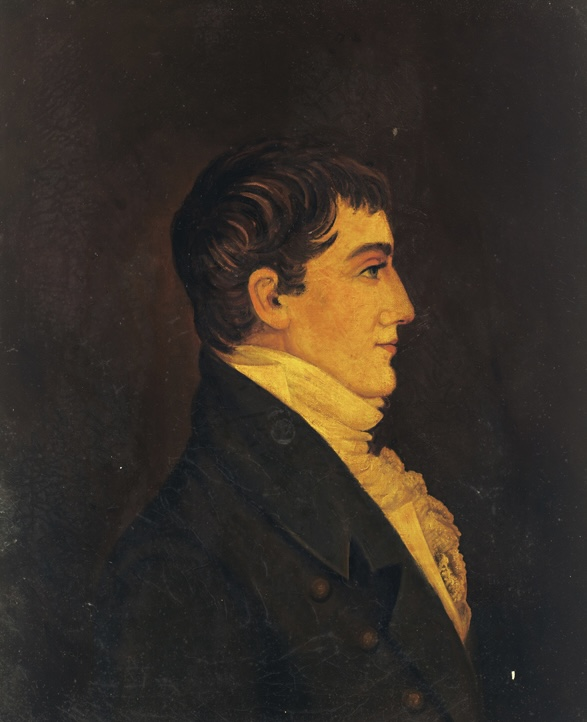
- Portrait by Joseph B. Treble Jr.

Judge of the United States District Court for the Eastern District of Louisiana Judge of the United States District Court for the Western District of Louisiana
- In office May 26, 1824 – October 5, 1828
- Appointed by: James Monroe
- Preceded by: John Dick
- Succeeded by: Samuel Hadden Harper

3rd Governor of Louisiana
- In office December 18, 1820 – November 15, 1824
- Preceded by: Jacques Villeré
- Succeeded by: Henry S. Thibodaux

Attorney General of Louisiana
- In office 1819–1821
- Governor: Jacques Villeré
- Preceded by: Louis Moreau-Lislet
- Succeeded by: Etienne Mazureau

Member of the U.S. House of Representatives from Louisiana's at-large district
- In office April 30, 1812 – April 20, 1818
- Preceded by: Office established
- Succeeded by: Thomas Butler

Personal details
- Born: Thomas Bolling Robertson; February 27, 1779 Petersburg, Virginia
- Died: October 5, 1828 (aged 49) White Sulphur Springs, Virginia, US
- Resting place: Copeland Hill Cemetery; White Sulphur Springs, West Virginia, US
- Party: Democratic-Republican
- Relations: Fulwar Skipwith
- Relatives: John Robertson; Wyndham Robertson
- Education: College of William & Mary read law

Thomas Bolling Robertson (February 27, 1779 – October 5, 1828) was an American politician who served as Attorney General of the Orleans Territory, Secretary of the Louisiana Territory, a United States representative from Louisiana, the 3rd Governor of Louisiana, Attorney General of Louisiana and a United States district judge of the United States District Court for the Eastern District of Louisiana and the United States District Court for the Western District of Louisiana.

== Education and career ==
Born on February 27, 1779, at Bellefield near Petersburg, Virginia, Robertson attended the College of William & Mary and read law in 1806. He was admitted to the bar and entered private practice in Petersburg in 1806. He was Attorney General of the Orleans Territory from 1806 to 1807. He was Secretary of the Louisiana Territory from 1807 to 1811.

== Congressional service ==
Upon the admission of the Territory into the Union as the State of Louisiana, Robertson was elected as a Democratic-Republican from Louisiana's at-large congressional district to the United States House of Representatives of the 12th United States Congress and to the three succeeding Congresses and served from April 30, 1812, to April 20, 1818, when he resigned. He was chairman of the Committee on Public Lands for the 14th and 15th United States Congresses.

== Later career ==
Following his departure from Congress, Robertson resumed private practice in Louisiana from 1818 to 1820. He was the 3rd Governor of Louisiana from December 18, 1820, until his resignation on November 15, 1824. He was Attorney General of Louisiana in 1822.

== Federal judicial service ==
Robertson was nominated by President James Monroe on May 24, 1824, to a joint seat on the United States District Court for the Eastern District of Louisiana and the United States District Court for the Western District of Louisiana vacated by Judge John Dick. He was confirmed by the United States Senate on May 26, 1824, and received his commission the same day. His service terminated on October 5, 1828, due to his death in White Sulphur Springs, Virginia (now West Virginia). He was interred in Copeland Hill Cemetery in White Sulphur Springs.

== Membership ==
Robertson was elected a member of the American Antiquarian Society in 1821.

== Agricultural society ==
In 1827, Robertson, along with Armand Duplantier, father-in-law Fulwar Skipwith, Antoine Blanc and Sebastien Hiriart received permission from the Louisiana State Legislature to organize a corporation called the Agricultural Society of Baton Rouge.

== Family ==
Robertson had two brothers with political legacies: United States Representative John Robertson and Wyndham Robertson, a Governor of Virginia. He married Lelia Skipwith, daughter of Fulwar Skipwith

== Honor ==
Robertson Street in New Orleans is named for the former Governor.

== Sources ==
- United States Congress. "Thomas B. Robertson (id: R000326)". Biographical Directory of the United States Congress.
- Thomas Bolling Robertson at the Biographical Directory of Federal Judges, a publication of the Federal Judicial Center.

U.S. House of Representatives
Preceded by Office established	Member of the U.S. House of Representatives from Louisiana's at-large congressional district 1812–1818	Succeeded by Thomas Butler
Legal offices
Preceded by Louis Moreau de Liset	Attorney General of Louisiana; 1822	Succeeded by Etienne Mazureau
Preceded by John Dick	Judge of the United States District Court for the Eastern District of Louisiana; Judge of the United States District Court for the Western District of Louisiana; 1824–1828	Succeeded by Samuel Hadden Harper
Political offices
Preceded by Jacques Villeré	3rd Governor of Louisiana; 1820–1822	Succeeded by Henry S. Thibodaux
