= Rapides County, Territory of Orleans =

Administrative subdivision, 1805–1807

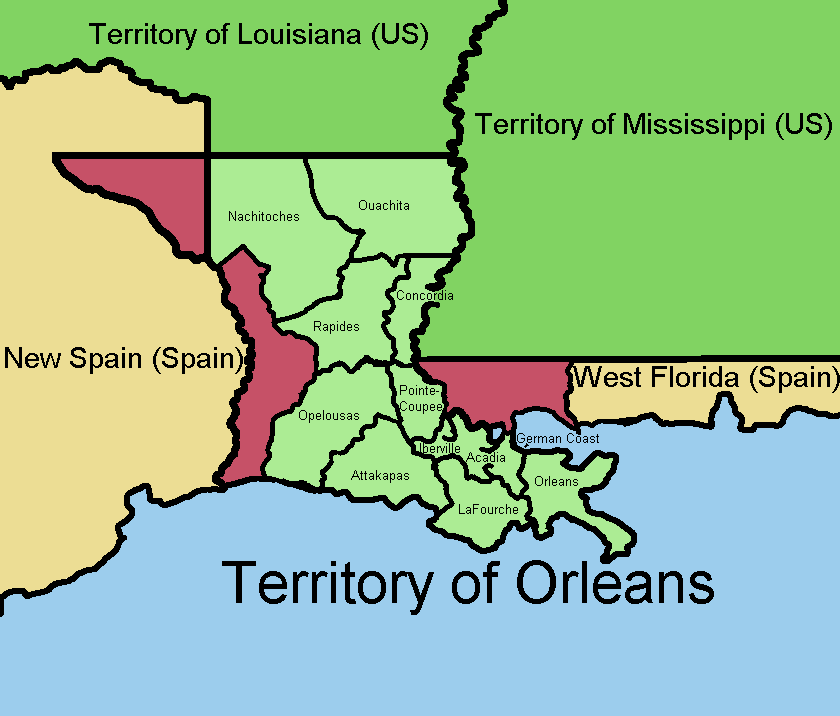
Map of Orleans Territory in 1804; Rapides in the center

Rapides County was one of the original 12 subdivisions of the Territory of Orleans, United States. It was extant from 1805 to 1807, and encompassed all of the land between the Black and Tensas Rivers on the east to the Sabine River on the west, bounded by Opelousas County on the south, and Natchitoches County and Ouachita County on the north. The official language in the law was "The County of Rapides shall comprehend the settlement of Rapides, Avoyelles, Catahoula, Bayou Boeuf, Bayou Robert and all other settlements which now are or may be made in the vicinity thereof and which may in the opinion of the Superior Court, lie nearer or more conveniently to the house or seat of the Justice of the said County of Rapides than the Courthouse or seat of Justice of any other county."

Rapides Parish was one of 19 parishes organized in 1807, encompassing "Catahoula to the Sabine and from Natchitoches to somewhere in the present Avoyelles district. Of the 64 parishes currently extant in Louisiana, eight were formed wholly or in part from Rapides County: Avoyelles Parish, Catahoula Parish, LaSalle Parish, Rapides Parish (whole), and Caldwell Parish, Franklin Parish, Grant Parish, Winn Parish, and Vernon Parish (parts). County law enforcement posts were merged into a parish judge position in 1807.
