= Jacques Villeré =

American politician (1761–1830)

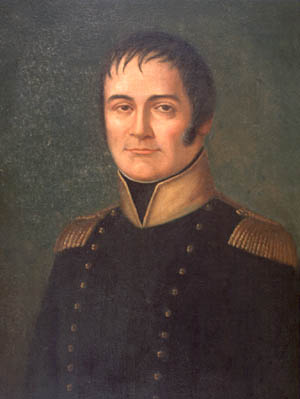

2nd Governor of Louisiana
- In office December 16, 1816 – December 18, 1820
- Preceded by: William C. C. Claiborne
- Succeeded by: Thomas B. Robertson

Personal details
- Born: April 28, 1761 Les Tchapitoulas, Colony of Louisiana
- Died: March 7, 1830 (aged 68) St. Bernard Parish, Louisiana
- Resting place: Saint Louis Cemetery No. 2, New Orleans, Louisiana
- Party: Democratic-Republican
- Spouse: Jeanne Henriette de Fazende
- Children: 8

Military service
- Allegiance: Kingdom of France; United States
- Branch/service: French Army; Louisiana State Militia
- Rank: Lieutenant (French Army); Major General (Militia)
- Battles/wars: War of 1812; Battle of New Orleans

Jacques Philippe Villeré (April 28, 1761 – March 7, 1830) was a Louisiana Creole politician who was elected and served as the second Governor of Louisiana after it became a state. He was the first native-born Louisianian to govern the state.

== Early life ==
Jacques Philippe Villeré was born on April 26, 1761, to Louise Marguerite de la Chaise and Joseph Antoine de Villeré on his maternal grandfather's plantation La Providence in present day Kenner in French Louisiana.

His father was an officer in the French Navy and later served as a militia captain in the German Coast area the Louisiana Colony. Here he met and later married Louise Marguerite de la Chaise, daughter of Jacques de la Chaise and granddaughter, on her mother's side, of Charles Frederick d’Arensbourg, the founder of the German Coast. A few years after 1763's cession of Louisiana to Spain, Joseph was sentenced to death by Governor Alejandro O'Reilly for participating in the Creole Revolt against the Spanish authority. He mysteriously died prior to the firing squad execution of the rebels, in October 1769.

After his father's death, Villeré was sent to France where he served as a page in the court of King Louis XVI. He spent several years being educated and was commissioned as an artillery officer in the French Army. He was deployed to Saint-Domingue with the rank of lieutenant but resigned his commission and returned to his family home in 1782 after receiving news of his mother's death.

In 1784, Villeré married Jeanne Henriette de Fazende, the daughter of Gabriel de Fazende, who owned a plantation seven miles (11 km) below New Orleans in present-day Saint Bernard Parish. The couple raised eight children.

== Career ==
Villeré and his family settled at his sugar plantation, Conseil, located in present day Meraux. He joined the Louisiana Militia as a Colonel and was later promoted to Major General and commanded the 1st Division of the militia during the Battle of New Orleans. His son Major René-Gabriell was tasked with guarding the home, but it was taken over by British forces who used it as a headquarters. René-Gabriell escaped captured and reported the news to General Andrew Jackson who ordered the night attack of December 23, 1814. Villeré and his division were assigned to the area near Lake Borgne and Bayou Dupre, as British forces approached New Orleans by sea.

=== Political career ===
Villeré began his career in politics when he joined the staff of Governor Pierre-Clément de Laussat after Louisiana was briefly returned to French rule in 1803. After the Louisiana Purchase he served as a member of the first state constitutional convention in 1811 and ran in the state's first gubernatorial election in 1812 but lost to William C. C. Claiborne. He ran again in the 1816 election against Virginian judge Joshua Lewis and won by a slim majority.

He took office in December of that year and served through 1820, a period of prosperity and growth for the new state. His administration was noted for efforts to provide bankruptcy protection for debtors, reduce state debt, and to outlaw the practice of dueling by enforcing the death penalty for the winner of a duel if it could be proved that he instigated it. In 1819 he pushed for a measure providing annual appropriations for each parish to establish public schools, a position he credited Thomas Jefferson for inspiring. He also sought to amend tension between the Creole and Anglo-American population of the state by mandating all legal documents, laws, and official government records recorded in both French and English.

He retired to the family's sugar plantation in St. Bernard Parish after his term, as the law did not permit him to succeed himself in office. Villeré was brought out of retirement to run again for governor in the 1824 election, but he and Bernard de Marigny split the Creole vote and Henry Johnson was elected governor.

He was preparing to run for Governor again in the 1830 special election; but he died March 7, 1830, before the election, at the plantation Conseil after a long illness. His remains were interred at St. Louis Cemetery No. 2, in New Orleans.

== See also ==
- Charles Jacques Villeré

Political offices
Preceded by William C. C. Claiborne	Governor of Louisiana; 1816–1820	Succeeded by Thomas B. Robertson
