= 1812 election =

1812 election may refer to:

- Louisiana gubernatorial election, 1812
- 1812 United Kingdom general election
- 1812 United States presidential election
- United States House of Representatives elections, 1812 and 1813
