= 1816 Louisiana gubernatorial election =

- July 3, 1816
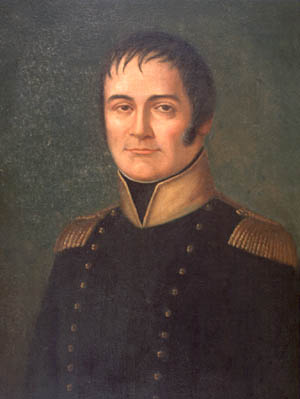

Nominee	Jacques Villeré	Joshua Lewis
Party	Democratic-Republican	Democratic-Republican
Electoral vote	43	3
Popular vote	2,309	2,134
Percentage	51.78%	47.86%
- Parish Results; Villeré: 50–60% 60–70% 70–80% 80–90% 90–100% Lewis: 60–70% 70–80% 80–90% 90–100% No Data
Governor before election
William C. C. Claiborne
Democratic-Republican
Elected Governor
Jacques Villeré
Democratic-Republican

The 1816 Louisiana gubernatorial election was the second gubernatorial election to take place after Louisiana achieved statehood. Under Article III Sec 2 of the 1812 Constitution of the State of Louisiana the Governor was elected in two steps. On the first Monday in July, eligible voters went to the polls and voted. The returns were sent to the President of the Louisiana State Senate. On the second day of the session of the Louisiana State Legislature, the Louisiana House of Representatives and Senate met in joint session and voted between the top two candidates. The candidate who received a majority in General Assembly became governor.

== General election ==
=== Candidates ===
- Joshua Lewis, judge of the 1st Judicial District Court
- Jacques Villeré, former first lieutenant in the French Army

Popular Vote

Candidate	Votes received	Percentage
Jacques Villeré	2,309	51.78%
Joshua Lewis	2,134	47.86%
Total Vote	4,459	

General Assembly Vote

Candidate	Votes received	Percentage
Jacques Villeré	43	93.48%
Joshua Lewis	3	6.52%
Total Vote	46	

Preceded by 1812 Louisiana gubernatorial election	Louisiana gubernatorial elections	Succeeded by 1820 Louisiana gubernatorial election
