= Simon Favre =

Muskogean language interpreter

- Born: May 31, 1760; Mobile District, French Louisiana
- Died: July 3, 1813 (aged 53); Mobile, West Florida
- Education: Proficient linguist and letter writer
- Known for: Choctaw interpreter for French, British, Spanish and Americans
- Spouse: Celeste Rochon (m. 1801)
- Partner(s): Pistikiokonay (Choctaw mistress); Rebecca Austin (Brazilian mistress)
- Children: With Pistikiokonay: Alexis; Katherine; Louis; Charles; Mary; Jean Baptiste; With Rebecca Austin: Simon With Celeste Rochon: Jean; Augustine; Onezan; Louisa; Marguerite; Carlota
- Parent(s): Jean Claude Favre and Marguerite Wiltz
- Relatives: Ancestor of Brett Favre

Simon Favre (May 31, 1760 – July 3, 1813) was an interpreter of the Muskogean languages, particularly Choctaw and Chickasaw, for the French, British, Spanish and Americans in the part of West Florida that became part of the states of Mississippi and Alabama. The son of another prominent interpreter, Favre spent the late 18th century in the vicinity of Mobile and the Tombigbee River, which changed hands from French to British, and then Spanish control. He became well versed in the language and culture of the Choctaws, and was involved with several treaties between the Europeans and natives. As a young man he had a Choctaw mistress with whom he had six known children, then at the age of 41 he was legally married in Mobile to a woman of European descent. Within a few years of his marriage, he moved with his new family from the Tombigbee area to a plantation on the Pearl River.

As the power of the Choctaws diminished, Favre became less important as an interpreter, and more important as a facilitator of the political changes occurring along the Gulf Coast. Once the Louisiana Purchase was concluded between France and the United States, American settlers from both inside and outside Spanish West Florida increased pressure on Spain for American control of the territory. While the transfer did not officially take place until 1821, the Spanish essentially put Florida under the trust of the United States in 1810, and Favre played a major role in facilitating the transfer, and keeping the Indians informed of the events. Favre was considered the top interpreter in the region by men of prominence, including Governor William C. C. Claiborne of Louisiana who made Favre a justice of the peace, and recommended him for the position of United States agent to the Choctaws. A "talk" that Favre gave to the Choctaws on the eve of the War of 1812 was touted by historian Russell Guerin as a masterpiece of diplomacy, and displayed Favre's deep understanding of the native language and culture.

Favre died in 1813, leaving many minor children and a substantial estate of more than 5,000 acres (2,000 ha) of land and 57 slaves. He had thirteen known children with three different women, and leaves numerous descendants. A well-known descendant is former National Football League quarterback Brett Favre. Simon Favre's associations with property owners and prominent officials demonstrate that he was a person of very high social standing.

== Life ==
=== Ancestry ===
Born near Mobile, then a part of French Louisiana, on May 31, 1760, Simon Favre was the son of Jean Claude Favre (1721–1782) and Marguerite Wiltz (1740–1805). His grandfather, Jean Baptiste Favre, came from Royan, France, and by tradition was a cabin boy when Pierre D'Iberville placed him on shore near Biloxi to make contact with the natives. His father was a government interpreter who was commissioned to explain the terms of the Treaty of Paris to the natives upon the conclusion of the French and Indian War. Favre's mother was the daughter of a Swiss soldier.

=== Early life ===
Learning from his father, Favre became fluent in the languages of French, English, Spanish, and the Muskogean languages including Choctaw and Chickasaw. The lands along the Gulf coast were held by the British for nearly two decades following the 1763 Treaty of Paris, but their ability to maintain control diminished during that time. On September 3, 1783, the British ceded their lands in both East and West Florida to Spain under the Treaty of Versailles. Favre's father had just died the year before this treaty, and Simon Favre followed his father's career, also inheriting his father's plantation on the Pearl River, though continuing to reside in Mobile near his mother.

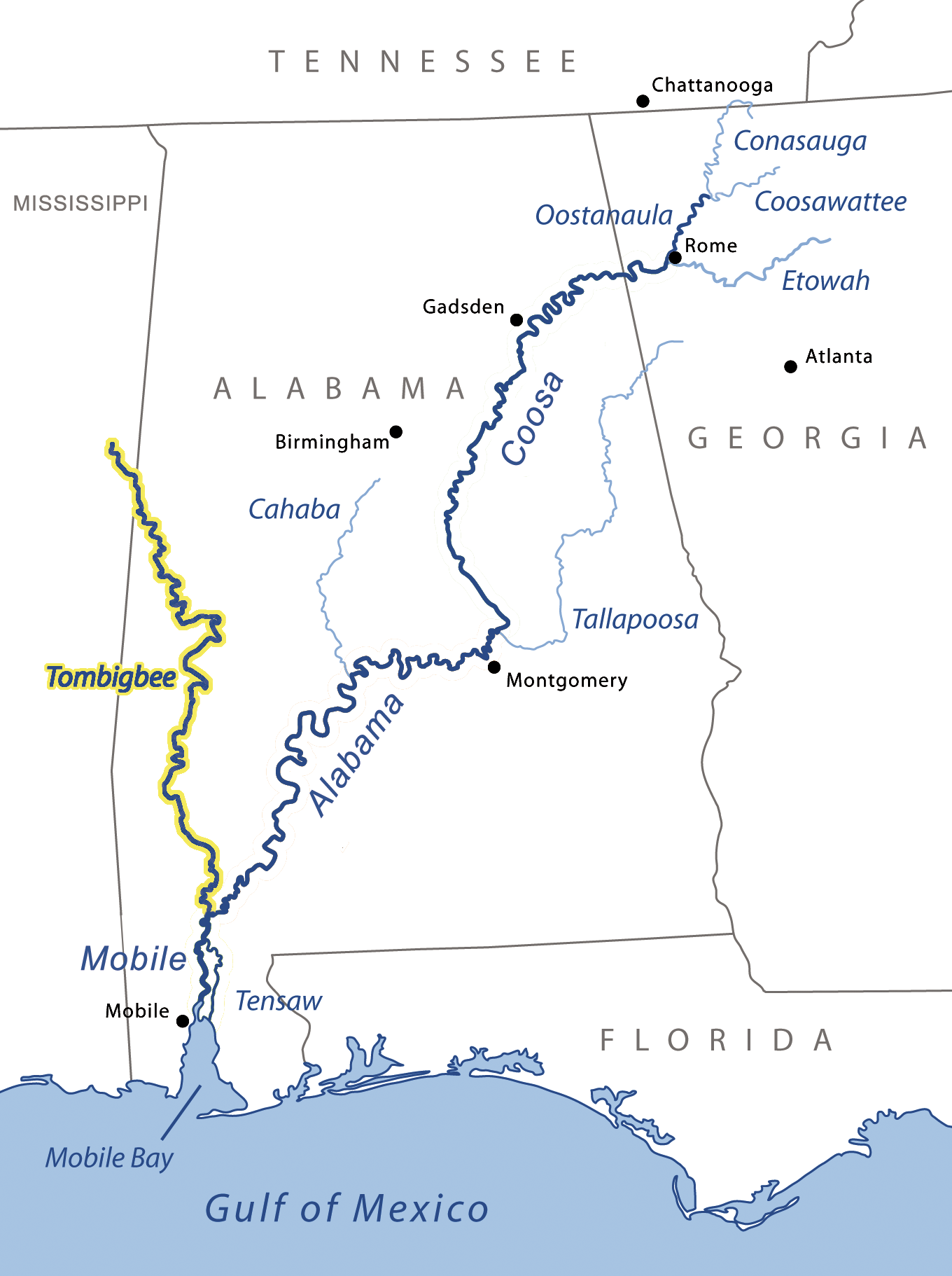
Much of Favre's early career was spent with the Choctaws near the Tombigbee River

Favre spent his early adult years among the natives along the Tombigbee River, being initially employed by the French as an interpreter of the Choctaw language, but soon coming into the employ of the British and later the Spanish. Favre also understood the Chickasaw language, but at one point his translation was challenged by James Colbert (grandfather of Holmes Colbert), who had married into the Chickasaw tribe, replaced Favre as interpreter. which was not a problem earlier for Spain during the Treaty of Natchez in 1793, nor at any other time in the long history of his duties for France. Favre was said to be a confidant and personal friend of the celebrated Choctaw Indian chief Pushmataha. Genealogist Heitzmann relates that at one point Favre acted as the interpreter between Pushmataha and the military commanders Andrew Jackson and General Thomas Hinds.

In 1792 Juan De la Villebeuvre, who worked among the Indians on behalf of the Spanish government, was named a special commissioner to the Choctaws and Chickasaws. Favre's reputation as a competent and valuable interpreter grew quickly, and in an undated letter to Governor Baron Francisco Carondelet, De la Villebeuvre wrote, "...I am going to reside with Favre, who is employed by the king [of Spain] and who will serve me as interpreter. He is the best one of the province, with a great influence over the minds of the Indians, and he knows how to lead them firmly whenever necessary." Favre built a house for De la Villebeuvre about twelve miles (19 km) from the village of the Eastern Division Choctaw Chief Franchimastvbe' with whom Favre had become friendly.

Favre was present at Fort Natchez, located in Choctaw territory near the mouth of the Yazoo River, when the Treaty of Natchez was signed on October 28, 1793; a treaty between Spain (and signed by the king) and the Alibamon, Cherokee, Chickasaw, Choctaw, Creek and Tallapoosa nations. Representing the Eastern Div. Choctaws were chiefs Franchimastvbe' and 6 Towns Chief Pushmataha (later MS Choctaw Nation Chief), while Favre signed as a witness. In January 1794 Favre wrote a letter to Don Manuel Lanzos, Spanish commander at Natchez, warning of a great rumor among the Choctaws that the Americans were coming to destroy them. The Choctaws were in difficult straits at the time, from both the consumption of alcohol and from a corn crop failure brought on by an earlier drought. They were stealing horses from other tribes as well as from the Europeans, and Favre himself had three horses stolen while staying near the Tombigbee. De la Villebeuvre felt that these actions were being instigated by the Americans, and Favre was sent to the Choctaw villages to assess the feelings of the natives.

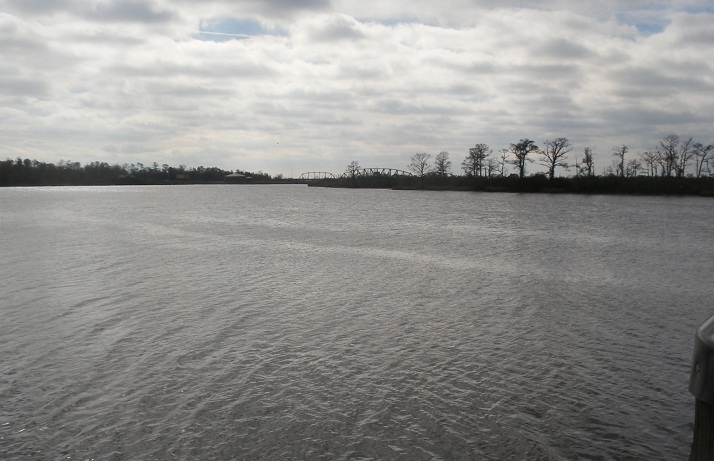
Pearl River from Favre's former plantation, now Pearlington, Mississippi

Following the Treaty of Boukfouka on May 10, 1793, the Spaniards built a fort on the location where the French had earlier built Fort Tombecbe, and named it Confederacion in honor of the alliance between the Spanish and Indians. In the late 1700s, Favre was living near Fort Confederation, but sometime after 1797 moved to St. Stephens. He moved into a house across the road from Augustin Rochon, his future father-in-law. After spending time there and at various other locations along the Tombigbee, Favre returned to Mobile before 1800 where he occupied a house on Loyal Street. While there, he associated with other interpreters including J. B. Roussere and Simon Andry. Favre also maintained very close ties with New Orleans and he called himself of that city in the 1800 baptismal record for his son Simon.

=== Pearl River ===
After having seven children with two other women, Favre was legally married in Mobile in 1801 to Celeste Rochon. Sometime between 1804 and 1806, following the birth of two children in Mobile, he moved with his new family to one of his plantations on the Pearl River, near what became Pearlington, Mississippi. This was shortly following the Louisiana Purchase of 1803, when the Americans were showing a great interest in West Florida, still governed by Spain. Favre then became an important interpreter in the service of the Americans, as well as continuing to work for the Spanish who were eventually compelled to give up control of their Florida lands.

While Favre's importance had initially sprung from his influence with the native tribes, particularly the Choctaws, as the power of these people declined he became much more important as an intermediary during the turbulent times of transition from Spanish to American rule in West Florida. During this period early in the 19th century, the Spanish authorities were losing their hold on West Florida for a variety of reasons. One such reason was piracy, while another was American encroachment following the Louisiana Purchase. Many Americans felt that West Florida should have been included in the purchase. One means used by Spain to attempt to hold on to this region was to commission several important settlers to work for their government. In this regard, Favre was assigned to confirm land deeds that the Spanish were doling out at an accelerated rate, to attempt to stem the tide of American encroachment. Favre also provided intelligence and military maps to the Spanish concerning the activities of not only the Americans, who were applying pressure from outside the jurisdiction, but also rebels along the Pearl River and nearby coast. The rebels, led by Reuben Kemper and his brothers, were causing difficulties from within, and had been attempting to pull West Florida from Spanish control for several years. Under the Spanish, Favre became known as the commander of the District of Bay St. Louis. Many of the land titles that were awarded by Favre were later reviewed by the United States government and appear in the collection of American state papers.

With Americans in control of New Orleans, mail from Fort Stoddard, near Mobile, had to pass through Spanish territory to get there. In 1808 the United States Postmaster wrote to the Secretary of the Treasury that Favre, who was still a Spanish subject, served as an agent for the post office, forwarding the mail passing through Spanish lands.

Though West Florida was not officially ceded to the United States until 1819 under the provisions of the Adams–Onis Treaty, in November 1810 Spanish governor Folach, demanding secrecy, essentially delivered both East and West Florida to the United States in trust. This was done in hopes that the "robberies and depredations" upon the citizens would cease, and under the realization that the transfer was inevitable. Soon thereafter American officials began managing the Florida lands, setting up administrative regions within them, and the western part of West Florida (the part in present-day Louisiana) was absorbed into the United States under the proclamation of President James Madison. When Louisiana became a state in 1812, the remainder of West Florida (the panhandles of Mississippi and Alabama) was absorbed by the United States. The western part of this newly annexed Mobile District was organized into Hancock and Harrison Counties (soon a part of the Mississippi Territory), and in 1813 American federal troops were stationed there to formalize the transition.

=== Late career and death ===
"Brothers! I salute you in friendship, & beg you to open your Ears, that you may hear my words,- Many of you remember me, when I was a Chief at Natchez, & know that I never deceived you. My friendly disposition towards you remains unaltered, & since I have been a Chief at New Orleans, I have always been just to the red men.-

Brothers! When I have a journey to make, I take the nearest path, turning neither to the right nor to the left, but keeping straight on So it is when I send out a talk my manner is to speak plain, & to ease my heart at once, of what I have to say.-

Brothers! The English who live beyond the big Water have done the Americans much harm;- they have robbed us of our property- compelled many of our people to serve on board of their Ships of War, & spilt American blood.- The President of the U: States, & his head Men have determined upon satisfaction; the Tomahawk is raised & our hearts are cross.- This a quarrel Brothers between white people, & does not concern the red Men...

...But Brothers I must conclude- Many words are soon forgotten. Take Simon Favre by the hand, & whatever he tells you in my name, believe him, for he is a good Man, & will neither betray me, nor deceive you. I have nothing more to say Brothers- but to express a wish, that the Tomahawk between the Americans & the Choctaws may long remain buried.–"

— Excerpts from letter of Governor W. C. C. Claiborne to the Choctaws, August 1812, prepared and delivered by Simon Favre

Just as his father had made the transition from French to British rule, Favre likewise had little difficulty changing his allegiance from the Spanish to the Americans, and he continued to hold a prominent position in the region. In January 1811 Favre was chosen by the Orleans territorial governor William C. C. Claiborne as a magistrate of the "Parish of Biloxi" which was within the territory. When Claiborne became the Louisiana governor following statehood in 1812, he commissioned Favre as a justice of the peace, and clearly admired him, calling him in a letter an educated and very agreeable man who would make an energetic officer.

At the outset of the War of 1812, the Americans were interested in assessing the alignment of the native tribes in regards to their loyalty to Britain. In August 1812 Claiborne sent Favre to present a talk to the native tribes of West Florida. Favre's carefully crafted words, presented under Claiborne's name, provide an example of the diplomatic skill with which Favre was able to address the language and culture of the Muskogean tribes. While the goal of Favre and the governor was to keep the Choctaws and other tribes out of the "white man's war", ultimately the Creeks aligned themselves with the British, and the Americans requested assistance from the Choctaws. In a letter to Secretary of War John Armstrong, Claiborne recommended that "Colonel Simon Favre" become a United States agent for the Choctaws. Favre held the rank of Lieutenant Colonel in the Hancock County militia, and early in the War of 1812 he was able to negotiate with the Choctaws to provide assistance against Britain's Creek allies.

Favre died in the summer of 1813, and though he was living along the Pearl River, court testimony by Peter Moran in 1845 stated that he died in Mobile, and had not been there long before his death. A letter by Mississippi governor David Holmes, dated August 1, 1813, mentions the "absence of Colonel Favre at Mobile" and "his subsequent death". Favre's daughter Mary stated that he died on July 21, but an obituary that appeared in a New Orleans newspaper on July 20 gives his death date as July 3. Several years after his death, in 1817 or 1818, his widow married Isaac Graves, with whom she had one additional child, and they lived in Pearlington, Mississippi. Graves had been the operator of Favre's schooner, Pearl, and had very little estate, but following his marriage to Favre's widow, he utilized Favre's estate as his own, much to the disadvantage of Favre's heirs.

== Favre's "wives" ==
While a young translator for France and Spain and France again among the Chicasaw, Favre began a relationship with a native woman named Pistikiokonay, a daughter of Franchimastabé. Pisiskiokonay's mother was Chamnay, listed as one of two wives of Franchimastabé in the deed attached to Dancing Rabbit Treaty. Favre sired at least six children with Pistikiokonay, the first of whom was born in about 1784, and includes Alexander Farve, who later married Cuna.

In 1800, an illegitimate son, Simon, Jr., by Brazilian slave buyer Rebecca Ousten, was later named prominently in his will which was taken to court by the legitimate heirs; but, the will stood. In 1801, the second of a large number of slave exchanges took place between Favre and Ousten as he prepared to marry Celeste Rochon. Favre and Rochon wed on March 25, 1801, his first legal marriage, and by Rochon he had daughters Augustine Rochon and Luisa Farve of Mobile.

== Land holdings and slaves ==
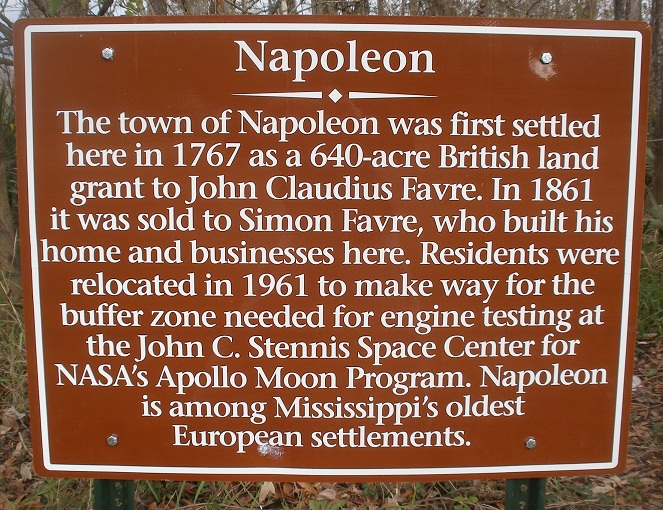
Historical marker at Napoleon, Mississippi; the Simon Favre information is erroneous unless this refers to a later generation Simon.

In 1806, Favre began cultivation of land on the Pearl River in what became Hancock County, Mississippi. Favre's land holdings were extensive, and his will mentions eight different plantations totalling over 5,000 acres (2,000 ha) in area. He also acquired 57 slaves shortly before his death, as they were not mentioned in his will, but later became prominently mentioned during the settlement of his estate. The October 1814 inventory of his personal property includes a list of the 57 slaves, giving the name, age, and value of each. The oldest was 80 and valued at $5 ($76.79 in 2025), while the most valuable was a thirty-year-old "cow hunter" valued at $900 ($13,821 in 2025). Collectively, the slaves were valued at just under $15,000 ($230,357 in 2025). The inventory also mentioned 6,200 arpents (5,247 acres [2,123 ha]) of land valued at $2,410 ($37,011 in 2025), a schooner named Pearl, and 450 head of cattle.

One of Favre's properties on the Pearl River was originally settled by his father in 1767, and was inherited by Favre upon his father's death in 1782. This plantation later became known as the town of Napoleon, and Favre kept a store there that later became a part of the community's church. In 1961 all the residents of the town were moved when the property was declared within the buffer zone of the John C. Stennis Space Center. Another one of his Pearl River properties became the town of Pearlington, Mississippi, where many of his children, including those of his Choctaw mistress, lived.

Though Favre lived in Hancock County in West Florida, and died in Mobile, Mississippi Territory, documents concerning his estate were also filed in New Orleans, Louisiana, probably by his Hancock County attorney, Rutillius Pray of Pearlington. By 1826, the estate had been partially settled, and during the October court term Pray submitted a final settlement showing total sales from the estate of just under $27,000 ($768,309 in 2025) – including nearly $22,000 ($626,029 in 2025) for slaves – while total debts amounted to nearly $33,000 ($939,044 in 2025). However, taking into account unsold assets, the estate appears to have been solvent.

== Family ==
Favre's earliest known children were with his Choctaw mistress named Pistikiokonay. This woman lived in what later became Lauderdale County, Mississippi, though most of her children moved to Hancock County where Favre had two large plantations along the Pearl River. Favre had six known or suspected children with her, the earliest born about 1784, and the last possibly born about 1805, though without birth records there is uncertainty among most of the birth years. The oldest child was likely Alexis (male), born about 1784 (based on a deposition he made in 1844, calling himself aged 60); he married a Choctaw named Cuna and had several children. A second child, Katherine, died after 1830 without issue. Louis, possibly the third child, had a wife named "Milisew" and four children; he died between 1830 and 1835. Charles, born about 1798 (deposed in 1856 that he was 58 years old), married Carmelite LaFontaine, had several children, and died by 1868. Mary, born about 1800 (aged 70 in the 1870 census), never married, but was highly respected in the family and became the administratrix of her father's estate. Favre's youngest child with his Choctaw mistress appears to be Jean Baptiste, usually just called Baptiste, who was born about 1805 (aged about 40 in 1845), married a woman named Toshowahoke, and had two children.

In 1800, Favre had an illegitimate son with Rebecca Austin (also called Rosella Ostein), a native of Tombigbee in the District of Mobile. The child, named Simon, was born February 5, 1800. Favre left a bequest to the child in 1812 so that he could "be taught to read and write and to learn a trade or profession."

Favre had six children with his legal wife, Celeste Rochon, the oldest of whom was Jean (John), born August 2, 1802, died January 7, 1888, and married Dianna Edwards. Augustine (Gus) was born July 17, 1804, and had two wives, Eleanor and Mary Jane, whose maiden names are uncertain. The third child of this marriage, Onezan (Nezan), was born December 23, 1806, died May 10, 1875, and married Mary Moody. Next was Louisa Eucharist, born May 15, 1809, who married first James Conerly, and then John L. Armstrong. The fifth child was Marguerite, born January 17, 1812, died February 6, 1908, and married James Murphy. The last child of this marriage was Carlota, who was confirmed in New Orleans in February 1813, and thus does not appear in her father's 1812 will. She is not mentioned as an heir of Simon, so may have died young.

Probably the best known of Favre's descendants is former National Football League quarterback Brett Favre, who descends from Simon and Pisiskiokonay's blessing by her father, through their son Alexander. Alex went on to marry Cuna, daughter of Pushmataha.

== See also ==
- History of Mississippi
- History of Alabama
- History of Louisiana
- History of Florida
- Republic of West Florida
