= Commentaries on American Law =

Book by James Kent

Commentaries on American Law is a four-volume book by James Kent. It was adapted from his lectures at Columbia Law School starting in 1794. It was first published in 1826 by O. Halsted and has been reprinted and revised many times since. A twelfth edition was edited by Oliver Wendell Holmes Jr. A fourteenth edition edited by John M. Gould was published in 1896, and a fifteenth edition edited by Jon Roland was published 1997-2002.

== Reviews ==
In 1847, commenting on the fifth edition, J. G. Marvin said:

Borrowed as much of our law is from various sources, and changed somewhat in the introduction either by legislation or judicial construction, to adapt it to our institutions, together with the variant local law, and the federal jurisprudence, to methodize and explain this complex system, is the labour that our author assumed when he undertook to write Commentaries on American Law. Such a task required no ordinary knowledge of the sources and growth of our diversified field of jurisprudence, no ordinary skill and judgement in selecting the materials, and presenting them in an Institutional form, and no ordinary style to make them attractive. It has, however, been satisfactorily accomplished. The Commentaries were written after a period in the author's life, when, by the laws of his native State, his mental powers were supposed to be impaired by reason of his great age, and to render him unfit for duly performing his judicial duties, and to the existence of that provision we are probably indebted for the work. England has only furnished one Blackstone, and the American rivals him in classic purity and elegance of style, and surpasses him in extent and copiousness of learning. What do Sir William Blackstone's Commentaries contain, of Equity Jurisprudence, of the Law of Nations, and the several titles of Commercial Law, which are discussed with such richness and accuracy by Chancellor Kent? Scarcely nothing, and a comparison of other titles in the two works shows the American author to have surpassed his rival in comprehensiveness of research, and fulness of illustration, and to have equalled him in clearness and cogency of reasoning.

He does not scruple to use the learning of other writers when to his purpose, which reappears with the additional outpourings of his own well stored mind, and his criticisms upon their merits are judicious and highly instructive, as denoting the several sources and the value of the information to be derived from them. Several titles of the law which properly require distinct treatises to unfold, or are so peculiarly local as not to be adapted to the plan of his Commentaries, such as Practice of the Courts, Criminal Law, Evidence, Actions and Pleadings, the author omits. It is scarcely necessary to add, what is so well known, that the American Commentaries is a text book of the highest character for accuracy, that it is a work which no lawyer thinks of doing without, and that its reputation and usefulness is not wholly confined to the United States. Mr. Johnes, and English author, in alluding to the Commentaries, says: "They may be recommended to the English law student of the present day, as a substitute for Blackstone. They contain not only a clear statement of the English law, with all the alterations that have taken place since the time of Blackstone, but a full account of the main principles of Equity, (a topic on which the English Commentator is confessedly deficient;) also, a review of the modifications engrafted on the English law by the different States of the Union - and on all important questions, an instructive parallel between the English, American, Modern Continental, and Civil Laws." Mr. Manning also remarks of the Commentaries, that "They are fine examples of lucid and manly reasoning, and the style in which they are written is perspicuous and forcible. From the nature of the work, Chancellor Kent was only able to devote a small portion of his treatise to the Law of Nations; but their brevity is the only thing that is objectionable in these lectures, for all that the author does give us is valuable." And Professor Whiteside, in his Lecture before the Dublin Law Institute, observes of the Commentaries, that the subjects are discussed with the greatest ability and learning. "We have never, in any English work, met with a more full and satisfactory account of the rights and liabilities of infants, than is contained in the work before us. Before quitting this book we wish to say a few words as to its style, and of this we can scarcely speak in terms of sufficiently warm commendation. It is easy, clear, vigorous, unaffected." Mr. Robertson says: "We have learned the respect that is due to Professor Kent, the late Chancellor of the State of New York, author of the Commentaries on American Law, a name probably not inferior, as a legal writer, to any of the present day."

The venerable author has not been an inattentive observer of the progressive changes and developments of the law, since the first publication of his Commentaries, as will appear by an examination of the successive editions, each of which contains somewhat that is not in its predecessor. 1 Leg. Rep. 121; Manning's L. of N. 44; Hoff. Leg. Stu. 166, 324; 6 Pick. 310; Robertson on Personal Succession, 76, n; Smith's Mercantile Law, Intro. 7; Johnes' Chancery Reform, 22, n; Story's Conflict of Laws, Dedication; 1 Angel's Law Intel. 9; (2) 231; 2 U.S. Rev. & Lit. Gaz. 81; 24 A.J. 102; (25) 114; 3 L.R. 402; (6)289.
