= Richard Harison =

American politician

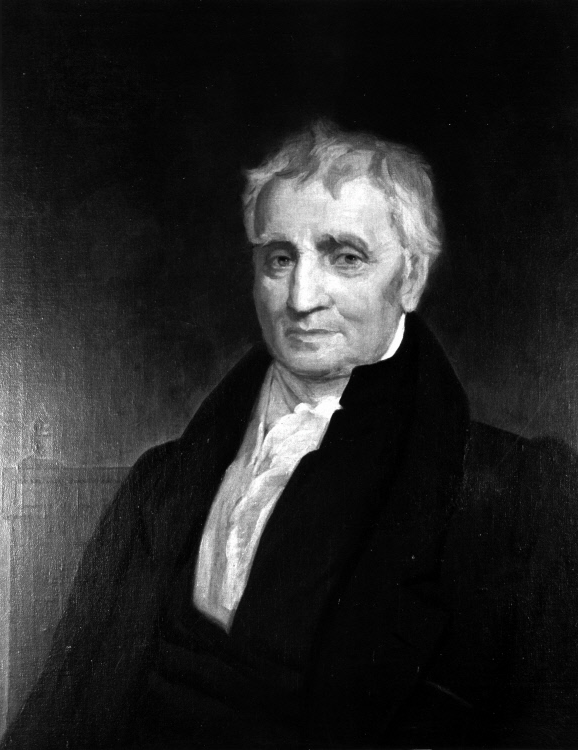
- Portrait of Richard Harison, after a miniature painted by Francis Martin Drexel

1st United States Attorney for the District of New York
- In office 1789–1801
- Appointed by: George Washington
- Succeeded by: Edward Livingston

Recorder of New York City
- In office 1798–1801
- Preceded by: James Kent
- Succeeded by: John Bartow Prevost

Personal details
- Born: January 23, 1748 New York City
- Died: December 7, 1829 (aged 81) New York City
- Party: Federalist
- Spouses: Maria Jones; Frances Duncan Ludlow
- Education: King's College
- Profession: Lawyer

Richard Harison (January 12, 1747 (O.S.), in New York City – December 7, 1829, in New York City) was an American lawyer and Federalist politician from New York.

== Life ==
He was the son of George Harison (son of Francis Harison) and Jane (Nicholls) Harison. He graduated with a Bachelor of Arts from King's College in 1764. He married Maria Jones, and their son was George Folliott Harison (1776–1846), the namesake of "Harison's Yellow Rose".

He practiced law in New York City in partnership with Alexander Hamilton. On September 4, 1783, Harison married Frances Duncan Ludlow (1766–1797; daughter of George Duncan Ludlow), and they had four children.

Harison was Deputy Grand Master of Masons of New York from 1786 to 1788. He was a delegate to the New York Convention which adopted the United States Constitution in 1788, and voted for adoption. He was a member of the New York State Assembly in 1788 and 1788–89.

In 1789, Harison was appointed by President George Washington as the first United States Attorney for the District of New York. He remained in office until 1801, and was also Recorder of New York City from 1798 to 1801.

He died in New York City on December 7, 1829, and was buried in a family vault in Trinity Church Cemetery.

== Legacy ==
Among the new proprietors of large tracts of land in Northern New York that had been part of the Macomb Purchase (1791), Richard Harison purchased great lots 6 and 9 in what would become Franklin County. These land owners initially named their sections after themselves, but "Harison" eventually became the Town of Malone. In 1808, Harison changed the name of the village he had founded to "Ezraville," after his friend Ezra L'Hommedieu. In 1812, Harison again changed the name of his village, to "Malone," after Edmond Malone, an Irish Shakespearean scholar. The Harison House is located on Webster Street in Malone, across from the cemetery, and is designated with a New York State historical marker.

== Sources ==
- The New York Civil List compiled by Franklin Benjamin Hough (pages 55 and 279; Weed, Parsons and Co., 1858)
- Richard Harison genealogy at North County website
- Trinity Church burial records
- Richard Harison Papers, 1734-1900, Rare Book and Manuscript Library, Columbia University.

Legal offices
Preceded by new office	U.S. Attorney for the District of New York; 1789–1801	Succeeded by Edward Livingston
Preceded by James Kent	Recorder of New York City; 1798–1801	Succeeded by John B. Prevost
