= 1812 Louisiana gubernatorial election =

- July 6, 1812
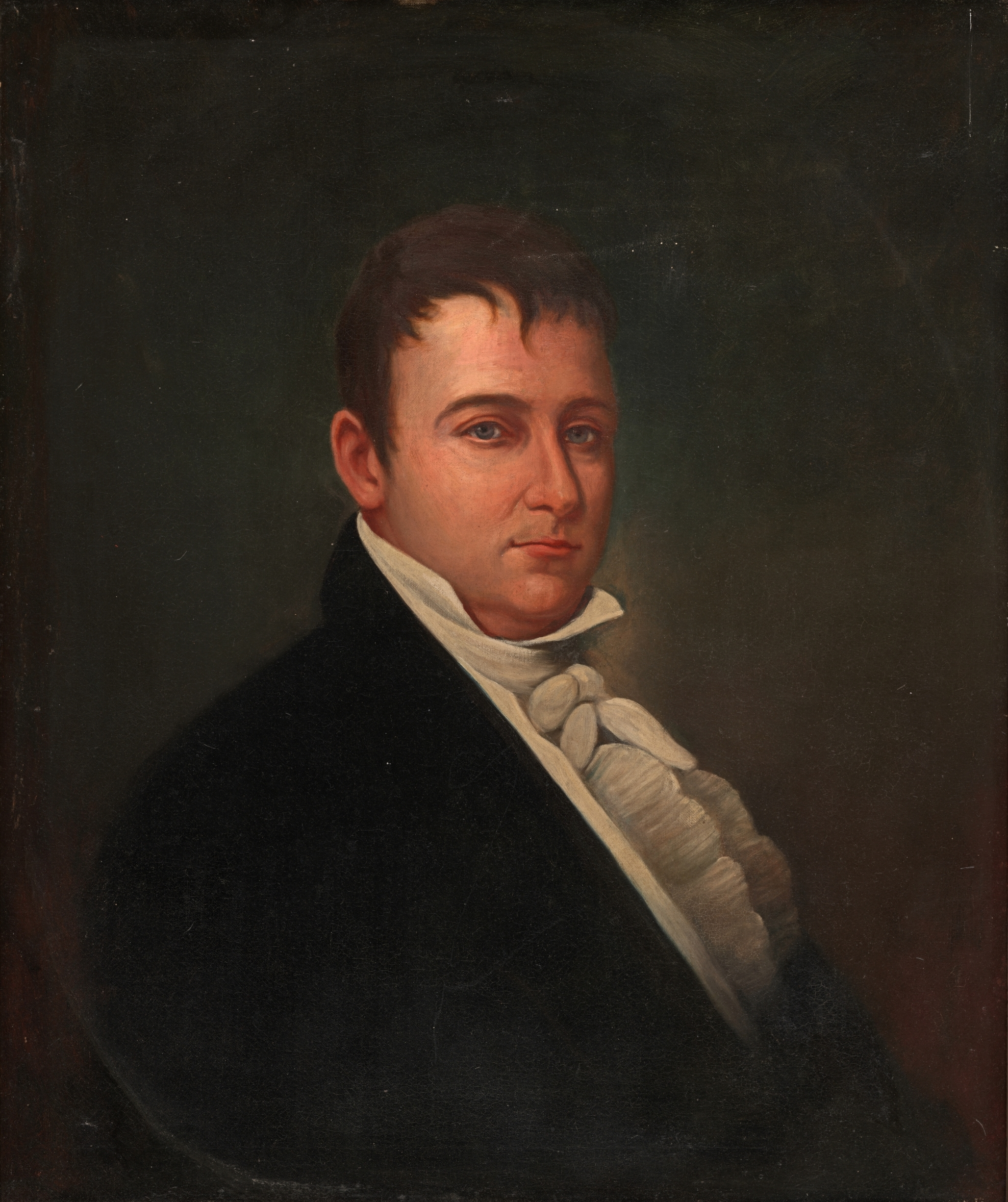

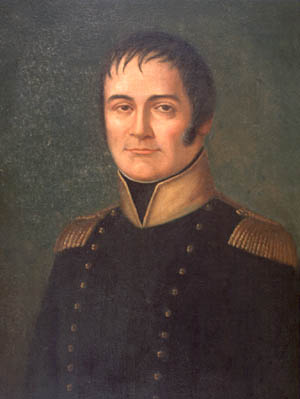

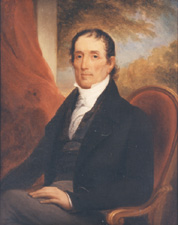
| Nominee | William C. C. Claiborne | Jacques Villeré | Jean Noël Destréhan |
| Party | Democratic-Republican | Democratic-Republican | Democratic-Republican |
| Electoral vote | 33 | 6 | 0 |
| Popular vote | 2,757 | 945 | 163 |
| Percentage | 71.17% | 24.42% | 4.34% |
- County/Parish Results (Note: The source provides the results inconsistently, sometimes by county and other times by parish.); Claiborne: 50–60% 70–80% 90–100% No Data
Governor before election
William C. C. Claiborne
Democratic-Republican
Elected Governor
William C. C. Claiborne
Democratic-Republican

The 1812 Louisiana gubernatorial election was the first gubernatorial election to take place after Louisiana achieved statehood. Under Article 3 Sec 2 of the 1812 Constitution of the State of Louisiana the Governor was elected in two steps. On the first Monday in July, eligible voters went to the polls and voted. The returns were sent to the President of the Louisiana State Senate. On the second day of the session of the Louisiana State Legislature, the Louisiana House of Representatives and Senate met in joint session and voted between the top two candidates. The candidate who received a majority in General Assembly became governor.

== General election ==
=== Candidates ===
- William C. C. Claiborne, incumbent Governor of the Territory of Orleans
- Jean Noël Destréhan, president of the legislative council of the Territory of Orleans
- Jacques Villeré, former first lieutenant in the French Army

Popular Vote

| Candidate | Votes received | Percentage |
|---|---|---|
| William C. C. Claiborne | 2,757 | 71.17% |
| Jacques Villeré | 946 | 24.42% |
| Jean Noël Destréhan | 168 | 4.34% |
| Scattering | 3 | 0.08% |

General Assembly Vote

| Candidate | Votes received | Percentage |
|---|---|---|
| William C. C. Claiborne | 33 | 84.62% |
| Jacques Villere | 6 | 15.38% |
| Total Vote | 39 | |

| Preceded by First | Louisiana gubernatorial elections | Succeeded by 1816 Louisiana gubernatorial election |
