= Concordia County, Territory of Orleans =

Administrative subdivision, 1805–1807

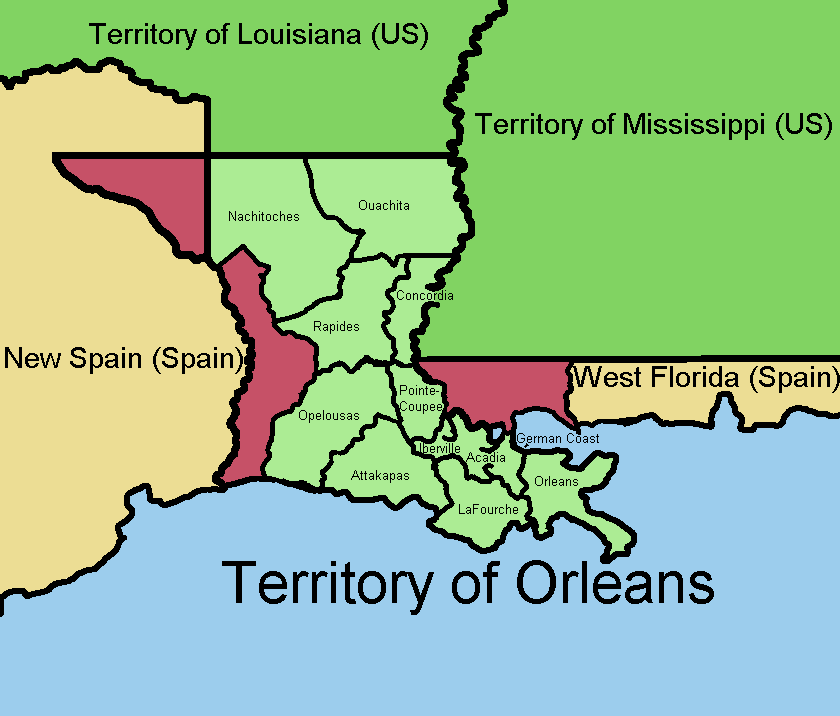
Map of Orleans Territory in 1804

Concordia County was one of the original 12 subdivisions of the Territory of Orleans, United States. It was extant from 1805 to 1807. The territorial counties were "extensive in area and the boundaries vaguely drawn, fixed...by describing them as composed of a certain parish or parishes. These latter ecclesiastical and military subdivisions were in effect during the French and Spanish dominations, their limits determined largely from the sphere of influence of the various parish churches." The statutory boundaries of Concordia County were "Beginning at the mouth of Red River, then ascending the same to Black River, then along the Black River to the Tensas River; along the same to the Tensas Lake; thence by a right line easterly to the Mississippi River, and thence down the same to the point of beginning." Concordia County encompassed what is now Concordia Parish, Tensas Parish, East Carroll Parish, Madison Parish, and the "eastern part of Franklin." Concordia was named for Don José Vidal's Spanish Post of Concord.
