= Joshua Lewis (judge) =

American judge and politician

Joshua Lewis (June 5, 1772 – 1833) was a judge of the Superior Court of the Territory of Orleans and, after Louisiana became a state, the 1st Judicial District Court of that state.

== Early life ==
Joshua Lewis was born in Leesburg, Virginia, in Loudoun County October 25, 1772, to Captain John Lewis and his wife Elizabeth Givens. John and Elizabeth Lewis had two other sons, William (born 1767) and Thomas (born 1774). Sometime in the 1780s, Joshua moved with his family to Jessamine County, Kentucky, where his father built a mill on the Kentucky River near what is now known as High Bridge. In 1790, Captain Lewis donated 100 acres of land to the Bethel Academy for Bishop Asbury to form a Methodist Episcopal School. Later, Joshua attended Cokesbury College, also established by Bishop Asbury in Abdington, Maryland. Joshua graduated in 1793 and the diploma resides at the Louisiana State Museum among the relics of Mrs. H.H. Bull.

Joshua married America Lawson, daughter of General Robert Lawson, on December 23, 1797. They had twelve children, 10 of whom lived past the age of 3: Sidonia Pierce (1798), John Lawson (1800), Louisa Marie (1801), Theodore (1803), Eliza (1804), Alfred Jefferson (1808), Twins Hampden and Sidney (1810), George Washington (1814), and Benjamin Franklin (1818).

John Lawson Lewis became both Mayor and Sheriff of New Orleans and as a teen ran messages for General Jackson during the Battle of New Orleans, later fighting in the Civil War as a Brigadier General of the Louisiana State Militia. Algernon Sidney became a lawyer and was father of Ernest Sidney Lewis (famous gynecologist); Theodore, a major in the Mexican American War and a Confederate veteran; Alfred Jefferson (lawyer and judge); and George Washington (planter in the Algiers district).

== Career ==
Lewis graduated from Washington and Lee University, having studied law, and settled his family in Jessamine County, Kentucky, near Lexington, in 1798. He was appointed the prosecutor for Jessamine County that year and was elected to the Kentucky House of Representatives in 1799, 1803 and 1804. He was a political advisor to Henry Clay.

In 1803, President Thomas Jefferson completed the Louisiana Purchase. While it is frequently reported that Jefferson sent Lewis to New Orleans, together with Edward Livingston and James Brown, as commissioners to receive the purchased territory from the French, Lewis was not sent by Jefferson until 1805, and then to be a commissioner to deal with land titles. In 1806, Lewis was appointed as one of three judges of the Superior court of the Territory of Orleans.

When Louisiana was admitted into the Union in 1812, Lewis and the other judges of the territorial Superior Court continued in their posts, under the 'schedule' of the State constitution, until the Supreme Court was selected. He was then made judge of the 1st judicial district. He served under Andrew Jackson in the War of 1812, participating as the captain of an organized military company in the night attack on the British of December 23, 1814, during the Battle of New Orleans. In 1816, he ran for Governor against Jacques Villeré. The political division in the state then was between French and Spanish Creoles and newly arrived Anglo-Americans. Villeré, the Creole candidate, narrowly defeated Lewis.

Lewis remained a state judge until his death in New Orleans in 1833. He was buried beside his wife near Madisonville, Louisiana, on the west bank of the Tchefuncte River.

== Memorials ==
Upon his death, the members of the bar desired to erect a monument to his memory, but his children declined the honor, because their father had requested that he should rest in the same spot with his wife. The lake front of his country seat in St. Tammany Parish was then sold in town lots, and named Lewisburg, in his honor. Lewisburg is an unincorporated community.

== See also ==
- John L. Lewis (New Orleans), his son

Political offices
Preceded by unknown	Kentucky State Representative; 1799, 1803, 1804	Succeeded by unknown
Legal offices
Preceded by John Bartow Prevost	Judge of the Superior Court of the Territory of Orleans; 1807–1813	Succeeded by Court abolished
Preceded by newly created seat	Judge, 1st Judicial District Court of Louisiana; 1813–1833	Succeeded by unknown
