= John Bartow Prevost =

American attorney, judge, politician, businessman and diplomat (1766–1825)

Recorder of New York City
- In office 1801–1804
- Preceded by: Richard Harison
- Succeeded by: Maturin Livingston

Judge of the Superior Court of the Territory of Orleans
- In office 1804–1808
- Preceded by: N/A
- Succeeded by: Joshua Lewis

American Consul at Lima, Peru
- In office 1818 – March 5, 1825

Personal details
- Born: March 6, 1766 Paramus, Province of New Jersey
- Died: March 5, 1825 (aged 58) Lima, Peru
- Party: Democratic-Republican
- Spouse: Frances Anna Smith
- Relatives: Aaron Burr
- Occupation: attorney, judge, diplomatic agent

John Bartow Prevost (March 6, 1766 – March 5, 1825) was an American attorney, judge, politician, businessman and diplomat. He became the first judge of the Superior Court of the Territory of Orleans from 1804 to 1808, and was U.S. political agent for Peru from 1818 until his death.

== Early life and family ==
Prevost was born on March 6, 1766, in Paramus, New Jersey. His father Col. Jacques Marcus Prevost had emigrated from Geneva, Republic of Geneva, to Britain with his brother General Augustine Prevost, and rose in the British Army to command British forces in New Jersey and was briefly governor of Georgia during the American Revolutionary War before moving to the British West Indies to recover from his wounds and dying in Jamaica in 1779. His widow (and J.B. Prevost's mother), Theodosia Bartow, was a New Jersey native (only daughter of Theodore Bartow of Shrewsbury) and patriot during that war. In 1782, the widow married Aaron Burr. Burr (who would become Vice President of the United States under Thomas Jefferson) raised Theodosia's sons John and Frederick as his own.

John B. Prevost married Frances Anna Smith, daughter of Rev. Samuel Smith, of Princeton College on February 5, 1799. They had four children: Theodosia Ann Prevost (1801–1864), James Marcus Prevost (1803–1829), Stanhope Prevost (1804–1868) and Frances Prevost Breckinridge (1806–1870).

== Public service ==
Prevost was Recorder of New York City from 1801 to 1804, when President Thomas Jefferson appointed him as one of the first three judges of the Superior Court of the Territory of Orleans. Arriving in New Orleans on October 29, 1804, Prevost opened the Superior Court with a charge to the grand jury on Monday, November 5, 1804. Prevost served alone on that bench from November 5, 1804, for about two years, due to the death and refusal to take office of his fellow judges. In 1808, Prevost resigned from the bench and was replaced by Joshua Lewis of Kentucky. Prevost remained in New Orleans and practiced law for several years.

In 1818, President James Monroe appointed Prevost as American Commissioner to examine the state of Spanish colonies in South America. Secretary of State John Quincy Adams tasked Prevost to secure the Oregon Territory as reparations from the British government for the War of 1812 as spelled out in the Treaty of Ghent.

Prevost moved his family to Peru, where he worked until his death on March 5, 1825, although his formal nomination as Chargé d'affaires was withdrawn before the Senate could approve it. His son Stanhope Prevost became a prominent merchant in Lima with Edward McCall (American consul at Lima 1843–1851), married a Peruvian woman and had children, becoming like his father the American consul in Lima (1851–1853) and dying there in 1868. His son Henry S. Prevost (J.B. Prevost's grandson) then liquidated the firm.

== See also ==
- John Witherspoon Smith – 1820s U.S. Attorney in New Orleans, brother-in-law

Legal offices
Preceded by Richard Harison	Recorder of New York City; 1801–1804	Succeeded by Maturin Livingston
Preceded by new office	Judge of the Superior Court of the Territory of Orleans; 1804–1808	Succeeded by Joshua Lewis
