= Pierre-Clément de Laussat =

French politician

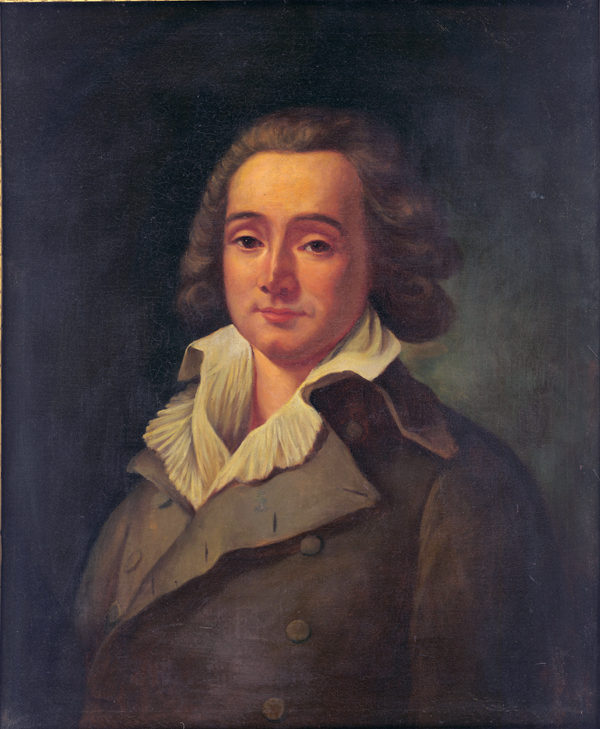
- Posthumous (c. 1911) portrait of Pierre-Clément de Laussat by Andres Molinary

2nd Commandant of French Guiana
- In office 1819–1823
- Monarch: Louis XVIII
- Preceded by: Claude Carra de Saint-Cyr
- Succeeded by: Pierre Bernard Milius

2nd Colonial Prefect of Martinique
- In office 1804–1809
- Monarch: Napoléon I
- Preceded by: Charles-Henri Bertin
- Succeeded by: Sir George Beckwith; British Occupation

1st Colonial Prefect of Louisiana (French First Republic)
- In office 1803–1803
- Monarchs: Napoléon Bonaparte; First Consul of France
- Preceded by: Juan Manuel de Salcedo as Spanish Governor of Louisiana
- Succeeded by: William C.C. Claiborne as Governor of the Territory of Orleans; William Henry Harrison Sr. as Governor of the Louisiana District

Personal details
- Born: 23 November 1756 Bernadets, France
- Died: 10 April 1835 (aged 78) Bernadets, France
- Spouse: Marie-Anne-Joséphine de Péborde de Pardiès (m. 1790; died 1827)
- Children: 5
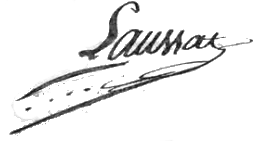
- Signature

Military service
- Allegiance: Kingdom of France; French First Republic; Kingdom of France
- Awards: Order of Saint Louis; Chevalier

Pierre-Clément de Laussat (French pronunciation: [pjɛʁ klemɑ̃ də losa]; 23 November 1756 – 10 April 1835) was a French politician and the last French colonial governor of Louisiana, handing over the territory to the United States after the Sale of Louisiana. He later served as colonial official in Martinique and French Guiana, as well as an administrator in France and Antwerp.

== Biography ==
Laussat was born at his family's estate, Château de Bernadets, and baptised at Saint-Martin's Church in Pau. After serving as receveur général des finances in Pau and Bayonne from 1784 to 1789, he was imprisoned during the Terror, but was released and recruited in the armée des Pyrénées. On 17 April 1797, he was elected to the Council of Ancients. After the coup of 18 Brumaire, he entered the Tribunat on 25 December 1798, having renounced his noble rank earlier that year.

=== Louisiana ===
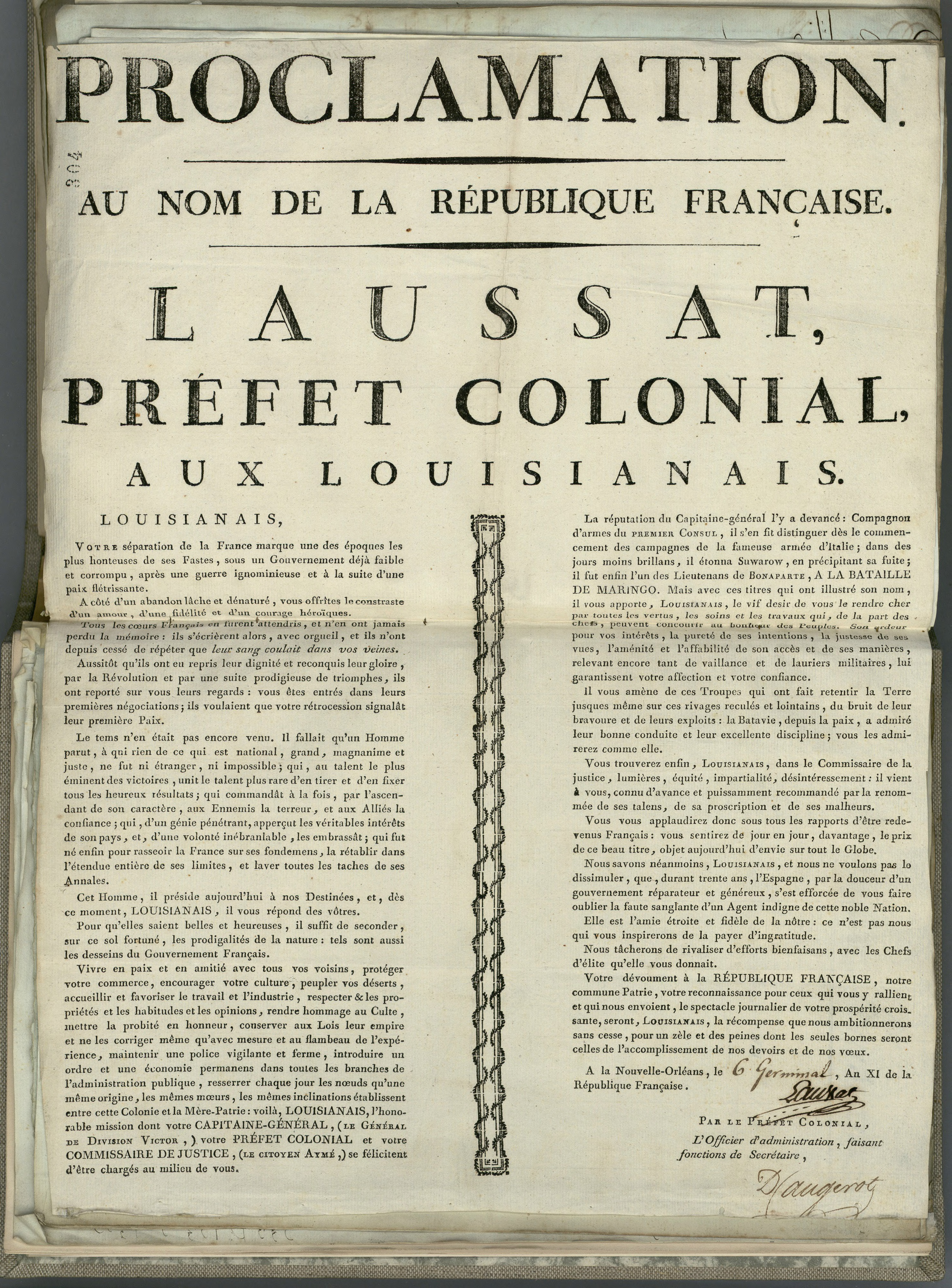
Laussat's proclamation regarding the restoration of Louisiana to France (27 March 1803)

He was appointed by First Consul Napoleon Bonaparte (soon-to-be emperor) to be colonial prefect (or governor) of Louisiana in August 1802 and arrived in the colony on 26 March 1803. In his procolomation introducing himself and his fellow Republican colonial administrators, Laussat described the transfer of Louisiana from France to Spain as "... one of the most shameful epochs of her [France's] glory, under an already weak and corrupt Government, after an ignominious war and following a withering peace." He praised Bonaparte's desire to regain Louisiana and to see the colony thrive. Laussat also provided an outline for how the colony would be governed with a captain general overseeing internal and external defense of the colony; a colonial prefect overseeing administration and finances; and a commissary of justice overseeing civil and criminal tribunals. Two weeks later, Bonaparte made his decision to sell Louisiana to the United States.

Laussat was initially only to be the interim head of Louisiana until arrival of the Governor General Jean-Baptiste Bernadotte appointed by Bonaparte. However, when Bonaparte rejected Bernadotte's request for additional settlers and support for the posting, Bernadotte declined the governorship. Sailing from Île d'Aix, France, on the Surveillant in January 1803, Laussat and his family arrived in New Orleans on 26 March 1803. Under an agreement with Spain, Louisiana would not be formally handed over to France until French soldiers could arrive to manage the security of the territory. Despite this, Laussat assumed control of the colonial administration in the name of Bonaparte and the French Republic.

Laussat envisioned bringing forth a rebirth of a prosperous French La Nouvelle-Orléans. He saw in Creole courtesies and effusive welcomes a sense of French pride and identity ready to embrace Bonapartist rule; however, not all Louisianans were eager to see Republican France in control of the city. Fearful of anti-clerical sentiments in the French Republic, three-fifths of the Ursaline sisters in New Orleans, along with their mother-superior, decided to abandon the city and head to Havana when the Spanish handed over the city. Laussat and other French officials were contemptuous towards the Spanish officials in charge of the territory; he contrasted the "Spanish spirit" as senile, corrupt, racially weak and effeminately degenerate with the "austerity, efficiency, and virility" of Bonapartist republicanism. The city's Creole elite were concerned over how the French Republic would approach taxation and slavery, among other issues.

Within several months, while he waited for the promised troops to arrive, Laussat heard that Louisiana had been sold to the U.S.; however, he did not believe it. Letters sent to him in June had failed to arrive. On 28 July 1803, he wrote to the French government to inquire whether the rumor was true. On 18 August 1803, he received word from Bonaparte via the French ambassador to the United States, Louis-André Pichon, that Britain had declared war on France and that he was to transfer Louisiana to the United States.

On 30 November 1803, Laussat served as commissioner of the French government in the retrocession of Louisiana from Spain to France. Although the handover to the United States was expected to be happen quickly, during the 20 days of his administration, Laussat made several bold moves, including abolishing the local cabildo. He also established a fire brigade and reorganized the militia. To replace the cabildo, Laussat assembled a twelve-member municipal council, made up primarily of wealthy Creoles and two Americans (excluding any Spanish officials), and appointed sugar planter Étienne de Boré as mayor. The council moved swiftly to reinstate the restrictions on enslaved people originally enacted as part of the Code Noir of 1724.

A few weeks later, on 20 December 1803, Laussat transferred the colony to the U.S. representatives, William C.C. Claiborne and James Wilkinson. Though he completed his diplomatic duties as required, the sale of Louisiana and its short circuiting his dreams for a revival of French North America was a grave disappointment for Laussat. In his diary, writing about the transfer of Louisiana to the Americans, he stated: "I will say no more of the country; it is too painful to have known it and then to have been separated from it."

Laussat's time in Louisiana was marked by conflicts with the Spanish officials he was replacing, as well as machinations by American merchants resident in the territory. He also never gained the full confidence of the wealthy Creole elite, especially once it was clear the expected troops under General Claude Perrin Victor were not going to arrive. The situation worsened for Laussat as he engaged in an increasingly public feud with Victor's adjutant-general, André Burthe, who had accompanied Laussat on the Surveillant. An additional cause for Spanish offense was Laussat's unilaterally freeing a man, Louis St. Julien, imprisoned for murdering his wife, claiming that St. Julien had been persecuted by Spanish officials for addressing people with the revolutionary title citoyen.

=== Martinique ===
On 21 April 1804, Laussat left Louisiana to become colonial prefect of Martinique, serving until 1809 when he was captured during the British invasion of Martinique and imprisoned.

In Martinique, Laussat again found himself struggling to reconcile Bonapartist ideals with the interests of local elites. He clashed with Captain-General Villaret–Joyeuse, who had popular support on the island, over appointments and their respective spheres of authority. He antagonized planters and merchants by closing most of the island's ports to foreign trade and in the way he enforced taxes. Of particular importance to Laussat was ensuring the clergy on the island were loyal to the Bonapartist regime and would maintain civil records according to the civil code. This caused a conflict because the civil code called for only two banns to record a wedding instead of the three traditionally required in Catholicism.

=== France ===
In 1810, Laussat returned to France and sought a new governmental posting. He was sent to the French Netherlands to oversee the port of occupied Antwerp (1810–1812) and then to serve as prefect of Jemmape (1812–1814) where public works like highways and canals occupied much of his attention. In 1814, he was made a baron and elected to the Chamber of Deputies. During the Hundred Days, he served as prefect of Pas-de-Calais until the defeat of Napoleon at Waterloo. In 1819, he was made a chevalier of the Order of Saint Louis.

=== French Guiana ===
During the Bourbon Restoration, he served as commandant of French Guiana from 1819 to 1823, during which time he advanced efforts to attract American farmers and settlers to the colony. Laussat had been impressed during his short tenure in Louisiana by the way Americans had settled the trans-Appalachian region and he envisioned a similar settlement plan for a site in the Kourou watershed. Only two small groups arrived to found the short-lived settlement of Laussadelphie. As governor, he oversaw the completion of the Canal de Sartine in Cayenne, which had begun under Jean Samuel Guisan in 1777. Laussat inaugurated the completed canal, which now bears his name, on 12 December 1821.

In 1823, Laussat retired to his ancestral château in France where he died in 1835.

== Personal life ==
In September 1790, Laussat married Marie-Anne-Joséphine de Péborde de Pardiès (1768–1827), the daughter of Laussat's mentor, Jean-Nicolas de Péborde, seigneur de Cardesse. They had three daughters — Zoë (b. 1791), Sophie Fanny (b. 1793), and Camille (b. 1797) — and one son, Lysis Baure Pierre (b.1795). A fourth daughter, Marie-Clémentine, was born in New Orleans in 1804, but died before year-end.

The Laussat family held at least three people in slavery, including Marie's domestic servant, Solitude, who travelled with her from Louisiana to Martinique and eventually to France.

== Bibliography ==
- Faber, Eberhard L. (2016). "The Passion of Citizen Laussat". Building the Land of Dreams: New Orleans and the Transformation of Early America. Princeton, New Jersey: Princeton University Press. ISBN 978-0-691-16689-6.
- Laussat, Pierre-Clément de (1831). Mémoires sur ma vie à mon fils: pendant les années 1803 et suivantes, que j'ai rempli des fonctions publiques, savoir à la Louisianne, en qualité de commissaire du gouvernement français pour la reprise de possession de cette colonie et pour sa remise aux Etats-Unis; à la Martinique, comme préfet colonial; à la Guyane française, en qualité de commandant et administrateur pour le roi [Memoirs on my Life to My Son During the Years 1803 and following, that I Filled Public Office in Louisiana, as Commissioner of the French Government for the Repossession of This Colony and for Surrender to the United States; in Martinique, as Colonial Prefect; and in French Guiana, as Commander and Administrator for the King] (in French). Pau, France: É. Vignancour, Imprimeur - Libaire.
- Laussat, Pierre Clement de (1978) [1831]. Bush, Robert D. (ed.). Memoirs of My Life: Beyond the Bayou. Translated by Pastwa, Agnes-Josephine. Baton Rouge, Louisiana: LSU Press. ISBN 978-0-8071-2870-1.
- Laussat, Pierre-Clément de (1989) [1831]. Lebel, Maurice (ed.). Louisiana, Napoleon and the United States: An Autobiography of Pierre-Clément de Laussat, 1756-1835. Translated by Pastwa, Agnes-Josephine. Lanham, Maryland: University Press of America. ISBN 978-0-8191-7448-2.
- Kuka, Jon; Rosal, Angelita; Lemmon, Alfred Emmette, eds. (1993). A Guide to the Papers of Pierre Clément Laussat: Napoleon's Prefect for the Colony of Louisiana and of General Claude Perrin Victor at the Historic New Orleans Collection. New Orleans, Louisiana: The Historic New Orleans Collection. ISBN 978-0-917860-33-1.

=== References ===
Government offices
Preceded by Juan Manuel de Salcedo; As Governor of Spanish Louisiana	Governor of French Republic Louisiana; 1803	Succeeded by William C.C. Claiborne; As Governor of the Territory of Orleans; William Henry Harrison Sr. as Governor of the Louisiana District
Preceded by Charles-Henri Bertin	Colonial Prefect of Martinique; 1804–1809	Succeeded by George Beckworth; British Occupation
Preceded by Claude Carra Saint-Cyr	Commandant of French Guiana; 1819–1823	Succeeded by Pierre Bernard Milius
