= James Kent (jurist) =

American jurist and legal scholar (1763–1847)

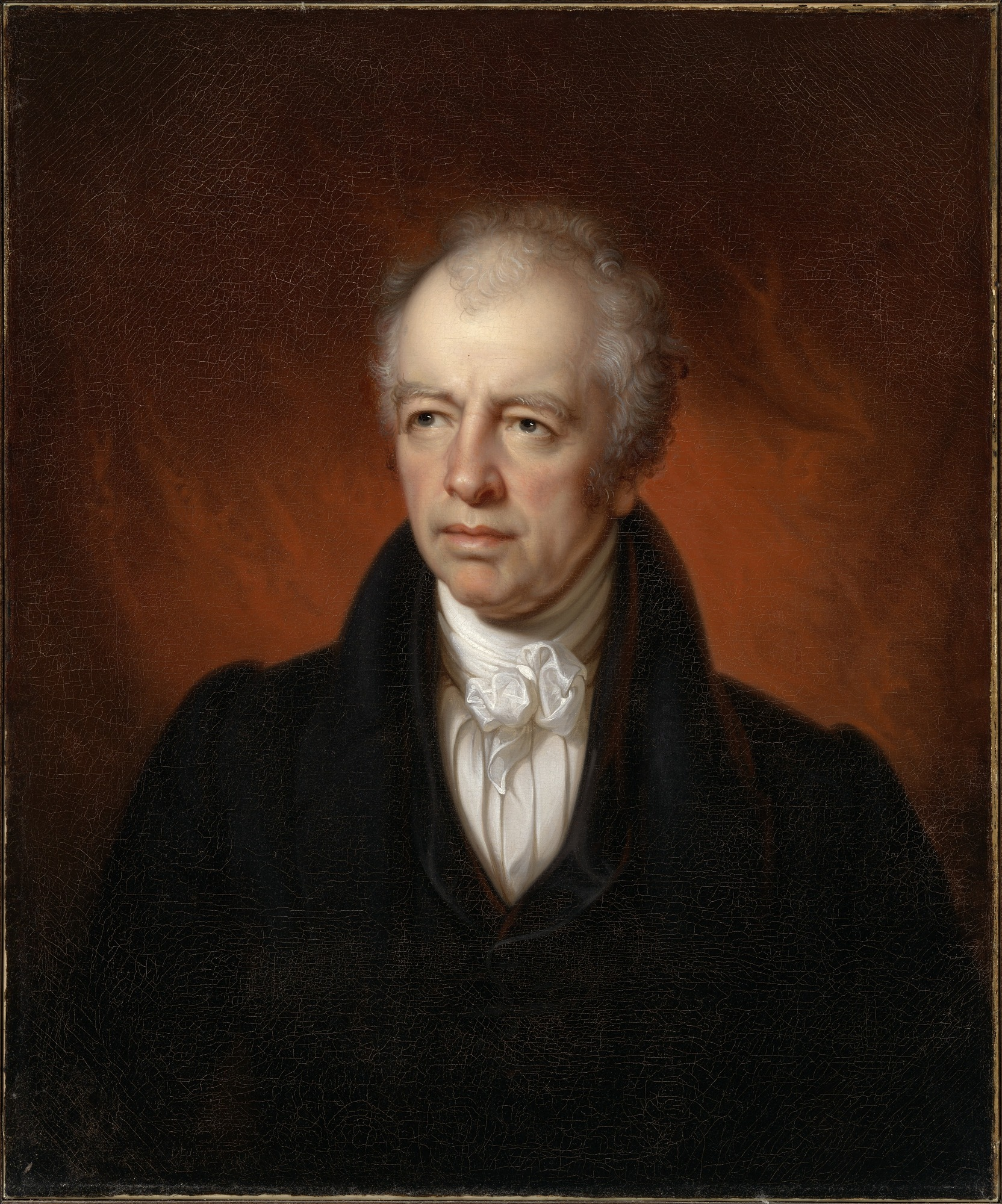
- Portrait by Rembrandt Peale, c. 1835

Recorder of New York City
- In office 1797–1798
- Preceded by: Samuel Jones
- Succeeded by: Richard Harison

Chief Justice of the New York Supreme Court
- In office 1804–1814
- Preceded by: Morgan Lewis
- Succeeded by: Smith Thompson

Chancellor of New York
- In office 1814–1823
- Preceded by: John Lansing Jr.
- Succeeded by: Nathan Sanford

Personal details
- Born: July 31, 1763 Fredericksburg, New York, British America
- Died: December 12, 1847 (aged 84) New York City, U.S.
- Relatives: Moss Kent (brother)
- Education: Yale College

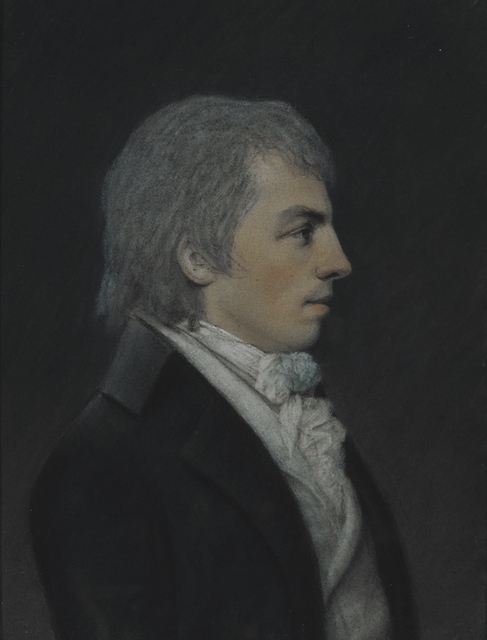
James Sharples, portrait of James Kent (1763–1847), 1798, pastel on paper, 8-7/8" x 6-15-16", gift of Edmund Astley Prentis, 1963 (C00.730), Avery Library, Columbia University

James Kent (July 31, 1763 – December 12, 1847) was an American jurist, New York legislator, legal scholar, and first Professor of Law at Columbia College. His Commentaries on American Law (based on lectures first delivered at Columbia in 1794, and further lectures in the 1820s) became the formative American law book in the antebellum era (published in 14 editions before 1896) and also helped establish the tradition of law reporting in America. He is sometimes called the "American Blackstone".

== Early life ==
Kent was born in what was then the town of Fredericksburg (the present-day towns of Patterson, Kent, Carmel, Southeast and Pawling) in Putnam and Dutchess Counties. His father, Moss Kent, was a lawyer in that county, as well as the first Surrogate of nearby Rensselaer County, New York. Despite interruptions caused by the American Revolutionary War, Kent graduated from Yale College in 1781, having helped establish Phi Beta Kappa society there in 1780. Returning to New York, Kent read law under Egbert Benson (then the state Attorney General and later a state judge).

== Early career ==
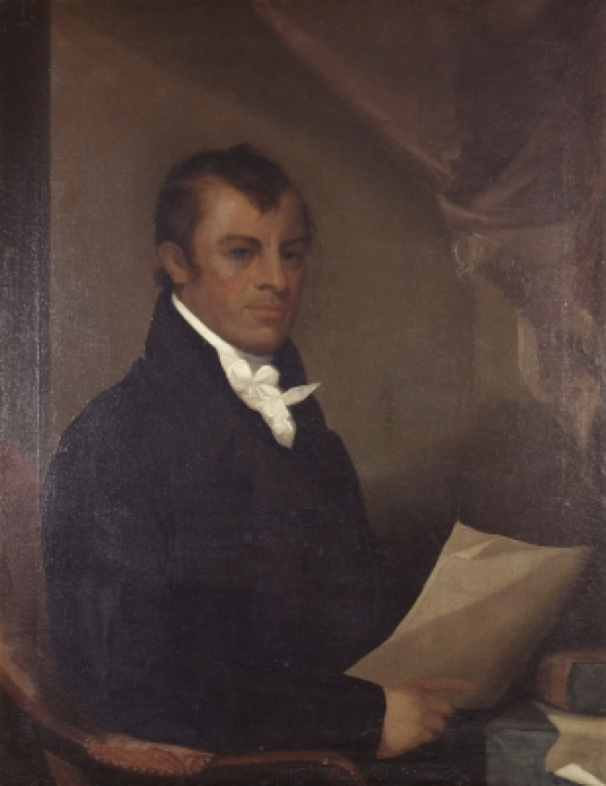
Ezra Ames (1768–1836) and Chancellor James Kent (1763–1847), c. 1812, oil on canvas, 36" x 28", gift of Miss Elizabeth S. Edwards and Mr. Henry Ames Edwards, 1946.97.1, Albany Institute of History & Art.

Admitted to the New York bar in January 1785, Kent began practicing law in Poughkeepsie, New York and neighboring areas. Voters in Dutchess County elected him in 1791 and 1792–93 as their representative in the New York State Assembly. He was also the Federalist candidate in the January 1793 election for the 5th congressional district, losing to Theodorus Bailey. However, he had married and supporting his growing family based on his scholarship and nearly rural legal practice proved difficult.

In 1793, Kent moved his family to New York City, where he had been appointed the first professor of law in Columbia College, where he would teach (part-time) for the next five years. He was soon appointed a master in chancery for the city. Kent again served in the Assembly in 1796–97. In 1797, he was appointed Recorder of New York City and in 1798, a justice of the New York Supreme Court, in 1804 Chief Justice, and in 1814 Chancellor of New York. Kent was also elected a member of the American Antiquarian Society in 1814.

In 1821, Kent was a member of the New York State Constitutional Convention where he unsuccessfully opposed the raising of the property qualification for African American voters. Two years later, Chancellor Kent reached the constitutional age limit and retired from his office, but was re-elected to his former chair. He was elected to the American Philosophical Society in 1829. He lived in retirement in Summit, New Jersey between 1837 and 1847 in a simple four-roomed cottage (the original cottage no longer stands and has been incorporated into a large mansion at 50 Kent Place) which he referred to as 'my Summit Lodge', a name that has been offered as the derivation for the city's name.

== Work ==
Kent has been long remembered for his Commentaries on American Law (four volumes, published 1826–1830), highly respected in England and America. The Commentaries treated state, federal and international law, and the law of personal rights and of property, and went through six editions in Kent's lifetime.

Kent rendered his most essential service to American jurisprudence while serving as chancellor. Chancery, or equity law, had been very unpopular during the colonial period, and had received little development, and no decisions had been published. His judgments of this class cover a wide range of topics, and are so thoroughly considered and developed as unquestionably to form the basis of American equity jurisprudence.

As chancellor, Kent inspired the development of modern American discovery by allowing masters to actively examine witnesses during depositions (rather than following the old English procedure of merely reading static interrogatories), and he allowed parties and counsel to be present for depositions. These innovations led to the modern deposition by oral examination. Depositions are still one of the most unique and distinctive aspects of civil procedure in the United States and Canada.

== Family ==
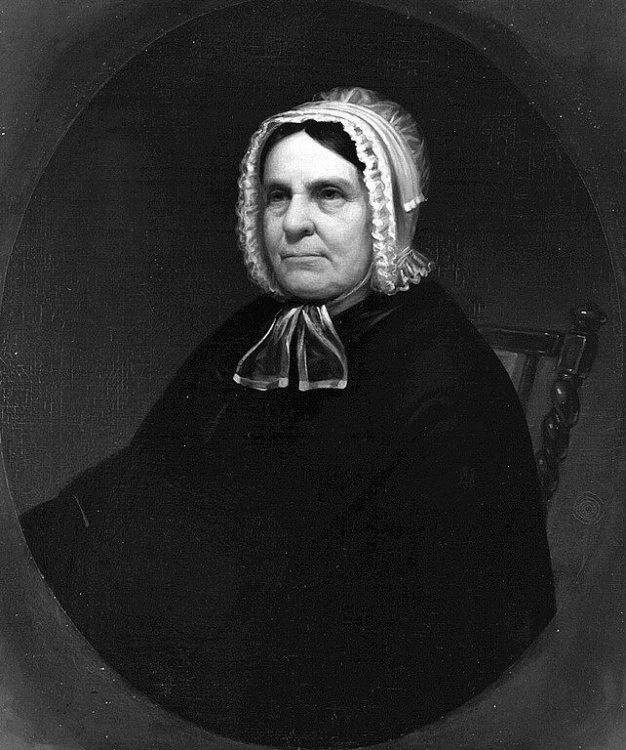
Elizabeth Bailey Kent, portrait by Daniel Huntington

Kent married Elizabeth Bailey, and they had four children: Elizabeth (died in infancy), Elizabeth, Mary, and William Kent (1802–1861) who was a circuit judge and ran for Lieutenant Governor of New York with Washington Hunt in 1852. His brother Moss Kent was a Congressman.

== Monuments and memorials ==
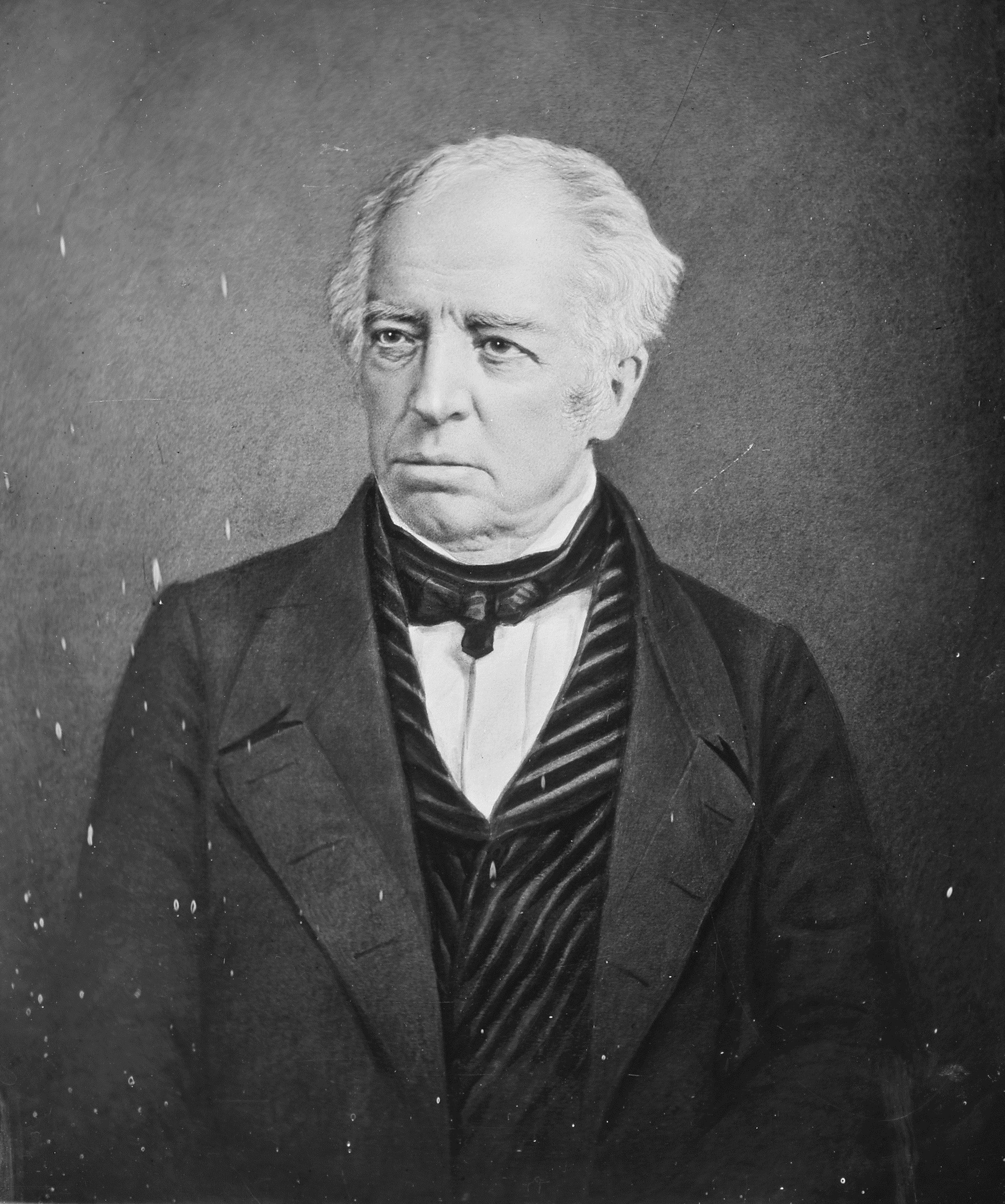
James Kent (c. 1860–1865), photography by Mathew Brady

In 1900, Kent was inducted into the Hall of Fame for Great Americans with a bust sculpted by Edmond Thomas Quinn. Chicago-Kent College of Law is named in his honor. The Chancellor Kent Professorship at Yale Law School is also named after him. Kent Place School, an independent all-girls school in New Jersey, is located where his summer house was. Kent County, Michigan, and Kent City, Michigan, are named in his honor, probably because he represented Michigan Territory in its dispute with Ohio over the Toledo Strip.

Kent's original "Summit Lodge" is now incorporated into a large mansion at 50 Kent Place Boulevard, Summit, New Jersey. Most of the original architecture including the kitchen and long room still exist today. Bronze statues of Chancellor Kent and Solon (the Athenian lawmaker whose reforms laid the foundations for democracy) represent law on the balustrade of the galleries of the Main Reading Room in the Thomas Jefferson Building of the Library of Congress on Capitol Hill in Washington, D.C. These statues are among sixteen representing men whose works have shaped human development and civilization. The Chancellor Kent Professorship at Columbia Law School is named after him, as is Kent Hall, which was built for the law school, but which now contains the C.V. Starr East Asian Library. Students who have high honors status (generally those who are in the top two to eight percent of the class) during any one of their years at Columbia Law School are called James Kent Scholars in honor of James Kent's status as Columbia's first professor of law.

Legal offices
Preceded by Samuel Jones	Recorder of New York City; 1797–1798	Succeeded by Richard Harison
Preceded by Morgan Lewis	Chief Justice of the New York Supreme Court; 1804–1814	Succeeded by Smith Thompson
Preceded by John Lansing Jr.	Chancellor of New York; 1814–1823	Succeeded by Nathan Sanford
