= Lafourche County, Territory of Orleans =

Administrative subdivision, 1805–1807

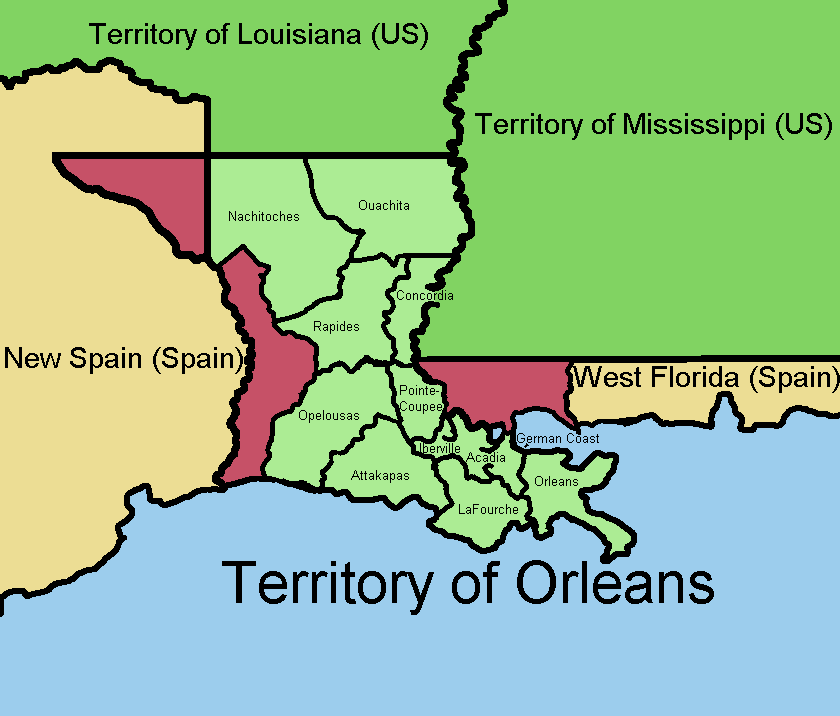
Map of Orleans Territory in 1804

Lafourche County was one of the original 12 subdivisions of the Territory of Orleans, United States. It was extant from 1805 to 1807. The territorial counties were "extensive in area and the boundaries vaguely drawn, fixed...by describing them as composed of a certain parish or parishes. These latter ecclesiastical and military subdivisions were in effect during the French and Spanish dominations, their limits determined largely from the sphere of influence of the various parish churches." Lafourche County encompassed "the parish of Assumption." The Church of Our Lady of the Lafourche of the Chitimachas of Valenzuela was established in 1772. Assumption of Our Lady of Lafourche, located in Plattenville, between Paincourtville and Napoleonville, was established in 1793. Lafourche County encompassed what is now Terrebonne Parish, Lafourche Parish, and most of Assumption Parish. The county and derivative entities were named for Bayou Lafourche, which in turn comes from the French description of the land of the Chitimacha people: "fork (La fourche) of the Chetimaches." The Post of Valenzuela near Bayou Lafourche was established by the French around 1786 and later transferred to the Spanish.
