= Charles-Henri Bertin =

French colonial official

1st Colonial Prefect of Martinique
- In office 1802–1804
- Monarch: Napoléon I
- Preceded by: Sir William Keppel as British Governor
- Succeeded by: Pierre-Clément de Laussat

Personal details
- Born: September 15, 1752 Louisbourg, Île-Royale
- Died: April 26, 1822 (aged 69) Moulins, Allier, France

Louis-Charles-Henri Bertin (September 15, 1752 – April 26, 1822) was a French civil official who served as the first Colonial Prefect of Martinique and St. Lucia.

== Biography ==
Bertin was born in Louisbourg, Île-Royale (modern Cape Breton), in 1752 to Louis Bertin, a surgeon, and Marie-Anne Bertrand. Following Britain's capture of Louisbourg from France, the Bertin family went to Rochefort, France.

As an adult, Bertin served as a senior civil servant in the Ministry of the Navy, which was charged with overseeing mercantile shipping, naval operations, and overseas colonies. Around 1792, Bertin served as a commissaire-ordonnateur for French naval forces in the Mediterranean, notably in 1793 aboard the Tonnant. By 1798, he had risen to the chief civilian officer for the Port of Bordeaux, before being transferred on July 12, 1798, to the Port of Toulon.

Bertin next served as the first maritime prefect for Le Havre from July 1800 to May 1801. At the port, he focused on construction of the bassin de la Barre, a system of locks to ease movement between the outer harbor and the bassin des Capucins, employing some 250 diggers and 60 stonecutters to complete the work. In September 1801, Bertin was promoted to counselor of the state for the navy, and was replaced as maritime prefect by Bourdon de Vatry.

== In Martinique ==
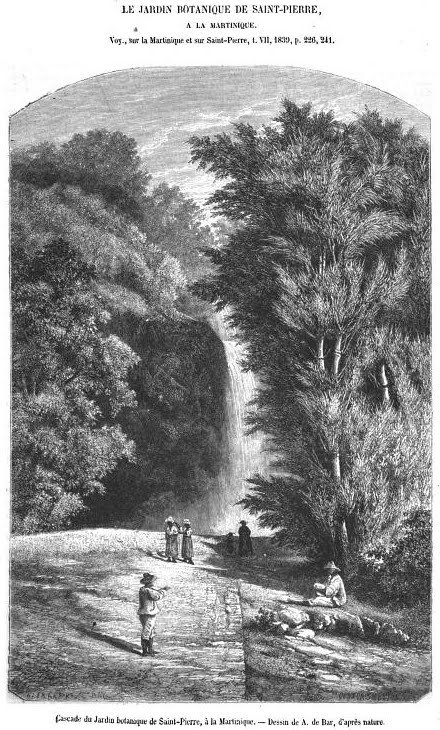
Waterfall in the jardin botanique de Saint-Pierre, Martinique

In 1802, with the signing of the Treaty of Amiens, Martinique and St. Lucia were restored to France after six years of British control. Bertin, in May 1802, was named the first colonial prefect of the colony, arriving in Martinique on 18 Messidor X (July 7, 1802). Bertin shared control of the island with Rear Admiral Louis Thomas Villaret de Joyeuse as captain general and Le sieur Lefessier-Grandpré as grand judge. Bertin reported that the inhabitants of Martinique were happy to be once again under French rule, as he moved to establish hospitals and barracks and to refurbish military batteries and fortifications. Bertin also stressed the need to resume trade with Metropolitan France. In February 1803, Bertin ordered work to begin on the creation of the Jardin colonial des Plantes de Saint-Pierre.

In 1803, Britain declared war on France. Bertin sought support for the island from the United States by opening the ports of Martinique to neutral ships, but this proved ineffective in the face of the British maritime blockade.

In 1804, Bertin was replaced by Pierre-Clément de Laussat, who had lost his position as colonial prefect of Louisiana following the sale of the territory to the United States. Bertin retired to France and to private life.

== Legacy ==
Bertin Square in Saint-Pierre bears his name.
