= Ouachita County, Territory of Orleans =

Administrative subdivision, 1805–1807

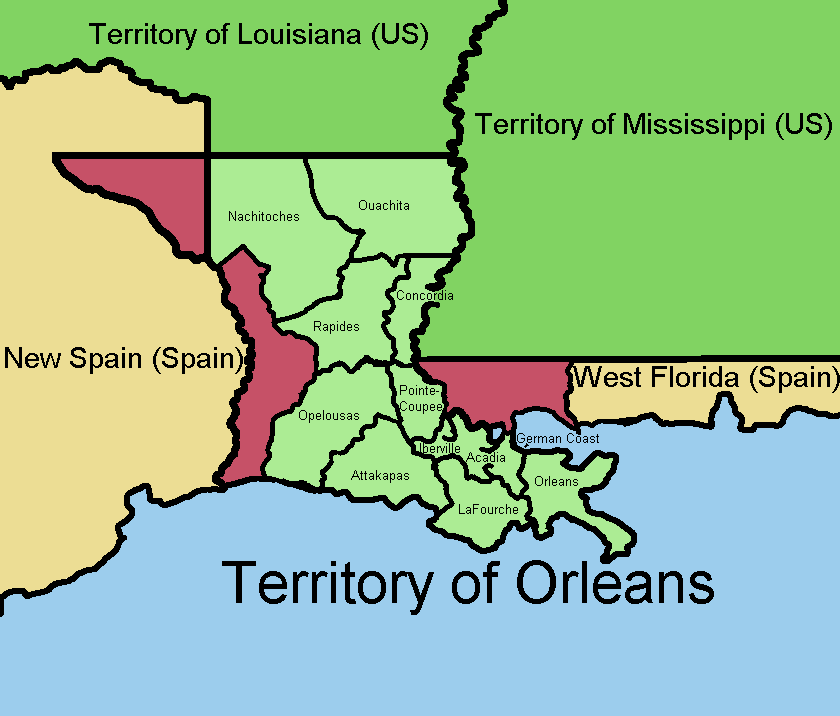
Map of Orleans Territory in 1804

Ouachita County was one of the original 12 subdivisions of the Territory of Orleans, United States. It was extant from 1805 to 1807, and encompassed much of northeastern Louisiana. The territorial counties were "extensive in area and the boundaries vaguely drawn, fixed...by describing them as composed of a certain parish or parishes. These latter ecclestical and military subdivisions were in effect during the French and Spanish dominations, their limits determined largely frem the sphere of influence of the various parish churches." The statutory description was "The county of Ouachita shall comprehend all that country commonly called and known by the name of the Ouachita Settlements." These settlements were presumably in the vicinity of the Ouachita River. Ouachita County encompassed Ouachita Parish, Jackson Parish, Union Parish, Morehouse Parish, Richland Parish, West Carroll Parish, and parts of Lincoln Parish, Caldwell Parish, and Franklin Parish. The county was named for the Ouachita people by way of Ouachita Post, a trading post established in 1783, renamed Fort Miro in 1785. The territorial council designated Fort Miro as the seat of justice for Ouachita County. In 1819 Fort Miro became Monroe, Louisiana.
