= William C. C. Claiborne =

American politician and military officer

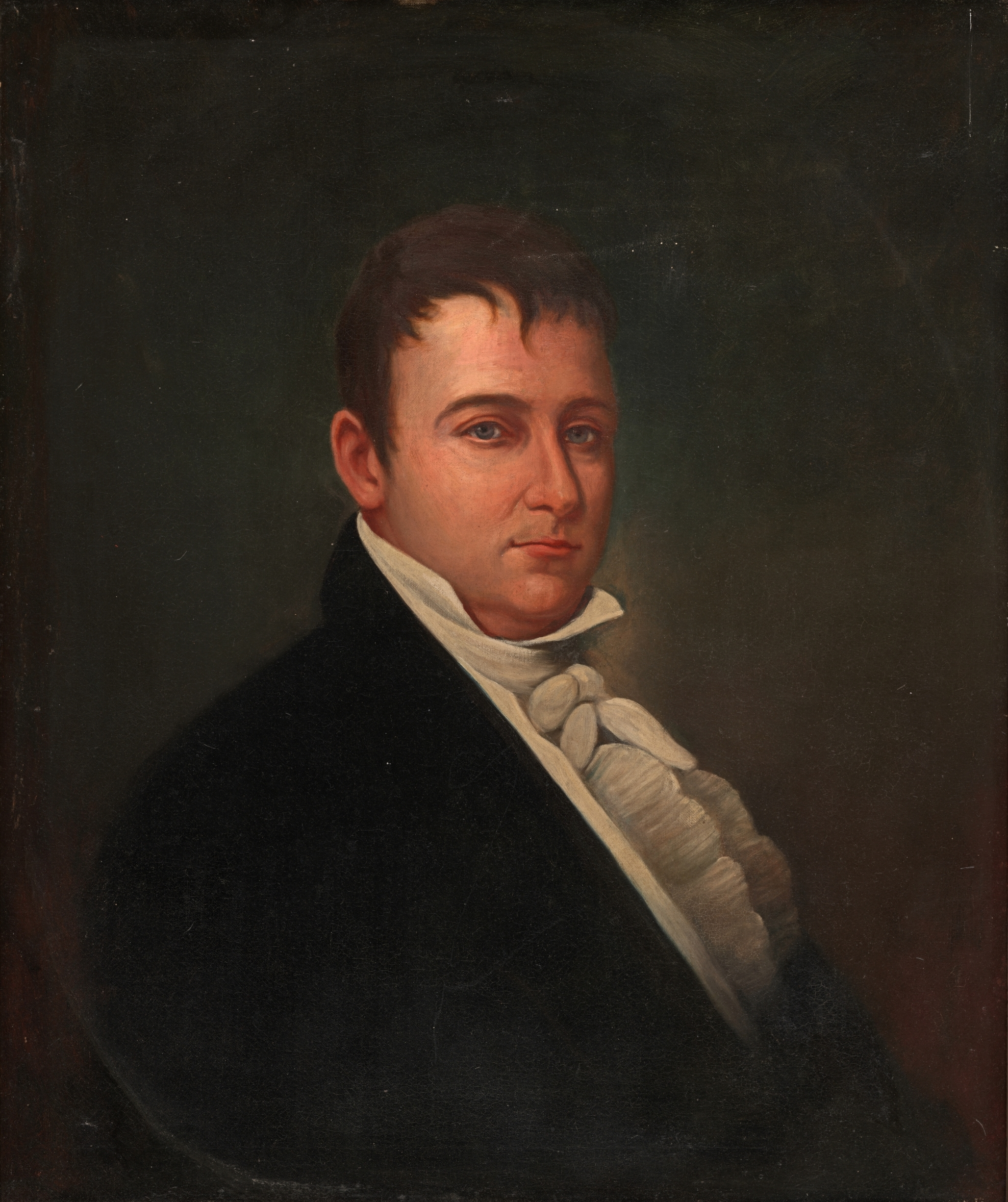
- Portrait by Andres Molinary, 1912

United States Senator from Louisiana
- In office March 4, 1817 – November 23, 1817
- Preceded by: James Brown
- Succeeded by: Henry Johnson

1st Governor of Louisiana
- In office April 30, 1812 – December 16, 1816
- Preceded by: Himself (as Governor of the Territory of Orleans)
- Succeeded by: Jacques Villeré

Governor of the Territory of Orleans
- In office December 20, 1803 – April 30, 1812
- President: Thomas Jefferson; James Madison
- Preceded by: Pierre Clément de Laussat (Under French control)
- Succeeded by: Himself (as Governor of Louisiana)

2nd Governor of Mississippi Territory
- In office May 25, 1801 – March 1, 1803
- President: Thomas Jefferson
- Preceded by: Winthrop Sargent
- Succeeded by: Robert Williams

Member of the U.S. House of Representatives from Tennessee's at-large district
- In office November 23, 1797 – March 3, 1801
- Preceded by: Andrew Jackson
- Succeeded by: William Dickson

Justice of the Tennessee Superior Court
- In office 1796–1797
- Appointed by: John Sevier
- Preceded by: Position established
- Succeeded by: Howell Tatum

Personal details
- Born: William Charles Cole Claiborne c. 1773–1775 Sussex County, Colony of Virginia, British America
- Died: November 23, 1817 (aged approximately 42) New Orleans, Louisiana, U.S.
- Party: Democratic-Republican
- Spouses: Eliza Wilson Lewis; Marie Clarisse Duralde; Cayetana Susana "Suzette" Bosque y Fangui
- Relatives: Ferdinand Claiborne (brother); Claiborne Pell (great-great-great-grandnephew)
- Education: College of William & Mary; Richmond Academy

Military service
- Allegiance: United States
- Branch/service: Louisiana Militia
- Years of service: 1815
- Battles/wars: Battle of New Orleans

William Charles Cole Claiborne (c. 1773–1775 – November 23, 1817) was an American politician and military officer who served as the first governor of Louisiana from April 30, 1812, to December 16, 1816. He was also possibly the youngest member of the United States Congress in the history of the United States, although reliable sources differ about his age. (Note: Governor Claiborne's birth date is unknown, but has been variously quoted as being August 13, 1773, or between November 23, 1773, and November 23, 1774, or in August 1775. His gravestone says he was 23 when he became a congressman (which definitely occurred on November 23, 1797).)

Claiborne supervised the transfer of Louisiana from French to U.S. control after the Louisiana Purchase of 1803, governing the "Territory of Orleans" from 1804 to 1812, the year in which Louisiana became a state. He won the first election for Louisiana's state Governor and served through 1816, for a total of thirteen years as Louisiana's executive administrator. New Orleans served as the capital city during both the colonial period and the early statehood period.

== Early life and career ==
Claiborne was born in Sussex County, Virginia, sometime between 1773 and 1775. His parents were Colonel William Claiborne and Mary Leigh Claiborne. He was a descendant of Colonel William Claiborne (1600–1677), an English pioneer who was born in Crayford, Kent, England, and settled in the Colony of Virginia.

Claiborne studied at the College of William and Mary, then Richmond Academy. At age 16 he moved to New York City, which was then the seat of U.S. Congress, where he worked as a clerk under John Beckley, the clerk of the United States House of Representatives. He moved to Philadelphia with the federal government. Claiborne then began to study law.

== Congressman from Tennessee ==
In 1794 Claiborne moved to Tennessee to start a law practice. Governor John Sevier appointed Claiborne to the Tennessee Supreme Court in 1796. In 1797, he resigned his appointment to the court to run for a seat in the U.S. House of Representatives. He won, and succeeded Andrew Jackson, though he was evidently not yet twenty-five years of age as required by the Constitution. Earlier in 1797, he described his age to George Washington in vague terms: "Born, Sir, at a period, when every American Breast palpitated for freedom, I became early attached to civil Liberty. ..."

Claiborne took his seat in the House on November 23, 1797. State records indicate that, when he took his seat, he was 24. Other sources suggest he was 22. His gravestone says he was 23.

Claiborne served in the House through 1801. The United States presidential election of 1800 was decided in the House of Representatives, due to a tie in the Electoral College, by which time Claiborne was over 25 years old. Claiborne supported Jefferson over Burr in the 1800 election and helped whip votes for him amongst the Tennessean delegation.

== Service in Mississippi Territory ==
Claiborne was appointed governor and superintendent of Indian affairs in the Mississippi Territory, from 1801 to 1803. Although he favored acquiring some land from the Choctaw and Chickasaw, Claiborne was generally sympathetic and conciliatory toward Indians. He worked long and patiently to iron out differences that arose, and to improve the material well-being of the Indians.

Claiborne was also partly successful in promoting the establishment of law and order in the region. From 1803 to 1804, he offered a two-thousand dollar reward to eliminate, once and for all, a gang of outlaws headed by the notorious Samuel Mason.

Though he looked out for his constituents, his positions on issues indicated a national rather than regional focus. Claiborne expressed the philosophy of the Democratic-Republican Party and helped that party defeat the Federalists.

When a smallpox epidemic broke out in the spring of 1802, Claiborne's actions resulted in the first recorded mass vaccination in the territory and saved the city of Natchez from the disease.

== Louisiana territorial period ==
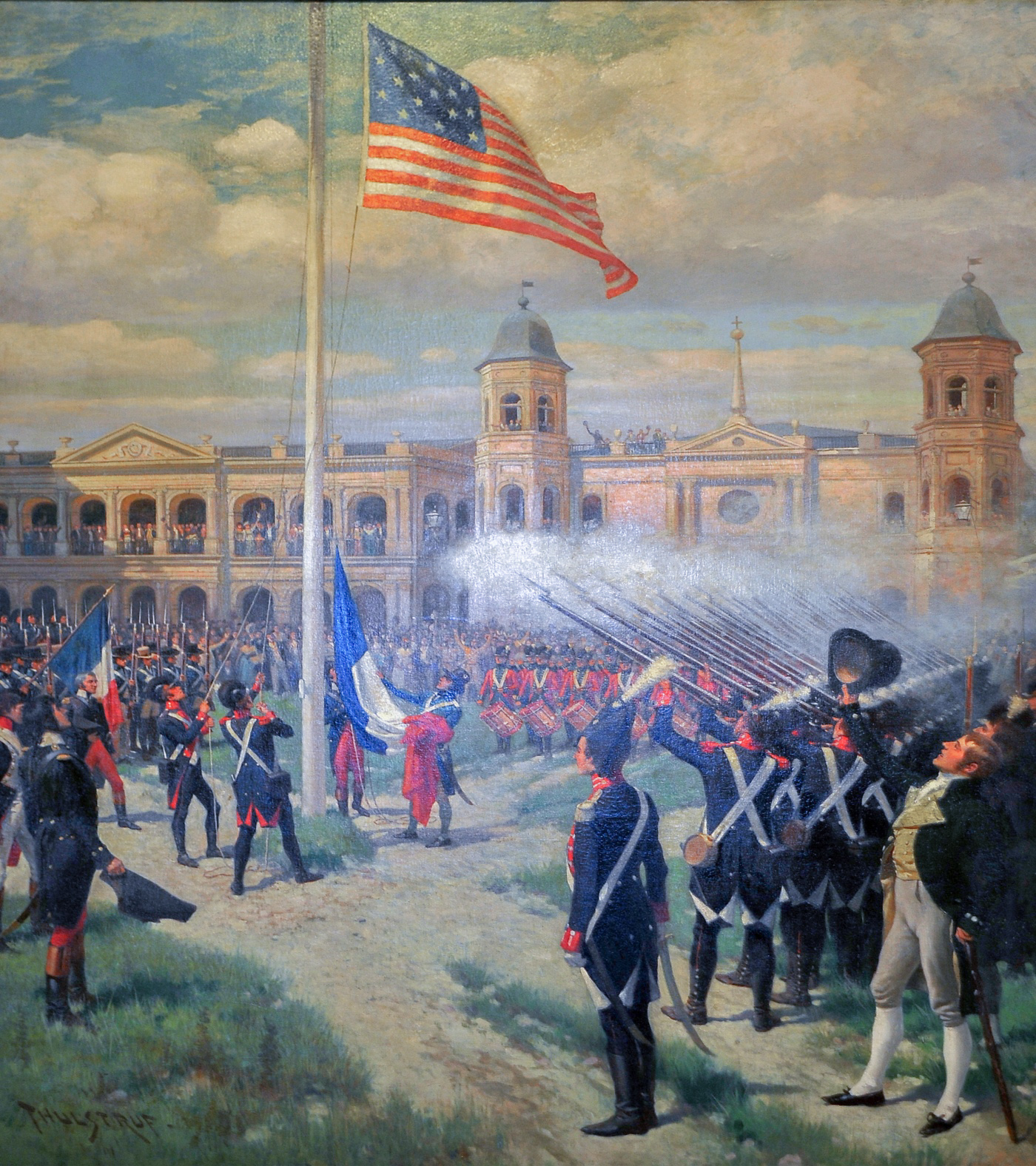
Painting of the handover ceremony in New Orleans on December 20, 1803. Claiborne is shown bottom right.

Claiborne moved to New Orleans and oversaw the transfer of Louisiana to U.S. control after the Louisiana Purchase on December 20, 1803. Local French and Spanish inhabitants saw it for what it was, a military occupation that they resented and quoted in their remonstrances and meetings that they were no more than conquered subjects who had not been consulted. He governed what would become the state of Louisiana, then termed the "Territory of Orleans", during its period as a United States territory from 1804 until 1812.

Relations with Louisiana's Créole population were initially rather strained: Claiborne was young, inexperienced, and unsure of himself, and at the time of his arrival spoke no French. His government was also opposed by an alliance of merchants, of whom Daniel Clark and Edward Livingston were the leading voices; Clark at one point called him "that creature, Claiborne" whom Jefferson had appointed "to degrade the American government in the eyes of the inhabitants of Louisiana..."

The white elite were initially alarmed when Claiborne retained the services of free people of color in the militia, who had served with considerable distinction during the preceding forty-year Spanish rule. Claiborne bestowed a ceremonial flag and 'colors' on the battalion, an act which would enmesh him in a duel three years later.

The duel was held in then-Spanish territory, near the current Houmas House plantation, with his arch-enemy Daniel Clark. On June 8, 1807, the Governor was shot through one thigh, with the bullet lodging in the other leg. Claiborne gradually gained the confidence of the French elite and oversaw the taking in of Francophone refugees from the Haitian Revolution.

An event which is now said to have been the largest slave rebellion in U.S. history, the 1811 German Coast Uprising, occurred while Claiborne was the territorial governor. However, the American government, over which he presided, had little participation in its suppression. The parish courts, dominated by wealthy planters, imposed quick death sentences of the enslaved who had survived their fight for freedom. U.S. military personnel arrived too late to capture the victims of enslavement or to prevent what amounted to their massacre at the hands of American militiamen or white planters who lived along the Mississippi River.

Claiborne himself wrote at least twice to parish officials to request that they refer cases to him for executive pardon or clemency, rather than accept the wholesale death sentences that were being handed out in Orleans Parish, as well as in St. Charles Parish and St. John the Baptist Parish. The only known beneficiaries of his pardon were two men named Theodore and Henry, but no records exist of Claiborne refusing any other pardon requests related to the rebellion.

After the Republic of West Florida won a short-lived period of independence (from Spain) in 1810, Claiborne annexed the area to the Orleans Territory on the orders of President James Madison, who determined to consider it as part of the Louisiana Purchase.

== After Louisiana statehood ==
Claiborne was the first elected governor after Louisiana became a U.S. state, winning the election of 1812 against Jacques Villeré, and serving from 1812 through 1816. On the eve of the War of 1812 he sent interpreter Simon Favre to the Choctaws to attempt to keep them out of the war. Claiborne raised militia companies and in 1814 negotiated the assistance of French pirate and slave trader Jean Lafitte in defending New Orleans from an expected British attack.

After the attack occurred in 1815, Claiborne wrote to Major-General John Lambert on March 25, informing him that two "distinguished citizens" of Louisiana, Michael Fortier and Chevalier de la Croix, had gone to his headquarters to Dauphin Island to retrieve fugitive slaves who had fled to the British Army and gained their freedom. Lambert's subordinate, John Power, replied to Claiborne on March 30, stating that "I should feel happy, in rendering any assistance to those Gentlemen, to enable them to execute the object of their mission, but agreeable to the determination of Major General Lambert... he did not feel himself authorized to resort to force, to oblige them [to return to their enslavers], as they threw themselves on his protection, which they were entitled to, having served with the British Army and which they did voluntarily and without compulsion."

After his term as governor, Claiborne was elected to the United States Senate, serving from March 4, 1817, until his death on November 23, 1817, which was 20 years to the day after his first day in Congress.

== Family life ==
Claiborne's first two wives, Eliza Wilson Lewis, daughter of William Terrell Lewis of Tennessee, and Marie Clarisse Duralde, daughter of Martin Duralde, both died of yellow fever, within five years of each other. Claiborne married Lewis in Tennessee when he lived there. The child of the first marriage, a little girl named Cornelia Tennessee Claiborne, died the same day as her mother. Clarissa Duralde Claiborne died in St. Martinsville.

In 1812, Governor Claiborne married a third time, to Cayetana Susana "Suzette" Bosque y Fangui, daughter of Don Bartólome Bosque, a Spanish colonial official. This marriage improved Claiborne's standing with white Louisiana Creoles. They had two children: Sophronia (or Sophronie) Louise Claiborne, who married Antoine James de Marigny, son of Bernard de Marigny and Ana Mathilde Morales, in 1835, and a son, Charles W. W. Claiborne.

== Death and legacy ==
Claiborne died on November 23, 1817. The Louisiana Courier attributed Claiborne's demise to a "liver ailment". Claiborne was buried at the St. Louis Cemetery Number 1, in New Orleans, then the most prestigious of the city's cemeteries. This was a controversial honor, as it is a Roman Catholic cemetery, while Claiborne was Protestant. He was later re-interred at the Metairie Cemetery in New Orleans.

Claiborne Parish, Louisiana, was named in his honor as were two U.S. counties: Claiborne County, Mississippi; and Claiborne County, Tennessee. The longest street in New Orleans was named in his honor: Claiborne Avenue.

The Supreme Court case Claiborne v. Police Jury established the three distinct governing structures of the U.S. in Louisiana. The decision was only made after Claiborne's death.

The World War II Camp Claiborne was named for him in 1939. This installation is still used today for training the Louisiana Army National Guard, particularly by the 256th Infantry Brigade for road marches and land navigation.

The Claiborne Building is located in downtown Baton Rouge and serves as an administrative center for the Louisiana state government.

In 1993, Claiborne was posthumously inducted into the Louisiana Political Museum and Hall of Fame in Winnfield. He was among the first thirteen inductees into the Hall of Fame.

== Descendants ==
William Claiborne was the great-great-great-grandfather of fashion designer Liz Claiborne. He was also the great-great-great-grandfather of Liz Claiborne's brother Carol Louis Fenner Claiborne, who served as an Assistant District Attorney of Orleans Parish, Louisiana, and an Assistant Solicitor General of the United States in Washington, D.C.; he then became a barrister in England.

Claiborne was related to numerous individuals who served in Congress over several generations. He was the brother of Nathaniel Herbert Claiborne, nephew of Thomas Claiborne, uncle of John Francis Hamtramck Claiborne, granduncle of James Robert Claiborne, great-great-great-granduncle of Lindy Boggs, and great-great-great-granduncle of Claiborne Pell.

== See also ==
- List of members of the United States Congress who died in office (1790–1899)

== Bibliography ==
- Abernethy, Thomas Perkins (1954). The Burr Conspiracy. New York: Oxford University Press. LCCN 54006907. OCLC 710644.
- Cowan, Walter G.; McGuire, Jack B. (2008). Louisiana governors: rulers, rascals, and reformers. Jackson: University Press of Mississippi. ISBN 978-1-934110-90-4.
- Hatfield, Joseph T. (1965). "Governor William Claiborne, Indians, and outlaws in frontier Mississippi, 1801–1803". Journal of Mississippi History. 27 (4): 323–350.
- Hatfield, Joseph Tennis (1965). "William C. C. Claiborne, congress, and republicanism, 1797–1804". Tennessee Historical Quarterly. 24 (2): 156–180.

U.S. House of Representatives
Preceded by Andrew Jackson	Member of the U.S. House of Representatives from Tennessee's at-large congressional district 1797–1801	Succeeded by William Dickson
Political offices
Preceded by Winthrop Sargent	Governor of Mississippi Territory; 1801–1805	Succeeded by Robert Williams
Preceded by Pierre Clément de Laussat	Governor of Territory of Orleans; 1803–1812	Succeeded by Became Governor of Louisiana
Preceded by none	Governor of Louisiana; 1812–1816	Succeeded by Jacques Villeré
U.S. Senate
Preceded by James Brown	U.S. senator (Class 2) from Louisiana; 1817; Served alongside: Eligius Fromentin	Succeeded by Henry Johnson
