= Natchitoches County, Territory of Orleans =

Administrative subdivision, 1805–1807

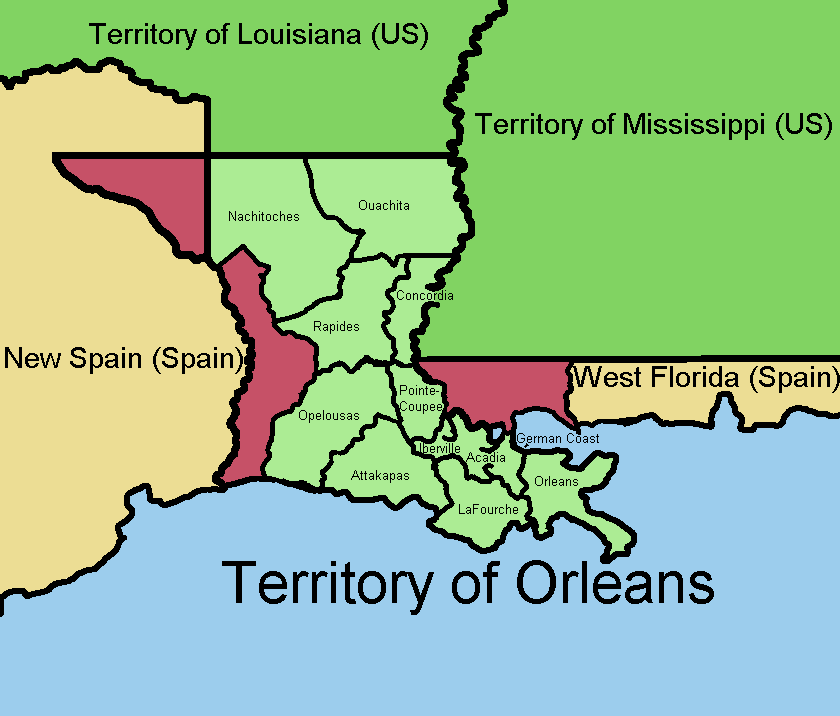
Map of Orleans Territory in 1804

Natchitoches County was one of the original 12 subdivisions of the Territory of Orleans, United States. It was extant from 1805 to 1807, and encompassed much of northwest Louisiana. The territorial counties were "extensive in area and the boundaries vaguely drawn, fixed...by describing them as composed of a certain parish or parishes. These latter ecclestical and military subdivisions were in effect during the French and Spanish dominations, their limits determined largely frem the sphere of influence of the various parish churches." Natchitoches County was created based on the limits of ecclesiastical Parish of St. Francis. Natchitoches County encompassed more than 10,000 square miles. The estimated population in 1807 was 3,000 people. Nine entire parishes and five parishes in part are derived from Natchitoches County. These are the current parishes of Caddo Parish, Bossier Parish, Bienville Parish, Claiborne Parish, Natchitoches Parish, Red River Parish, Webster Parish, DeSoto Parish, and Sabine Parish (whole), and Grant Parish, Jackson Parish, Lincoln Parish, Vernon Parish, and Winn Parish (part). Laws and regulations that referenced the county system were finally extinguished by the passage of the 1845 state constitution.
