= John William Smith (legal writer) =

English barrister and legal writer (1809–1845)

John William Smith (1809–1845) was an English barrister, known as a legal writer.

== Life ==
Born in Chapel Street, Belgrave Square, London, on 23 January 1809, he was eldest son of John Smith, who was appointed in 1830 paymaster of the forces in Ireland; his mother was a sister of George Connor, master in chancery in Ireland. After a private school in Isleworth, he went in 1821 to Westminster School, where he was elected queen's scholar in 1823. He entered in 1826 Trinity College, Dublin, where he obtained a scholarship in 1829, and was awarded the gold medal in classics in the following year.

Smith joined on 20 June 1827 the Inner Temple, where, after practising for some years as a special pleader, he was called to the bar on 3 May 1834. From 1837 to 1843 he was lecturer at the Law Institution, and in 1840 was appointed to a revising barristership. He practised for a time on the Oxford circuit and at the Hereford and Gloucester sessions, but later only in London.

Smith died of consumption on 17 December 1845. He was buried in Kensal Green cemetery, and a tablet was placed to his memory in the Temple Church.

== Works ==
Smith's major works were:

- Compendium of Mercantile Law, 1834, London, with a third edition in its author's lifetime, later editions by George Morley Dowdeswell in 1848, 1855, 1871, and 1877, and by John Macdonell and George Humphreys in 1890;
- An Elementary View of the Proceedings in an Action at Law 1836, London, with a 14th edition by William Decimus Inglett Foulkes in 1884; and
- A Selection of Leading Cases on Various Branches of the Law, in 1837–1840, London, 2 vols., with a tenth edition, edited by Thomas Willes Chitty, John Herbert Williams, and Herbert Chitty, in 1896.

Other works by Smith were:

- The Law of Contracts: in a course of lectures delivered at the Law Institution, notes and appendix by Jelinger Cookson Symons, London, 1847, with subsequent editions by John George Malcolm in 1855 and 1868, and by Vincent Thomas Thompson in 1874 and 1885;
- The Law of Landlord and Tenant: being a Course of Lectures delivered at the Law Institution; with notes and additions by Frederic Philip Maude, London, 1855, 1866, 1882.

== Notes ==
Attribution

- This article incorporates text from a publication now in the public domain: Lee, Sidney, ed. (1898). "Smith, John William". Dictionary of National Biography. Vol. 53. London: Smith, Elder & Co.
