= Opelousas County, Territory of Orleans =

Administrative subdivision, 1805–1807

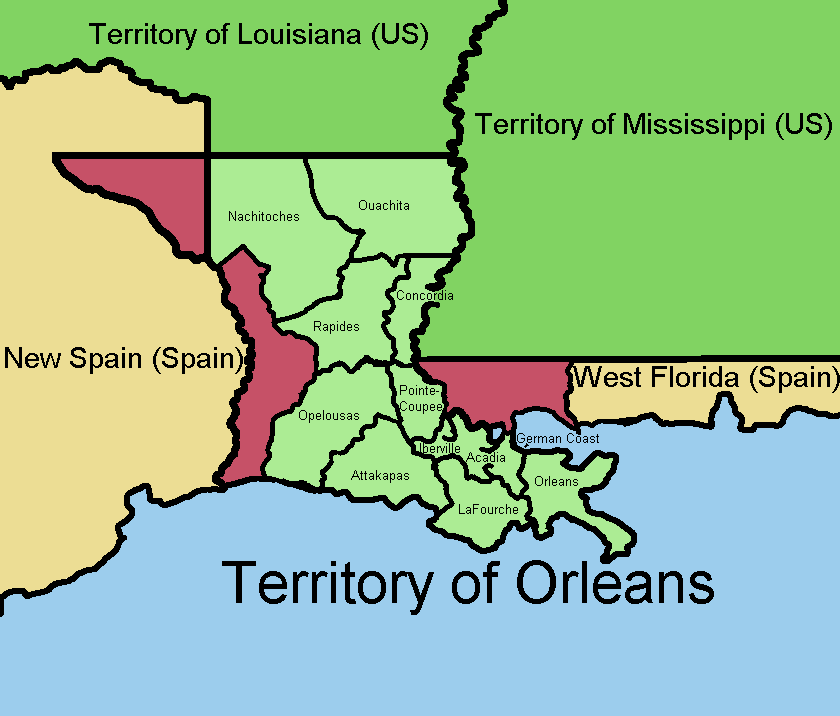
Map of Orleans Territory in 1804

Opelousas County was one of the original 12 subdivisions of the Territory of Orleans, United States. It was extant from 1805 to 1807. The territorial counties were "extensive in area and the boundaries vaguely drawn, fixed...by describing them as composed of a certain parish or parishes. These latter ecclesiastical and military subdivisions were in effect during the French and Spanish dominations, their limits determined largely from the sphere of influence of the various parish churches." Opelousas County encompassed what is now Beauregard Parish, Allen Parish, Evangeline Parish, St. Landry Parish, Acadia Parish, Jefferson Davis Parish, Calcasieu Parish, most of Cameron Parish, and "possibly the southernmost tip of Vernon." The seat of justice was called Opelousas Church. The county was named for the Opelousa people. The Spanish established a trading post at Opelousas in 1765. The U.S. marshal counted 5,048 residents of the Opelousas district in 1809.
