= Territory of Orleans =

1804–1812 U.S. organized incorporated territory

Territory of Orleans Territoire d'Orléans
- Organized incorporated territory of the United States
- 1804–1812
- Flag of the United States Seal

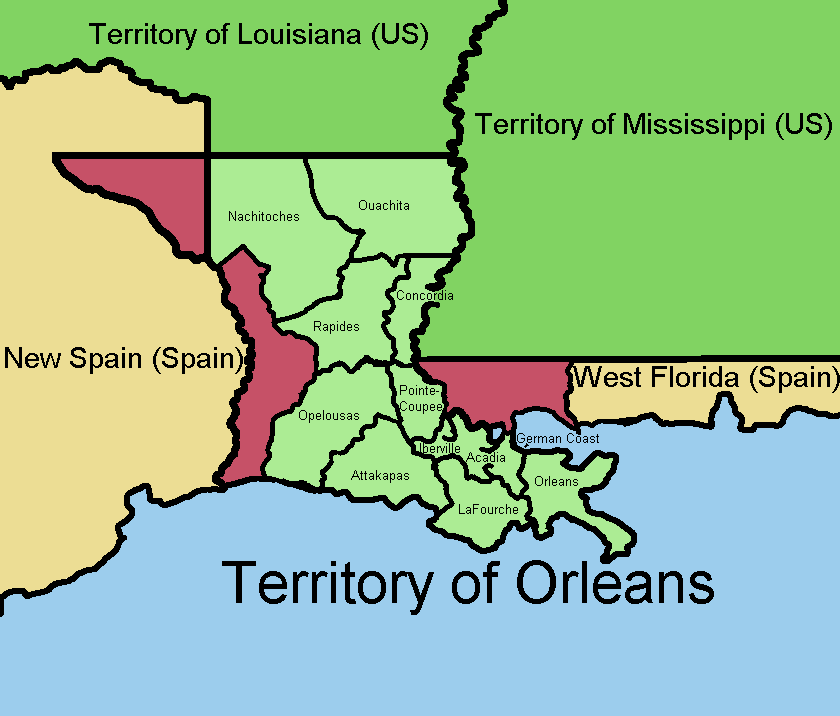
- The Territory of Orleans in 1804, with adjacent territories held by Spain, shown in red.
- Government
  - Type: Organized incorporated territory
- Governor
  - 1804–1812: William C. C. Claiborne
- Secretary
  - 1804–1807: James Brown
  - 1807–1811: Thomas Bolling Robertson
- History
  - Established: October 1 1804
  - Statehood: April 30 1812
Preceded by	Succeeded by
Louisiana Purchase; Republic of West Florida	Louisiana
- Today part of: United States

The Territory of Orleans or Orleans Territory was an organized incorporated territory of the United States that existed from October 1, 1804, until April 30, 1812, when it was admitted to the Union as the State of Louisiana.

== History ==
In 1804, all of the Louisiana Purchase south of the 33rd parallel became the Orleans Territory, and the remainder became the District of Louisiana. (The District of Louisiana was later renamed the Louisiana Territory; still later, when the Orleans Territory became the State of Louisiana, the Louisiana Territory was renamed the Missouri Territory.)

The Organic Act of 1804, passed on March 26 for October 1 implementation, also created the United States District Court for the District of Orleans—the only time Congress has ever provided a territory with a United States district court equal in its authority and jurisdiction to those of the states. Congress also established the Superior Court for the Territory of Orleans, whose three judges were the top territorial court.

On April 10, 1805, the Territorial Legislature organized 12 counties (starting from the southeast corner moving west and north): Orleans, Lafourche, German Coast, Acadia, Iberville, Attakapas, Pointe Coupée, Opelousas, Rapides, Concordia, Natchitoches, and Ouachita. These were replaced in 1807 by 19 civil parishes.

The area that later became the Florida Parishes on the east side of the Mississippi River was not included in Orleans Territory at this time, as it was in the Spanish territory of West Florida. This area was formally appended to the territory on April 14, 1812, after having been annexed forcibly by the U.S. in 1810, although Spain did not formally relinquish any of West Florida until 1821. The western boundary with Spanish Texas was not fully defined until the Adams–Onís Treaty was negotiated in 1819. A strip of land known as the Sabine Free State just east of the Sabine River served as a neutral ground buffer area from about 1807 until the treaty took effect after ratification in 1821.

The Orleans Territory was the site of the largest slave revolt in American history, the 1811 German Coast Uprising.

In the 1810 United States census, 20 parishes in the Orleans Territory reported the following population counts:

Rank	County	Population
1	Orleans	24,552
2	St. Martin	7,369
3	St. Landry	5,048
4	Pointe Coupee	4,539
5	St. James	3,955
6	St. Charles	3,291
7	St. John the Baptist	2,990
8	Concordia	2,895
9	Natchitoches	2,870
10	Iberville	2,679
11	Assumption	2,472
12	Ascension	2,219
13	Rapides	2,200
14	Lafourche	1,995
15	Plaquemines	1,549
16	West Baton Rouge	1,463
17	Avoyelles	1,209
18	Catahoula	1,164
19	Ouachita	1,077
20	St. Bernard	1,020
	Orleans Territory	76,556

Barthelemy Lafon's 1806 Map of the Territory of Orleans. Commissioned by Governor William C. C. Claiborne and the legislature.

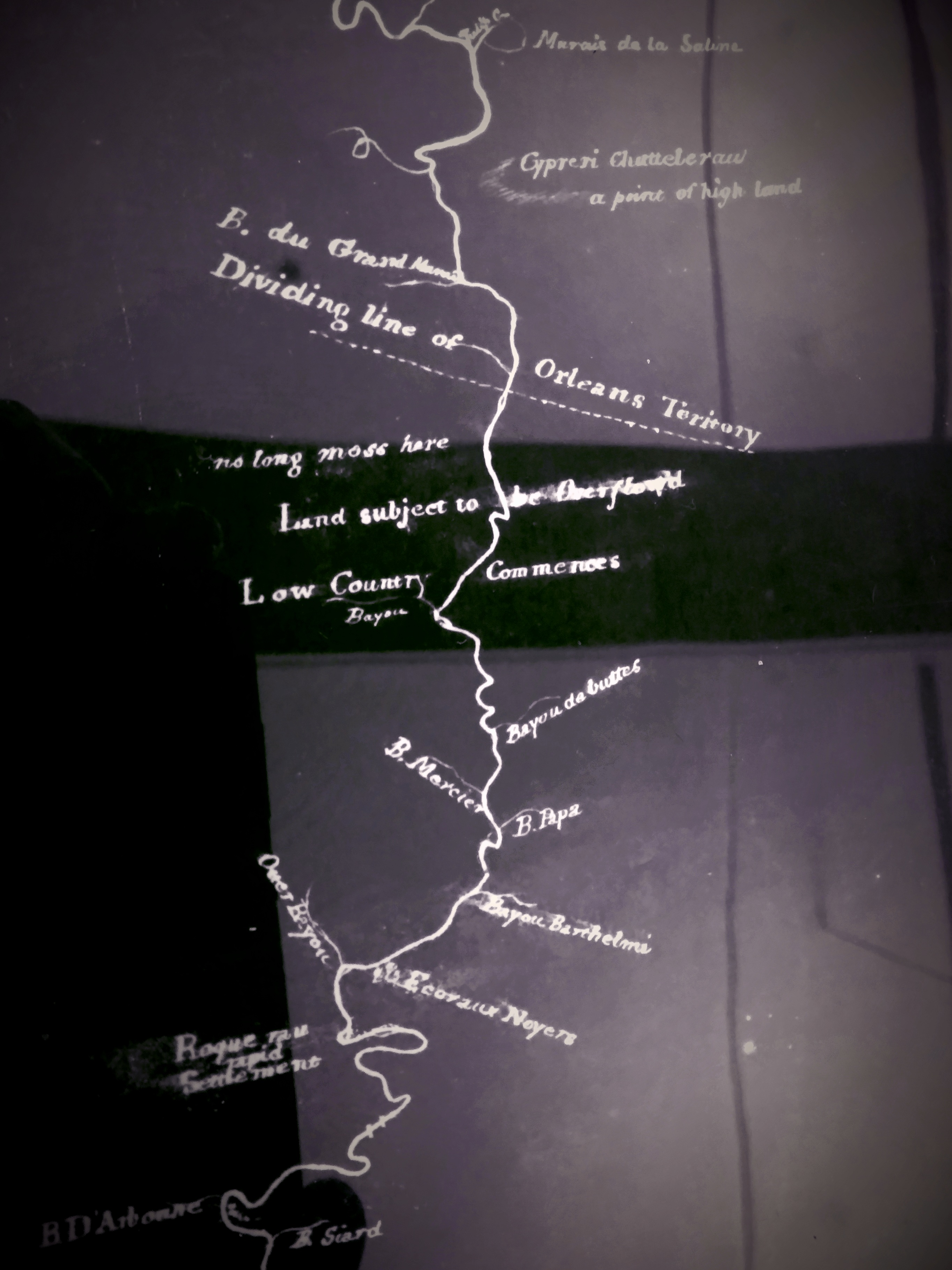
Colonial map showing territorial border on the Ouachita RIver

== Leaders and representatives ==
William C. C. Claiborne was appointed Governor of the Orleans Territory; he held this position throughout the territorial period. Later he became the first Governor of the state of Louisiana.

There were two Territorial Secretaries, James Brown (1804–1807) and Thomas B. Robertson (1807–1811). Daniel Clark became the first Territorial Delegate to the U.S. Congress, in December 1806. Judge Dominic Augustin Hall was the U.S. District Judge of the Territory.

Judges of the Superior Court were John Bartow Prevost (1804–1808), Ephraim Kirby (1804) (died en route to New Orleans), Peter Stephen Du Ponceau (1804) (declined President Thomas Jefferson's appointment), William Sprigg (1805–1807), George Mathews, Jr. (1805–1813), Joshua Lewis (1807–1813), and Francois Xavier Martin (1810–1813).

=== Legislative council ===
At its first meeting on December 3, 1804, the territory's Legislative Council consisted of Julien de Lallande Poydras, William Kenner, John Watkins, William Wikoff, Benjamin Morgan, Eugene Dorcier, and George Pollock.

James Mather, Flood, and "Dorcierre" (?) were members in 1805.

In June 1805, Jefferson appointed John Sibley of Natchitoches to the legislative council of the Territory of Orleans. Nominations sent to the President in November 1805 were "Messrs Bellechasse, Gurley, M'Carty, Derbigny, Destreham, Sauve, Boulgny, Villan, Evan Jones and Donnemour."

Jefferson appointed Joseph Deville Degoutin Bellechasse, Jean Noël Destréhan, John Baptiste McCarty, and Pierre Sauvé to the legislative council in 1806. Destréhan was president of the legislative council of the Territory of Orleans, in 1806 and 1811.

== See also ==
- Historic regions of the United States
- Territorial evolution of the United States
- History of Louisiana
- List of parishes in Louisiana
- Florida Parishes
- Spanish West Florida
- Orleans Territory's at-large congressional district
- United States District Court for the District of Orleans
- United States District Court for the District of Louisiana
- United States Attorney for the District of Louisiana
