= List of French Americans =

Franco-American Flag

French Americans are U.S. citizens or nationals of French descent and heritage. The majority of Franco-American families did not arrive directly from France, but rather settled French territories in the New World (primarily in the 17th and 18th centuries) before moving or being forced to move to the United States later on (see Quebec diaspora and Great Upheaval). Also, the largest French territory in North America was sold to the U.S., absorbing their French citizens (see Louisiana Purchase). About 26 million U.S. residents are of French descent, and about 1.5 million of them speak the French language at home. Being isolated, mixed with different cultures, or ignored, the French-Americans developed particular cultures that reflect varying degrees of adaptation of their environments. This gave birth to streams of French-Americans like the Acadians, the Cajuns (an Anglicization of the autonym Cadien, from the French word for Acadian, Acadien), Louisiana Créoles and many others. In the 2020 United States census, French Americans (25.8 million or 7.4% of the population) were the 4th most common ancestral group, followed by German Americans (45 million), Irish Americans (38.5 million) and Mexican Americans (37.4 million) but ahead of English Americans (25.5 million), based on the self-reporting ancestry data from the U.S. Census Bureau.

The following is a list of notable French Americans by occupation, including both original immigrants who obtained American citizenship and their American descendants.

To be included in this list, the person must have a Wikipedia article showing they are French American or must have references showing they are French American and are notable.

== Business ==
=== General ===
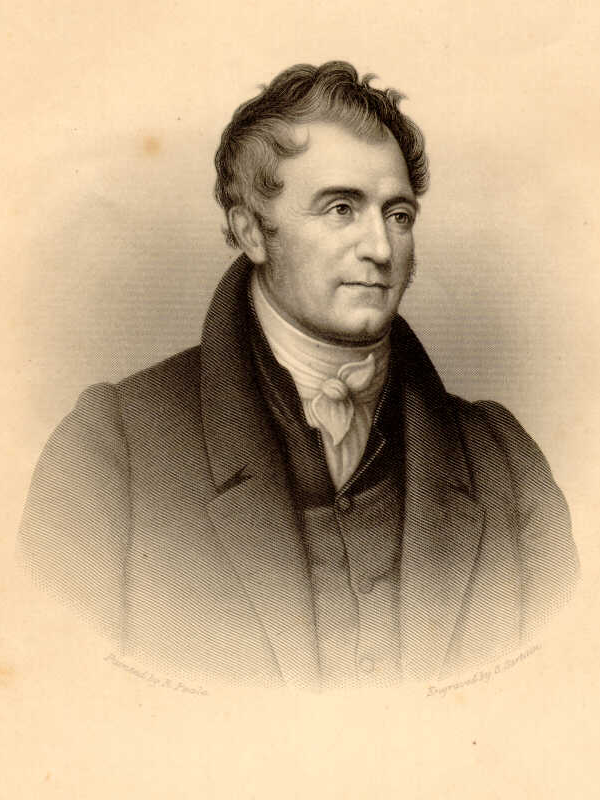
Éleuthère Irénée du Pont de Nemours (1771–1834)

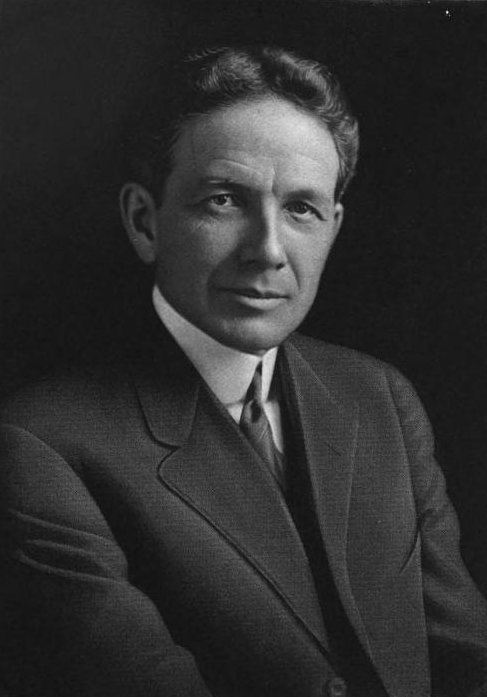
William C. Durant (1861–1947) co-founder of General Motors and Chevrolet

- John Vernou Bouvier III (1891–1957), Wall Street stockbroker and father of U.S. First Lady Jacqueline Lee Bouvier
- Roger E Brunschwig, highly decorated world wars hero, activist, businessman
- Warren Buffett, of French Huguenot ancestry and among the top wealthiest men in the world
- François Castaing, 27-year veteran automotive executive
- Clyde Cessna, aircraft designer
- Louis Chevrolet, co-founder with William C. Durant of the Chevrolet Motor Car Company
- Yvon Chouinard, rock climber, environmentalist and outdoor industry businessman
- John de Menil, President of Schlumberger North America
- Georges Doriot (1899–1988), one of the first American venture capitalists
- William C. Durant, founder of General Motors; a co-founder with Louis Chevrolet of the Chevrolet Motor Car Company
- Jean-Louis Gassée (born 1944), founder of Be Inc.
- King Camp Gillette, founder of the Gillette Safety Razor Company
- Stephen Girard (1750–1831), banker and tradesman from Bordeaux
- Augustus D. Juilliard (1836–1919), businessman whose philanthropy built the renowned conservatory of dance, music, and theater in New York City that bears his name
- Philippe Kahn (born 1952), mathematician and entrepreneur known as the inventor of the camera phone, a pioneer in the wireless industry, and the founder of Borland
- Joseph LaCombe, retired American businessman and owner of Joseph LaCombe Stable Inc., a thoroughbred horse racing stable
- Thomas W. Lamont, banker
- Robert LeFevre (1911–1986), libertarian businessman and radio personality
- Gérard Louis-Dreyfus, French businessman and father of actress Julia Louis-Dreyfus
- Étienne Lucier, fur trader from French Prairie
- André Meyer (1898–1979), Wall Street investment banker
- Pierre Omidyar (born 1967), French-born Iranian, founder of eBay
- Frank Perdue & Associates, the Perdue family is of French Huguenot ancestry, and can be traced back to Anjou, France; the family created the Perdue Chicken Company
- Ross Perot (1930–2019), entrepreneur, philanthropist and candidate for the Presidency of the United States
- Alexis F. du Pont (1879–1948), member of the American du Pont family and helped found St. Andrew's School in Middletown, Delaware; father of Alexis Felix du Pont Jr.; founder of U.S. Airways
- Alexis Felix du Pont Jr. (1905–1996), American aviation pioneer, soldier, philanthropist, and a member of the prominent Du Pont family
- Eleuthère Irénée du Pont de Nemours, patriarch of a successful American business family; chemical industry
- Richard Chichester du Pont (1911–1943), American businessman and an aviation and glider pioneer
- Baroness Micaela Almonester de Pontalba, New Orleans-born businesswoman; French mother
- Felix Rohatyn (1928–2019), businessman, investment banker, served in public service as an ambassador
- Jacques Telesphore Roman (1800–1848), businessman
- Paul Tulane (1801–1887), businessman and philanthropist, Tulane University named in his honor

== Entertainment ==
=== Actors ===
- Renée Adorée, French-born American actress
- Jessica Alba, actress; mother is of partial French-Canadian ancestry
- Cliff Arquette (1905–1974), American actor was of part French-Canadian descent, and his family's surname was originally "Arcouet"
- Lewis Arquette (1935–2001), American actor, was of French-Canadian descent
- Patricia Arquette (born 1968), American actress, is of French-Canadian descent
- Alexis Arquette (July 28, 1969 – September 11, 2016), was an American actress, cabaret performer, underground cartoonist, and activist. Alexis was of French-Canadian descent.
- René Auberjonois (1940–2019), Tony Award-winner, American character actor (and grandson of the painter), best known for his early 1980s role as Clayton Endicott III on the television show Benson and his role as Odo on Star Trek: Deep Space Nine
- Tina Aumont, California-born actress; father was an immigrant from France
- Elle Burstyn, American actress with French ancestry.
- Alec Baldwin, actor, one of the four brothers; mother had part French-Canadian ancestry
- Daniel Baldwin, actor, one of the four brothers; mother had part French-Canadian ancestry
- Stephen Baldwin, actor, one of the four brothers; mother had part French-Canadian ancestry
- William Baldwin, actor, one of the four brothers; mother had part French-Canadian ancestry
- Lucille Ball (1911–1989), actress; mother was of partial French heritage
- Adrienne Barbeau (born 1945), 1980s B-movie actress; father was of part French-Canadian ancestry
- Jean-Marc Barr, French-American film actor and director
- Earl W. Bascom (1906–1995), cowboy actor and artist, descendant of Nicolas Martiau
- Hugh Beaumont, actor with large filmography; father was of French ancestry
- Kimberly Beck, actress with mother of French descent; daughter of actress Cindy Robbins
- Pierre Bellocq, French-American artist and horse racing cartoonist
- Melissa Benoist, American actress, of partial French descent through paternal great-grandfather
- Marcheline Bertrand, actress of half French-Canadian ancestry, mother of actress Angelina Jolie
- Jessica Biel (born 1982), American actress with distant French roots
- JB Blanc (born 1969), actor; father of French descent
- Cate Blanchett, actress
- Joan Blondell (1906–1979), American actress; father Eddie was of French descent
- Caprice Bourret (born 1971), French American actress and model
- Charles Boyer (1899–1978), film actor, immigrant from France
- Elizabeth Bracco, actress with French and Italian ancestry
- Lorraine Bracco, actress with French and Italian ancestry
- Jules Brulatour, pioneering figure in American silent cinema
- Ellen Bry, actress best known for her work on the NBC medical drama series St. Elsewhere
- Mary Cadorette, former American actress
- Dove Cameron, American actor of French descent
- Dean Cain, American actor, of part French descent
- Trishelle Cannatella (born 1979), American actress, model; of Cajun ancestry

Leslie Caron on the set of Gigi (1958)

- Leslie Caron (born 1931), film actress and dancer; born in France
- Charisma Carpenter (born 1970), American actress, of part French descent
- Jim Carrey, Canadian-American actor; father was of French-Canadian ancestry and family surname was Anglicization of Carré
- Lacey Chabert (born 1982), actress, father of mostly Cajun/French descent
- Loan Chabanol (born 1982), actress
- Pauline Chalamet (born 1992), American-French actress; born to a French father, of French and British descent, and an American Jewish mother, holds both passports
- Timothée Chalamet (born 1995), American-French actor; born to a French father, of French and British descent, and an American Jewish mother, holds both passports
- Lon Chaney Sr., silent film actor, of part French descent
- Lon Chaney Jr., actor and son of Lon Chaney Sr.; of part French descent
- David Charvet, French-born American actor and singer, husband of Brooke Burke
- Lilyan Chauvin, French-born actress
- Robert Clary (1926–2022), actor, published author, and lecturer
- Claudette Colbert, French-American actress
- Bud Cort (born 1948), actor, of partial French descent
- Phil Cousineau, author, screenwriter, and documentary filmmaker
- Daniel Craig, actor, naturalized American citizen
- Joan Crawford, actress, her father was of partial French Huguenot ancestry
- Marcia Cross, actress with French-Canadian heritage
- Billy Crudup, actor
- Willem Dafoe, actor, father was of partial French descent
- Lili Damita, French-born actress
- Bette Davis, film actress, born in Lowell, Massachusetts; father was of English descent and mother was of French-Canadian descent
- Robert De Niro, one of the most acclaimed actors of all time; two-time Academy Award winner; mother had small amount of French ancestry
- Ellen DeGeneres, actress, talk-show host; father was of part French descent
- Anthony Delon, actor, son of French actors Alain Delon and Nathalie Delon
- Johnny Depp (born 1963), actor; He is descended from a French Huguenot immigrant (Pierre Dieppe, who settled in Virginia around 1700)
- Lily-Rose Depp, French-born American actress and model. She is the daughter of American actor, producer, and musician Johnny Depp and French singer, actress, and model Vanessa Paradis.

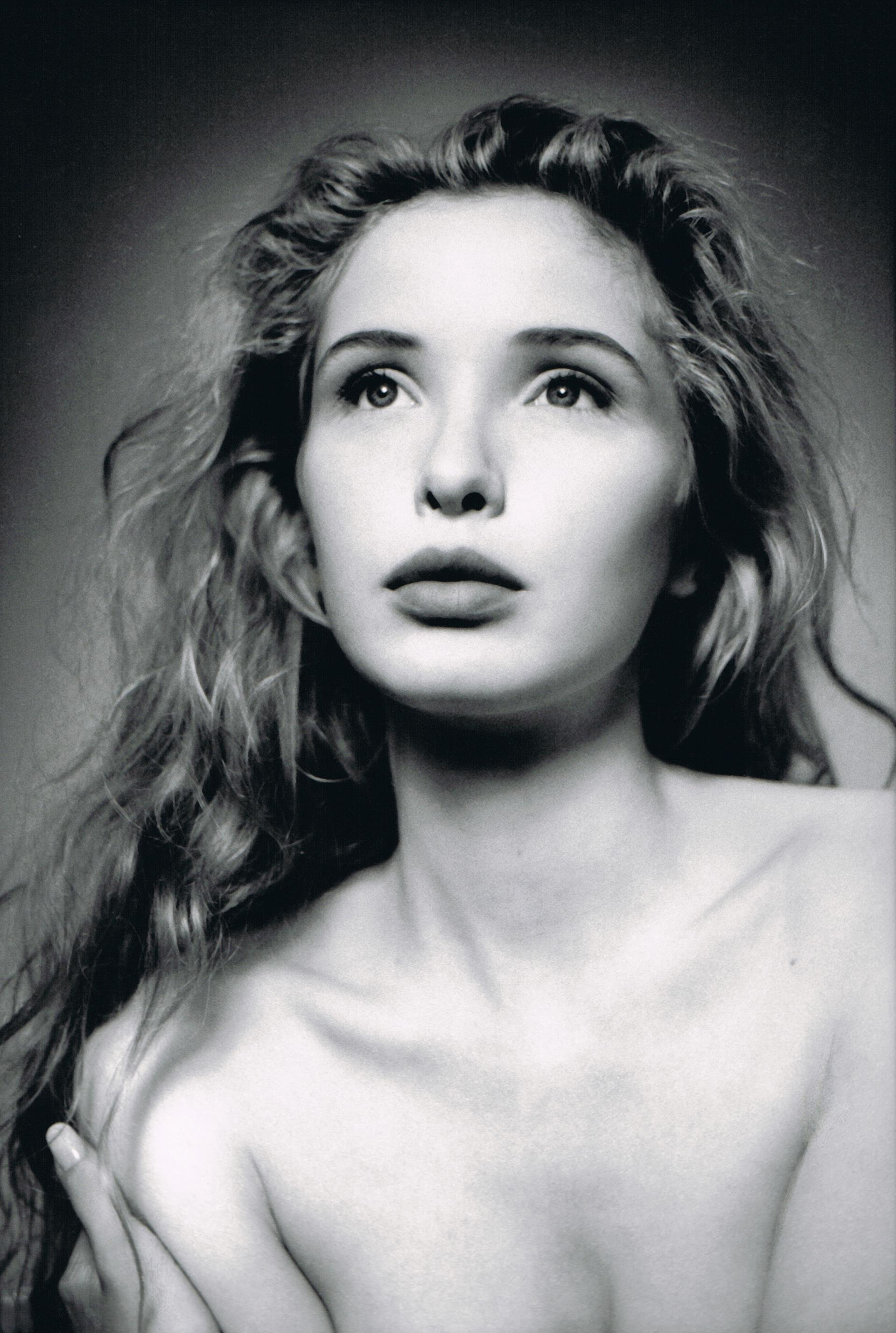
The French-American actress Julie Delpy

- Julie Delpy (born 1969), actress, immigrant from France
- Emilie de Ravin (born 1981), Australian actress; naturalized American citizen
- Emily Deschanel, actress and daughter of cinematographer Caleb Deschanel, of partial French descent
- Zooey Deschanel, actress and daughter of cinematographer Caleb Deschanel, of partial French descent
- Arielle Dombasle (born 1958), singer and actress working primarily in the cinema of France
- Brad Dourif (born 1950), actor; paternal grandparents were immigrants from France
- Fiona Dourif (born 1981), American actress of part French ancestry, daughter of Brad Dourif
- Joanne Dru, actress; sister of actor and TV game show host Peter Marshall
- Val Dufour, actor, known for his role of Andre Lazar on The Edge of Night
- Nicole duFresne (1977–2005), playwright and actress
- Josh Duhamel (born 1972), actor, father is of partial French-Canadian ancestry
- Tiffany Dupont (born 1981), French American actress known for the film One Night With the King
- Shelley Duvall, American actress with distant French Huguenot heritage
- James Duval, actor, known for his roles as Frank in Donnie Darko and as Singh in Go; both parents are of partial French ancestry
- Clea DuVall, actress, father is of part French descent
- Robert Duvall, of distant French paternal ancestry
- Mireille Enos, actress; mother is French
- Jon Favreau, actor, director, screenwriter, voice artist, and comedian; father is of partial French-Canadian ancestry
- Robert Florey (1900–1979), actor, director, screenwriter
- Jorja Fox, actress, CSI: Crime Scene Investigation, mother is of French-Canadian and Belgian ancestry
- Brendan Fraser, actor
- Elle Fanning, American actress with French ancestry through her father's lineage
- Dakota Fanning, American actress with French ancestry through her father's lineage
- Àstrid Bergès-Frisbey, actress, mother is French-American
- Eva Le Gallienne, actress
- Brittny Gastineau (born 1983), American actress, and model; daughter of former NFL player Mark Gastineau and Lisa Gastineau
- Richard Gautier, actor
- Judy Garland, American actress and singer with French Huguenot ancestry.
- Cam Gigandet, actor, known for Never Back Down and Red Sky
- Robert Goulet (1933–2007), actor/singer
- Adrian Grenier, actor, mother has small amount of French ancestry
- Alice Guy-Blaché, pioneer filmmaker; first female director in the motion picture industry
- Anne Hathaway (born 1982), film actress; of mostly Irish and French ancestry
- Marc Diraison, voice actor
- Frances Heflin, actress, of partial French descent
- Van Heflin, actor, of partial French descent
- Gillian Jacobs, actress, known for her role on the NBC sitcom Community; of part French descent
- Celina Jade, actress, singer and martial artist
- Angelina Jolie (born 1975), actress, maternal grandfather was of French-Canadian descent
- Victoria Justice (born 1993), father is of part French descent
- Anya Taylor-Joy, actress whose maternal grandmother had a small amount of French ancestry.
- Minka Kelly (born 1980), American actress; known for role of Lyla Garrity on NBC's Friday Night Lights; biological father is aerosmith guitarist Rick Dufay, born in France, to American parents
- Rod La Rocque (1898–1969), film actor of French Canadian descent
- Shia LaBeouf (born 1986), actor, Cajun (French) father
- Art LaFleur (born 1943) American actor
- Christopher Lambert (born 1957), actor
- Cynthia Lamontagne, actress
- Dorothy Lamour (1914–1996), film actress, mother was of French Cajun ancestry
- John Larroquette, Emmy Award-winning film and television actor
- Brie Larson, (born 1989), film actress. Larson was born Brianne Sidonie Desaulniers. Her father is French Canadian, and in her childhood, Larson spoke French as her first language
- Eva LaRue (born 1966), actress best known for portraying Natalia Boa Vista on CSI: Miami; was on a soap opera for many years; ovarian cancer spokesperson
- Lash LaRue (1917–1996), actor
- Taylor Lautner (born 1992), actor, martial artist, of partial French descent
- Sabrina Le Beauf (born 1958), actress, French Creole, known for playing Sandra on The Cosby Show
- Eva Le Gallienne, well-known actress, producer, and director, during the first half of the 20th century
- Christian LeBlanc (born 1958), two-time Emmy Award-winning American actor
- Matt LeBlanc (born 1967), American actor, known as Joey Tribbiani on the show Friends; father was of French-Canadian heritage
- Adam LeFevre, actor, Taxi, of partial French descent
- Rachelle Lefevre, actress
- Harry Lennix, actor, Suspect Zero, 24, of partial French descent
- Jennifer LeRoy, adult film actress, actress and model
- Hal LeSueur, actor and brother of Joan Crawford; father is of partial French Huguenot ancestry
- Jared Leto, actor and frontman of Thirty Seconds to Mars, of French Cajun descent
- Matthew Libatíque is an American cinematographer who is known for his work on the films Pi (1998), Requiem for a Dream (2000), The Fountain (2006), Black Swan (2010).
- Claudine Longet, actress
- Jon Lormer, French-American actor
- Julia Louis-Dreyfus, daughter of French-Jewish businessman Gérard Louis-Dreyfus; known for her roles in the series Seinfeld and The New Adventures of Old Christine
- Vincent Minnelli, American stage and film director of maternal French-Canadian ancestry.
- Liza Minnelli, American actress, singer and dancer who both parents had French roots.
- Brook Mahealani Lee (born 1971), Eurasian model; former miss Hawaii, Miss USA, and Miss Universe 1997
- J. P. Manoux, Marquant actor, Phil of the Future, Angel, Smallville, Scrubs, Charmed, and Crossing Jordan
- Romy Mars (born 2006), actress and singer, French father
- Peter Marshall, best known as the original host of the TV game show Hollywood Squares; brother of actress Joanne Dru
- Mike Marshall, French-American actor; son of director William Marshall and half-brother of Tonie Marshall
- Tonie Marshall, French-American actress; son of director William Marshall and half-sister of Mike Marshall
- Rosita Marstini (1887–1948), dancer, stage personality, silent and sound film actress from Nancy, France
- Charles Martinet (born 1955), actor best known as the voice of Mario and Luigi in the Super Mario franchise.
- The Marx Brothers, whose father Sam Marx was born in France
- Rose McGowan (born 1973), Italian-born American actress best known for Charmed; of Irish paternal and French maternal ancestry
- Jaeden Martell, American actor of whose father is of French-Canadian ancestry.
- Meiling Melançon, actress
- Christopher Meloni (born 1961), American actor, mother is of French-Canadian heritage
- Adolphe Menjou (1890–1963), film actor, especially from the 1920s–1940s
- Jesse Metcalfe (born 1978), played John Rowland in Desperate Housewives; father is of partial French ancestry
- Wentworth Miller, mother has distant French ancestry
- Yvette Mimieux (1942–2022), American actress, of French and Mexican ancestry
- Nathan Fillion (born 1970), actor
- Madison Pettis (born 1998), American actress of French, Irish, Italian, and African-American ancestry
- Victor Pépin, circus master with the Circus of Pépin and Breschard
- Pauley Perrette, (born 1969), American actress
- Ryan Phillippe, of part French descent
- Ryan Potter, of part French descent
- Tyrone Power, actor, mother was of part French-Canadian descent, father was of partial French Huguenot ancestry
- Dennis William Quaid (born 1954), American film actor. Quaid has English, Irish, Scots-Irish, and Cajun (French) ancestry.
- Randy Randall Rudy Quaid (born 1950), American film actor. Quaid has English, Irish, Scots-Irish, and Cajun (French) ancestry.
- Lili Reinhart, actress
- Maggie Quigley (born 1979), Euro-Asian American actress and former fashion model, known for Mission Impossible III and Balls of Fury, father of part French-Canadian descent
- Cindy Robbins, actress of French descent; mother of actress Kimberly Beck
- Mickey Rourke, actor, mother of part French descent
- Brandon Routh, actor, of partial French heritage
- Carol Roux, actress
- Kiele Sanchez (born 1977), actress, mother of French descent
- Reni Santoni, film, television and voice actor
- Chloë Sevigny (born 1974), actress with French-Canadian ancestry
- April Scott (born 1977), American actress of French, Native American, and Spanish ancestry
- Francesca Scorsese (born 1999), actress, filmmaker & TikTok creator, Italian-American father (Martin Scorsese) and French mother
- Michael Sinterniklaas (born 1972), voice actor
- Tom Sizemore (born 1961), actor of maternal part French ancestry
- Leelee Sobieski (born 1983), film actress, father is an immigrant from France, who is of Polish and Swiss descent
- Shannyn Sossamon (born 1978), born in Honolulu, Hawaii, of French, Hawaiian, Dutch, English, Irish, Filipino, and German descent
- Sonya Smith (born 1972), Spanish-American telenovela actress of Venezuelan, German, Finnish and French descent
- Sylvester Stallone (born 1946), actor and film producer; mother is half French; maternal grandmother is from Brest
- Stéphanie Szostak (born 1975), actress
- Charlize Theron (born 1975), born in South Africa, now an American actress of French Huguenot, Dutch, and German descent
- Justin Theroux, actor, screenwriter and director, father is of French-Canadian and Italian heritage
- Franchot Tone, Hollywood actor, of partial French descent
- Beth Toussaint, actress, Red Eye
- Luis van Rooten (1906–1973), actor
- Michael Vartan, actor, born in France (not of French descent)
- Hervé Villechaize (1943–1973), French American actor born to Paris and immigrant from France
- Mari Blanchard, actress
- Tessa Gräfin von Walderdorff (born 1994), actress of French, Swiss, Dutch and German ancestry
- Rudolph Valentino (1895–1926), his mother was French from Lure, Haute-Saône

=== Artists ===
- Barzolff (born 1973), visual artist and graphic designer
- Earl W. Bascom (1906–1995), artist and sculptor, "Cowboy of Cowboy Artists"
- Tom Bergeron (born 1955), TV host, Emmy Award-nominated
- Louise Bourgeois (1911–2010), abstract expressionist artist; born in Paris, married an American
- Brooke Burke (born 1971), television personality and model, known for hosting Wild On! (1999–2002); of French, Irish, Jewish, and Portuguese ancestry
- Isabelle Collin Dufresne (1935–2014), artist, author, and former colleague of Andy Warhol
- Katie Couric, TV personality, most of her ancestry is French
- Ellen DeGeneres, TV personality, father is of French Cajun ancestry
- Leah Dizon (born 1986), actress, model, and singer; of French, and Asian (Filipino-Chinese) ancestry
- Angela Dufresne (born 1969), artist based in Brooklyn, New York
- Edgar de Evia, Mexican-born photographer and son of French pianist Pauline Joutard
- Sean Flynn, photographer whose death in Cambodia remains a mystery; son of French actress and singer Lili Damita and actor Errol Flynn
- Melody Gardot (born 1985), jazz singer from Philadelphia
- Peter Grain (1785–1857), painter, architect and panoramist
- Van Heflin (1908–1971), actor
- Gaston Lachaise (1882–1935), sculptor
- Danielle Lacourse (born 1986), French American Miss USA runner-up
- Bonnie Jill Laflin (born 1976), model and actress; of French descent
- Don LaFontaine (1940–2008), voiceover artist; recorded more than 5,000 film trailers and hundreds of thousands of television advertisements, network promotions, and video game trailers; his nicknames include "Thunder Throat" and "The Voice of God"
- Allie LaForce (born 1988), beauty queen from Vermilion, Ohio; Miss Teen USA 2005
- Ali Landry, actress, model
- Brook Mahealani Lee (born 1971), Miss USA and Miss Hawaii USA prior to winning the Miss Universe 1997 pageant; of mixed Korean, Portuguese, French, Hawaiian and Chinese ancestry
- Paul de Longpré (1855–1911), flower painter
- Madonna (born 1958), international singer; mother is of French-Canadian descent
- Josie Maran (born 1978), American supermodel of partial French ancestry
- Michelle Maylene (born 1987), pornographic actress; of Filipino, and French ancestry
- Maria McBane (born 1946), model and actress, Playboy Playmate of the Month May 1965
- Linda Moon, Playboy magazine Playmate of the Month October 1966
- Frederic Remington (1861–1909), western artist and sculptor
- Bernard Renaud (Renot) (born 1935), French-born American artist, sculptor, illustrator and author
- René Ricard (1946–2014), artist, poet, and philosopher
- Jasmin St. Claire (born 1974), pornographic actress; of Italian, Russian, and French ancestry
- Patrick Tatopoulos, Greek-French-American production designer
- Tila Tequila (born 1981), model, singer, and actress; of 3/4 Vietnamese, and 1/4 French ancestry
- Stephanie Trudeau (born 1986), French American Miss Montana winner
- Henry Villierme (1928–2013), French American artist (Bay Area Figurative Movement)

=== Musicians ===
- Phil Anselmo (born 1968), heavy metal musician
- Sara Bareilles (born 1979), American singer, her first single was "Love Song"
- David Benoit (born 1953), American jazz pianist
- Jello Biafra, singer for 1970s punk band Dead Kennedys
- Brent Bourgeois (born 1958), American rock musician, songwriter, and producer
- Wellman Braud, jazz string bass player
- Colbie Caillat, young singer and daughter of Ken Caillat
- Lucien Cailliet (1897–1985), American composer, conductor, arranger and clarinetist
- Marcel Chagnon, American country music singer-songwriter
- Cher, American singer, actress
- Kurt Cobain (1967–1994), lead singer, guitarist, and songwriter for band Nirvana; His ancestry was mostly of French and Irish origin
- Amie Comeaux (1976–1997), country singer
- Alice Cooper (born 1947), American singer; has French Huguenot ancestry
- Joe Dassin (1938–1980), French-speaking musician
- Paul De Lisle, singer, Smash Mouth
- Gavin DeGraw (born 1977), American singer of French descent
- Marianne Dissard (born 1969), French-born singer
- Laurie Berkner (born 1969), American musician
- Leah Dizon (born 1986), singer, model, actress of French and Asian ancestry
- Michael Doucet, singer-songwriter and founder of the Cajun band BeauSoleil
- Joe Duplantier (born 1976), singer and guitarist of the metal band Gojira
- Mario Duplantier (born 1981), drummer of the metal band Gojira
- G-Eazy, (born 1989), rapper
- Mary Gauthier, folk singer-songwriter
- George Girard, musician
- Ice-T, rapper, actor and vocalist of the heavy metal band Body Count of African-American and Creole descent
- Dan Ingram, Top 40 disc jockey with a forty-year career on radio stations such as WABC and WCBS-FM in New York City
- JoJo (born 1990), American pop/R&B singer-songwriter and actress
- Beyoncé (born 1981), American R&B singer-songwriter and actress; a French Creole of French and African-American and Native American descent
- Solange Knowles (born 1986), R&B singer; a French Creole of French and African-American and Native American descent
- Ray Lamontagne (born 1974), American Grammy Award-winning singer-songwriter
- Amel Larrieux (born 1973), American R&B/soul singer-songwriter
- Calixa Lavallée, lived in Rhode Island and served in the American Civil War as lieutenant
- Mylon LeFevre, gospel singer and writer
- Victoria Legrand, French-born lead singer and keyboardist of the dream pop duo Beach House
- Iry LeJeune, one of the best-selling and most popular musicians during 1940
- Braeden Lemasters, lead guitarist and singer of Wallows, of French Huguenot descent
- Paz Lenchantin, bass player part of the band A Perfect Circle
- J. B. Lenoir, Chicago blues guitarist, singer-songwriter
- Charles Martin Loeffler, French-born composer
- Claudine Longet, singer, actress and dancer
- Madonna (born 1958), French-Canadian on her mother's side of the family
- W. A. Mathieu, composer, pianist, choir director, music teacher, and author
- Pierre Monteux (1875–1964), orchestra conductor
- Dave Mustaine, founder of heavy metal Band Megadeth; former member of Metallica
- Madeleine Peyroux, American jazz singer-songwriter, and guitarist
- Lily Pons (1898–1976), coloratura soprano
- Elvis Presley, American singer-songwriter and actor, often referred to as "the King of Rock and Roll", or simply "the King"
- Marc Rebillet, American musician, French father
- Zachary Richard,(born 1950), American Cajun musician, singer-songwriter and poet
- Shandi Sinnamon, singer-songwriter
- Izzy Stradlin, American rock musician
- DeVante Swing, member of R&B group Jodeci
- Edgard Varèse, French-born composer
- Jaci Velasquez (born 1979), American singer, Grammy Award, and Dove Award winner of Mexican, French, and Spanish ancestry
- Maïa Vidal (b. 1988), singer-songwriter
- Rufus Wainwright (born 1973), singer-songwriter
- Clarence White (1944–1973), musician for The Byrds
- Lolo Zouaï (born 1995) singer-songwriter

=== Other entertainers ===
- Charlotte d'Amboise (born 1964), American actress and dancer and daughter of Jacques d'Amboise
- Christopher d'Amboise (born 1960), American dancer, choreographer, writer, and theatre director, son of Jacques d'Amboise
- Jacques d'Amboise (1934–2021), American ballet dancer and choreographer
- Kevyn Aucoin (1962–2002), make-up artist and photographer
- Anthony Bourdain, author and the "Chef-at-Large" of Brasserie Les Halles, based in New York City with locations in Miami, Florida, and Washington, D.C. and host of the Travel Channel's culinary and cultural adventure program Anthony Bourdain: No Reservations
- Joseph C. Brun (1907–1998), French-born American cinematographer
- Damien Chazelle, American director and screenwriter
- Steven Crowder, French-Canadian and American conservative political commentator on YouTube
- Vance DeGeneres, performer, producer, and writer of several television shows
- Caleb Deschanel, American cinematographer
- Lynsey DuFour, soap opera writer
- Virginie Amélie Avegno Gautreau (1859–1915), artist's model, also known as "Madame X"
- Paul Germain, animation screenwriter and producer
- Michael Goudeau, juggler and ex-circus clown; writer and executive producer for the Showtime series Bullshit!
- Marianne Gravatte, Playboy playmate
- Lloyd Jacquet, comic-book innovator
- Susan La Flesche Picotte (1865–1915), physician; 3/4 Native, 1/4 French
- Fredric Lean award-winning documentary filmmaker
- Ted LeFevre, theatrical set designer
- Monique Lhuillier (born 1971), fashion designer
- Yolanda "Tongolele" Montes, exotic dancer and actress of the Cinema of Mexico
- Don Ohlmeyer, TV producer and president of NBC West Coast; father was of French Huguenot descent
- Jacqueline Kennedy Onassis (1929–1994), First Lady and wife of the late John F. Kennedy; maiden name is Bouvier and she is usually referred to by all three of her surnames together; father was of French descent
- Jean-Paul Poulain (died 2007), Maine Franco-American cabaret recording artist
- Carrie Prejean, model and beauty pageant contestant; father is of French descent
- Lee Radziwill (Caroline Lee Bouvier), daughter of stockbroker John Vernou Bouvier III and sister of former first lady Jacqueline Onassis
- Michele Singer Reiner, film producer and photographer
- Camille Rowe, model; father is French
- Oliver Stone, director
- Cyril Takayama, Japanese/French American illusionist
- Susette LaFlesche Tibbles (1854–1903), sister of Susan La Flesche, writer, and artist
- Paul Verdier, stage director, actor, and playwright; had a number of guest parts on American television
- Jurgen Vsych, film director, screenwriter and author
- Ludwig Ahgren, online streamer and YouTuber; mother is French

== Explorers ==
- Étienne de Veniard, Sieur de Bourgmont (1679–1734), French explorer who made the first maps and documentation of the Missouri and Platte rivers
- Jean Baptiste Baudreau II, only man in American history executed by breaking wheel
- Jean-Baptiste Le Moyne de Bienville, founder of New Orleans, Biloxi, Natchez; co-founder of Mobile; served as colonial Governor of Louisiana (New France) for four terms, totaling 30 years
- Antoine de la Mothe Cadillac, founder of Detroit and one-time colonial governor of Louisiana (New France)
- Jean-Baptiste Charbonneau, born on the Lewis and Clark Expedition, depicted on a US$1 coin
- Toussaint Charbonneau, member of the Lewis and Clark Expedition
- François Chouteau (1797–1838), first white settlers of Kansas City, Missouri
- René Auguste Chouteau (1749–1829), trader with American Indians; founder of and influential figure in early St. Louis
- George Drouillard, translator on the Lewis and Clark Expedition
- Jean Baptiste Point du Sable (1745–1818), first permanent settler in Chicago, Illinois
- Marquis Duquesne (1700–1778), French Governor of New France; served from 1752 to 1755; best known for his role in the French and Indian War
- Peter Faneuil (1700–1743), colonial merchant and philanthropist who donated Faneuil Hall to Boston
- John C. Fremont (1813–1890), explorer with Kit Carson
- John Lewis Gervais, statesman and planter from South Carolina; formed delegate to the Continental Congress
- Joseph Gervais, pioneer settler and trapper in the Columbia District of the Hudson's Bay Company
- Antoine LeClaire, founder of Davenport, Iowa
- Pierre Antoine and Paul Mallet, early explorers and traders in the 18th century, in particular of the Santa Fe Trail
- Alexander McGillivray (1750–1793), leader of the Creek Indians
- Henry Davis Minot, railroad executive
- John Bevins Moisant (1868–1910), aviator
- Etienne Provost (1785–1850), explorer of Utah Valley
- Paul Revere (1734/1735–1818), silversmith and a patriot in the American Revolution
- Daniel Roberdeau (1727–1795), merchant
- Charles Rochon, founder of modern-day Mobile, commemorated with a plaque at Fort Conde
- Ceran St. Vrain, (1802–1870), trader in Missouri, Louisiana and New Mexico, including on the Santa Fe Trail
- Jedediah Smith, (1799–1831), discovered South Pass of the Rocky Mountains, first American to reach California by land
- William Sublette (1799–1845), explorer, fur trapper, mountain man
- Pedro Vial (1746–1814), French explorer who pioneered the Santa Fe Trail in the 18th century

== Law and politics ==
=== Governors and presidents ===
- Kelly Ayotte (born 1968), Governor of New Hampshire and former U.S. Senator
- Armand Beauvais (1783–1843), Governor of Louisiana
- Joe Biden (born 1942), American politician and the 46th president of the United States. Joseph Sr.'s parents, Mary Elizabeth (née Finnegan) and Joseph Robinette Biden Sr. (an oil businessman from Baltimore, Maryland) were of English, French, and Irish descent.
- Newton C. Blanchard (1849–1922), United States Representative, Senator, and Governor of Louisiana
- Kathleen Blanco, Governor of Louisiana
- Pierre Derbigny (1769–1829), Governor of Louisiana
- Jacques Dupre, Louisiana state representative, state senator and Governor of Louisiana
- William Pope Duval (1784–1854), first governor of Florida
- Edwin Edwards (1927–2021), Louisiana governor for four terms
- Paul Octave Hébert (1818–1880), Governor of Louisiana from 1853 to 1856 and a general in the Confederate Army
- John Jay, second governor of New York and first Chief Justice of the United States
- Robert M. La Follette, Governor of Wisconsin and progressive reformer
- Paul Laxalt, Governor of Nevada of French, Basque descent.
- Earl Long (1895–1960), three-time Democratic governor of Louisiana
- Huey Long (1893–1935), Louisiana Governor and a U.S. senator
- Alexander Mouton (1804–1885), United States Senator and Governor of Louisiana
- Thomas Nelson Jr. (1738–1789), signer of the Declaration of Independence, Governor of Virginia
- Pierre S. du Pont, IV, Governor of Delaware, U.S. Representative
- Aram J. Pothier, twice Governor of Rhode Island; of French Canadian descent
- Andre B. Roman (1795–1866), speaker of the Louisiana House of Representatives and twice elected Governor of Louisiana
- Franklin D. Roosevelt, 32nd president of the United States
- John Sevier, Governor of Tennessee until his death; house representative
- Henry S. Thibodaux (1769–1827), Governor of Louisiana; father-in-law of Alexander Hamilton
- Jacques Villeré (1761–1830), second governor of Louisiana
- George Washington (1732–1799), general of the American Revolutionary War, first American President, descendant of French-American Nicolas Martiau

=== Congressmen and senators ===
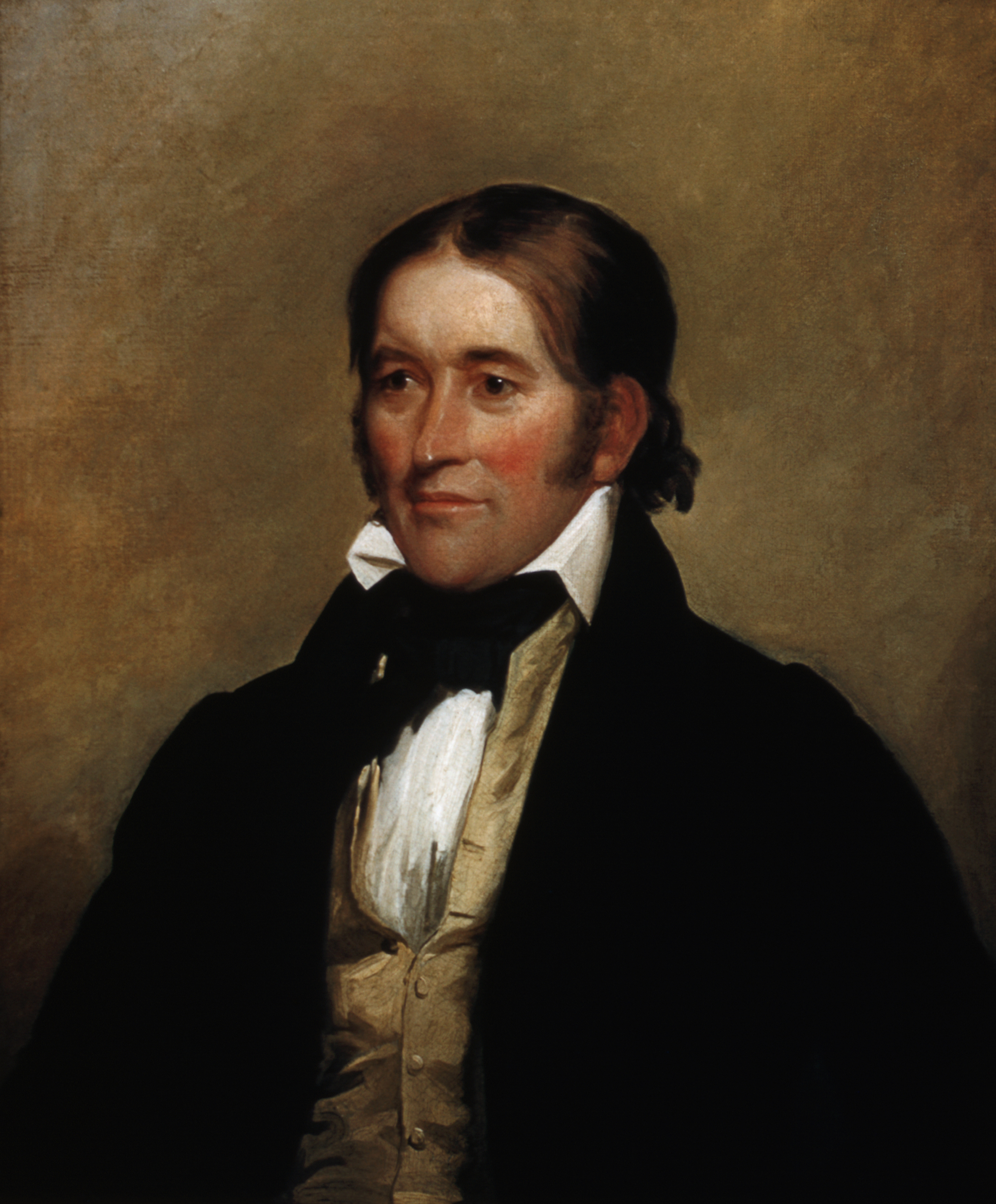
The folk hero Davy Crockett

- Les AuCoin, former Democratic congressman from Oregon
- Joe Biden, U.S. Senator and 46th President of the United States.
- John Bernard (1893–1983), former Farmer-Labor congressman from Minnesota
- Dominique Bouligny (1773–1833), U.S. Senator from Louisiana
- Carolyn Bourdeaux (born 1970) Democratic member of the United States House of Representatives from Georgia
- Elias Boudinot (1740–1821), early American statesman
- James Carville, French-American (Cajun) from Louisiana; outspoken Democrat and served in the Clinton administration; has been a political commentator for many years
- Hillary Clinton (born 1947), United States Secretary of State, former Democratic member of the United States Senate from New York; wife of William Jefferson Clinton; former first lady of the US
- Davy Crockett (1786–1836), folk hero, frontiersman, soldier and Congressman from Tennessee
- Tom DeLay (born 1947), former Republican member of the United States House of Representatives from Sugar Land, Texas, the former House Majority Leader, prominent member of the Republican Party
- Jean Noël Destréhan (1754–1823), U.S. Senator from Louisiana
- Eligius Fromentin (1767–1822), former U.S. Senator from Louisiana, Judge of the New Orleans Criminal Court, and U.S. Judge for West Florida
- Mike Gravel (1930–2021), Alaska former U.S. senator and candidate for the 2008 Democratic presidential nomination
- F. Edward Hebert, former Congressman, Chairman of Armed Services Committee
- Hiram Johnson, Governor of California, Congressman and U.S. Senator.
- Philip La Follette, Governor of Wisconsin two separate terms
- Robert M. La Follette Sr. (1855–1925), politician who served as a U.S. Congressman, the 20th Governor of Wisconsin from 1901 to 1906, and Senator from Wisconsin from 1905 to 1925 as a member of the Republican Party (Note: His great-grandfather was born in France; most of his other ancestry was English and American.)
- John Baptiste Charles Lucas, member of the U.S. House of Representatives from Pennsylvania
- Bernard de Marigny, early President of the Louisiana Senate
- Michael Michaud (born 1955), Democratic member of the U.S. House of Representatives from Millinocket, Maine, first elected in 2002
- Wilmer Mizell (1930–1999), Republican member of the U.S. House of Representatives for North Carolina, 1969–1975
- Lisa Murkowski (born 1957), Republican member of the U.S. Senate for Alaska, 2002- (her mother was of French-Irish descent)
- Gary Peters, senior Senator from Michigan (his mother was from France)
- Julien de Lallande Poydras (1740–1824), represented the Territory of Orleans in the U.S. House of Representatives, 1809–1811; a self-made businessman, philanthropist, poet, and educator
- Daniel Roberdeau (1727–1795), represented Pennsylvania from 1777 to 1779 in the Continental Congress and served as a brigadier general in the state militia during the Revolutionary War
- Gabriel Richard, former U.S. Congressman from the Michigan Territory
- Joseph Rosier, Senator
- Peter Sailly, former Democratic-Republican congressman from Pennsylvania
- Pierre Soulé, former U.S. Senator from Louisiana and U.S. Minister to Spain
- John Sevier (1745–1815), served four years as the only governor of the State of Franklin and twelve years as governor of Tennessee, and as a U.S. representative from Tennessee from 1811 until his death

=== Mayors ===
- Prudent Beaudry, mayor of Los Angeles
- Paul Bertus, mayor of New Orleans
- Etienne de Boré, first Mayor of New Orleans
- Paul Capdevielle, Confederate army officer, then mayor of New Orleans
- José M. Covarrubias, mayor of Santa Barbara, California
- Joey Durel, mayor of Lafayette, Louisiana
- Barry E. DuVal, mayor of Newport News, Virginia, 1990
- Peter Force (1790–1868), mayor of Washington, D.C., and archivist
- William Freret, thirteenth mayor of New Orleans
- Charles Genois (1793–1866), mayor of New Orleans
- Nicholas Girod, mayor of New Orleans
- John Brennan Hussey, former mayor of Shreveport, Louisiana
- Moon Landrieu, judge, former mayor of New Orleans, and former United States Secretary of Housing and Urban Development
- Damien Marchessault, mayor of Los Angeles
- Joseph Edgard Montegut, mayor of New Orleans
- James Pitot, second mayor of New Orleans
- Louis Philippe de Roffignac, mayor of New Orleans
- Jacques Roy, former mayor of Alexandria, Louisiana
- J. A. D. Rozier, mayor of New Orleans
- Charles Trudeau, fifth mayor of New Orleans
- Joanne Verger, mayor of Coos Bay, serving four terms; served in the Oregon House of Representatives from 2001 to 2004; elected to the Oregon State Senate in 2004

=== Other politicians ===
- Amy Coney Barrett, judge
- P. G. T. Beauregard, civil servant, politician, inventor, author, and the first prominent general for the Confederate States Army during the American Civil War
- Jonathan Blanchard, lawyer, statesman; delegate for New Hampshire to the Continental Congress in 1784
- Charles Joseph Bonaparte, Secretary of the Navy (1905) and US Attorney General (1906) in the Theodore Roosevelt Administration; founder of the Bureau of Investigation in 1908, renamed in 1935 the Federal Bureau of Investigation
- Merle Boucher, North Dakota House of Representatives, representing the 9th district since 1991
- Richard Boucher, Assistant Secretary of State for South and Central Asian Affairs
- James Carville, political consultant
- Eugene Debs, union organizer
- John Peter Didier, first State Treasurer of Missouri
- F.O. "Potch" Didier, Louisiana sheriff
- Cat Doucet, Louisiana sheriff
- George H. Durand, politician, jurist, and attorney
- Henry Durant, first President of the University of California
- Henry Fowle Durant, founder of Wellesley College
- Michael Raoul Duval, investment banker and lawyer; had Senior White House positions while serving under presidents Richard Nixon and Gerald Ford, where he rose to the position of Special Counsel to the President
- Christopher Emery (born 1957), author, Chief Enterprise Architect, and former White House Assistant Chief Usher
- Pierre (Peter) Charles L'Enfant, architect and urban planner
- John C. Frémont, military officer, explorer and the first candidate of the Republican Party for the office of President of the United States
- Edmond-Charles Genêt, French Ambassador to the U.S. during the American Revolution
- John Lewis Gervais, American statesman from South Carolina; delegate to the Continental Congress from 1782 to 1783
- Izabel Goulart (born 1984), Brazilian model of French and Italian ancestry; Victoria's Secret Angel
- John Grenier, one of the figures responsible for the rise of the Republican Party in Alabama
- Alexander Hamilton (1755–1804), American founding father, army officer, lawyer, politician, leading statesman, financier, and political theorist
- Russel L. Honoré, retired Lieutenant General who served as the 33rd commanding general of the U.S. First Army
- Caroline Kennedy (born 1957), daughter of Jacqueline Kennedy Onassis and John F. Kennedy
- John F. Kennedy Jr. (1960–1999), son of Jacqueline Kennedy Onassis and U.S. President John F. Kennedy
- Jacques Paul Klein, Under-Secretary-General United Nations, Ambassador, Major General, USAF
- Felix LaBauve, former Mississippi state senator
- Eric LaFleur, Louisiana House of Representatives
- Raymond "Lala" Lalonde, former Democratic Louisiana state representative
- Lyndon LaRouche, American political figure
- Dudley J. LeBlanc, popular member of Democratic Party
- Edwin O. LeGrand, one of the fifty-seven men who signed the Texas Declaration of Independence
- William Lenoir, American Revolutionary War officer and prominent statesman
- Nathaniel Macon, spokesman for the Old Republican faction of the Democratic-Republican Party
- Robert B. Macon, representative
- Alexander McGillivray, leader of the Creek Indians
- Joseph Merchant, state representative
- Ernest Nathan Morial, American political, legal, and civil rights leader
- Libby Pataki, former First Lady of New York
- Joel Roberts Poinsett, physician, botanist and American statesman
- Pierre S. du Pont, IV, member of the Republican Party; served three terms as U. S. Representative from Delaware and two terms as Governor of Delaware
- Hope Portocarrero (1929–1991), former First Lady of Nicaragua
- Julien de Lallande Poydras (1740–1824), French-American politician who served as Delegate from the Territory of Orleans to the United States House of Representatives
- Pierre Salinger, press secretary
- Pierre Soulé, U.S. politician and diplomat during the mid-19th century, best known for writing the Ostend Manifesto in 1854 as part of an attempt to annex Cuba to the United States
- Billy Tauzin, politician
- Joanne Verger, Mayor of Coos Bay, serving four terms; served in the Oregon House of Representatives from 2001 to 2004; elected to the Oregon State Senate in 2004
- David Vitter, politician

== Authors and writers ==
- Laura Albert, better known under her pen-name JT LeRoy, writer and publisher
- Louis L'Amour, author
- P. G. T. Beauregard, author, civil servant, politician, inventor, and the first prominent general for the Confederate States Army during the American Civil War
- Stephen Vincent Benét (1898–1943), author, poet, short story writer and novelist
- Bryan Bergeron, author
- Edd Cartier, pulp magazine illustrator
- Kate Chopin (1851–1904), author of short stories and novels
- Robert Cormier (1925–2000), American author with French-Canadian roots
- John Dufresne, American author
- Gilbert Chinard (1881–1972), author, historian
- Will Durant (1885–1981), philosopher, historian, and writer
- John Crittenden Duval, author
- Richard Le Gallienne, man of letters
- Robert Grenier, contemporary American poet who is often associated with the Language School
- Jack Kerouac (1922–1969), novelist, writer, poet, artist, and part of the Beat Generation
- Theodore de Laguna, American philosopher; early feminist
- Sidney Lanier (1842–1881), musician and poet (Note: His French ancestors immigrated to England in the 16th century.)
- Steve Lavigne, comic book illustrator best known for his lettering and coloring on Teenage Mutant Ninja Turtles comics
- Jonathan Littell, French-American author
- Grace Metalious (1924–1964), author, best known for Peyton Place
- Alice Miel, author
- Anaïs Nin (1903–1977), known for published diaries
- William Pène du Bois, author, illustrator and publicist
- Pierre Samuel du Pont de Nemours (1739–1817), writer, economist and statesman
- Annie Proulx
- Paul Theroux
- Henry David Thoreau (1817–1862), author of many articles and essays, development critic, naturalist, transcendentalist, pacifist, tax resister and philosopher; known for Walden, Civil Disobedience, Resistance to Civil Government
- George Steiner, born in Paris to Austrian-Jewish parents before moving to the US
- Gerald Vizenor (born 1934), poet, novelist and literary theorist;t known as an Anishinaabe writer, but he has written extensively about his French ancestors in texts such as Wordarrows (the narrative persona, "Clement Beaulieu", was the name of his uncle)
- Marguerite Yourcenar, author and first woman to be elected to the Académie Française, in 1980

== Education ==
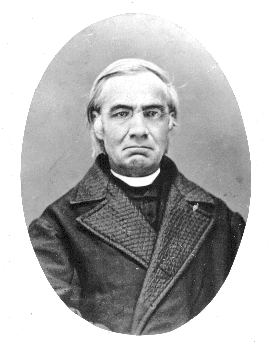
Edward Sorin (1814–1893), founder of the University of Notre Dame, Indiana

- Jonathan Blanchard, pastor, educator, social reformer, abolitionist and the first president of Wheaton College
- Claire-Marie Brisson, (1991-), Preceptor in French at Harvard University
- Laurent Clerc, teacher, "The Apostle of the Deaf in America", founder of the American School for the Deaf
- Thomas Hopkins Gallaudet (1787–1851), educator, co-founder of the American School for the Deaf.
- Richard Grenier, neoconservative cultural columnist for The Washington Times; film critic for Commentary and The New York Times
- Vladimir Lefebvre, mathematical psychologist at the University of California, Irvine
- Jean Mayer (1920–1993), French-American nutritionist; tenth president of Tufts University from 1976 to 1992
- Eric H. du Plessis, professor
- Edward Sorin (1814–1893), founder of the University of Notre Dame in Indiana and of St. Edward's University in Texas
- Fred G. Hoffherr (d. 1956), professor emeritus of French of Barnard College, led department
- Jeffrey Vitter (born 1955), Frederick L. Hovde Dean of Science at Purdue University

== Journalism ==
- Andrew Anglin (born 1984), editor of The Daily Stormer
- Abbie Boudreau (born 1978), CNN investigative journalist
- Jacqueline Bouvier Kennedy Onassis (1929–1994), former journalist and First Lady of the United States
- Ric Bucher, NBA analyst for ESPN
- Richard Grenier, neoconservative cultural columnist for The Washington Times; film critic for Commentary and The New York Times
- Ellen DeGeneres, television producer and host
- Adrian Nicole LeBlanc, journalist
- Connie LeGrand, television journalist; served in broadcasting in South Carolina; host of Speed News (now The Speed Report)
- John R. MacArthur, reporter for The Wall Street Journal (1977), the Washington Star (1978), The Bergen Record (1978–1979), Chicago Sun-Times (1979–1982); assistant foreign editor at United Press International (1982)
- Suzanne Malveaux, CNN correspondent, of French Creole ancestry
- E. Annie Proulx, American journalist and author
- Pierre Salinger (1925–2004), news correspondent and presidential press secretary for John F. Kennedy

== Military ==
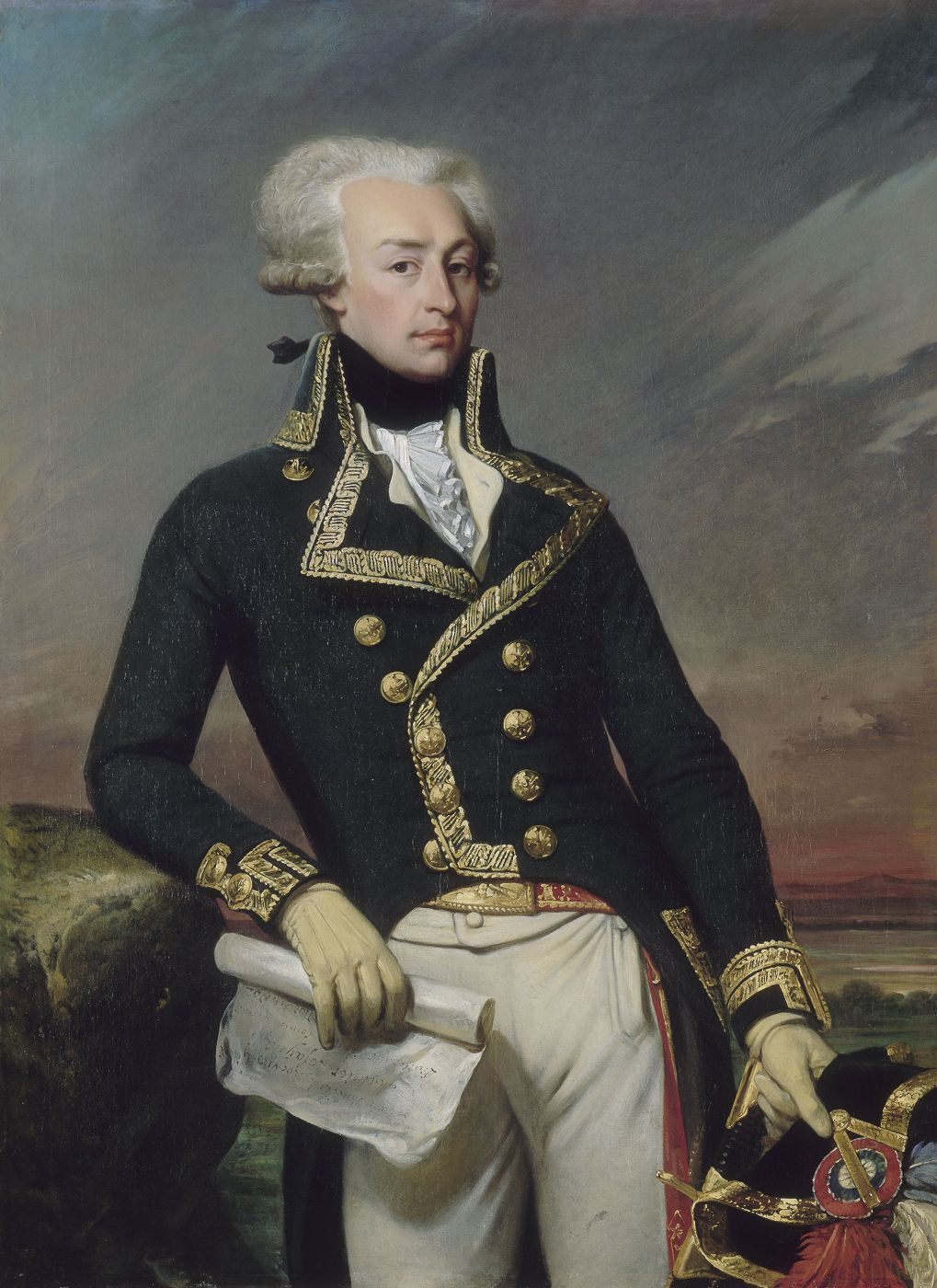
Marquis de Lafayette, known as "The Hero of the Two Worlds" for his accomplishments in the service of the United States in the American War of Independence.

- Augustin de La Balme, General of Cavalry during the American Revolution
- John Bayard, Colonel in the Continental Army
- George Dashiell Bayard, grandson of John Bayard brigadier general in the Union Army
- P. G. T. Beauregard, general for the Confederate Army during the American Civil War, writer, civil servant and inventor
- Frank Besson, U.S. General
- Albert Gallatin Blanchard, Civil War General in the Confederate Army
- Joseph Blanchard, Lieutenant during the French-Indian War
- Jerome Napoleon Bonaparte II, serving in American and French Armies.
- Benjamin Bonneville, French-born officer in the United States Army, fur trapper, and explorer in the American West
- Mitch Bouyer (1837–1876), interpreter/guide in the Old West following the American Civil War, killed at the Battle of the Little Bighorn on June 25, 1876
- Claire Lee Chennault, World War II aviator and founder of the Flying Tigers
- Godfrey Chevalier, pioneer of the naval aviation.
- Davy Crockett, American folk hero, frontiersman, soldier, and politician. The earliest known paternal ancestor was Gabriel Gustave de Crocketagne, whose son Antoine de Saussure Peronette de Crocketagne was given a commission in the Household Troops under French King Louis XIV.
- Claudius Crozet, French-born educator and civil engineer
- Stephen Decatur (1779–1820), naval officer notable for his heroism in actions at Tripoli, Libya in the Barbary Wars and in the War of 1812
- Xavier Debray, French-born officer who served as Brigadier General in the Confederate Army
- Wilmot Gibbes de Saussure, Brigadier General in the Confederate Army
- Lewis DuBois, American Revolutionary War commander
- Dudley M. DuBose, Brigadier General in the Confederate Army
- Michael Durant, Army pilot officer
- William G. Fournier, Army soldier and a recipient of the military's highest decoration—the Medal of Honor—for his actions in World War II.
- Rene Gagnon (1925–1979), one of the U.S. Marines immortalized in the famous World War II photograph (by Joe Rosenthal) of the raising of the flag on Iwo Jima
- Victor Girardey, French-born immigrant who served as brigadier General in the Confederate States Army
- Richard Grenier, lieutenant in the Naval Academy
- Robert Grenier, longtime CIA officer who served as the CIA's top counter-terrorism official in 2005
- Florent Groberg, Medal of Honor recipient. Born in France to French mother and American father
- Louis Hébert, Brigadier General in the Confederate Army
- Paul Octave Hébert, cousin of Louis Hébert, Governor of Louisiana and Brigadier General in the Confederate Army.
- Jean Joseph Amable Humbert, figure in New France's military who settled in New Orleans in 1808
- Papa Jack Laine, bandleader
- Leon J. LaPorte, four-star general
- Leonard LaRue, Captain aboard the SS Meredith Victory during the Korean War 1950–1953
- Robert E. Lee (1807–1870), General of the Confederate Army during the American Civil War 1861–1865, a descendant of military engineer Nicolas Martiau
- John A. Lejeune, U.S. Marine Corps lieutenant general and the 13th Commandant of the Marine Corps. Nicknamed "the greatest of all Leathernecks".
- Curtis Emerson LeMay (1906–1990), Chief of Staff of the U.S. Air Force from 1961 to 1965.
- William Lenoir, American Revolutionary War officer and prominent statesman in late 18th-century and early 19th-century North Carolina
- Robert C. Macon, Army General during World War II; commanded the 83rd Infantry Division during the drive across Europe and served as military attaché in Moscow
- Arthur Middleton Manigault, Brigadier General in the Confederate Army
- Francis Marion (1732–1795), Brigadier General during American Revolutionary War; known as "Swamp Fox"; one of the fathers of modern guerrilla warfare
- Nicolas Martiau (1591–1657), military engineer of Jamestown, Virginia 1620, ancestor of President George Washington
- Dabney H. Maury, Major General in the Confederate Army
- Benjamin McCulloch (1811–1862), Texas Ranger, military officer, California 49er, sheriff, U.S. Marshall, U.S. Peace Commissioner ending the Utah War of 1857–58, a descendant of Nicolas Martiau
- Henry Eustace McCulloch (1816–1895), Texas Ranger, military officer in the Texas Revolution as well as the Mexican-American War and the American Civil War, a descendant of Nicolas Martiau
- Gilbert du Motier, Marquis de La Fayette (1757–1834), aristocrat, considered a national hero in both France and the United States for his participation in the French and American revolutions, for which he became an honorary citizen of the United States
- Alfred Mouton, Confederate general in the American Civil War
- Prince Achille Murat, former colonel who settled in New France
- Thomas Nelson Jr. (1738–1789), Brigadier General, Signer of the Declaration of Independence, Governor of Virginia, descendant of Nicolas Martiau
- Abner Monroe Perrin, Brigadier General in the Confederate Army
- John Joseph Pershing (1860–1948), General of the Armies – commander of the American Expeditionary Forces (AEF) on the Western Front in World War I, 1917–18. Pershing's great-great-grandfather, Frederick Pershing, whose name originally was Pfoerschin, emigrated from Alsace in 1749
- Camille Armand Jules Marie, Prince de Polignac, French officer who served as Major General in the Confederate Army
- Stephen Rochefontaine, Chief of Engineers of the Continental Army
- Frederick Rosier, Royal Air Force commander
- Gilbert Moxley Sorrel, Brigadier General in the Confederate Army
- Pierre Sprey (1937–2021), defense analyst and member of Fighter Mafia group
- John Bordenave Villepigue (1830–1862), Brigadier General in the confederate Army
- Lewis Warrington (1782–1851), captain in the US Navy, distinguished in the Barbary Wars illegitimitate son of Donatien-Marie-Joseph de Vimeur, vicomte de Rochambeau

== Religion ==
- Antoine Blanc, fourth Bishop and first Archbishop of the Roman Catholic Archdiocese of New Orleans
- Roy Bourgeois, American priest in the Maryknoll order of the Roman Catholic Church and founder of the human rights group SOA Watch
- Charles J. Chaput, 9th and current Archbishop of Philadelphia
- Anton Docher (1852–1928), The Padre of Isleta and Indians protector, New Mexico
- Claude Marie Dubuis, second Roman Catholic bishop of Texas
- Peter L'Huillier, retired archbishop of the Orthodox Church in America's Diocese of New York and New Jersey
- Jean-Baptiste Lamy (1814–1888), first Archbishop of the Roman Catholic Archdiocese of Santa Fe, New Mexico
- Pope Leo XIV, born Robert Francis Prevost, first North American pope of the Roman Catholic Church
- Mathias Loras (1792–1858), priest who later became the first Bishop of the Dubuque Diocese in what would become the state of Iowa
- Tammy Faye Messner
- Michael Portier (1795–1859), Roman Catholic bishop and the first Bishop of Mobile

== Science ==
- Felicie Albert, French-born American physicist
- Paul André Albert (1926–2019), metallurgist and technology pioneer
- John James Audubon (1785–1851), ornithologist, naturalist, and painter
- Daniel Barringer, geologist and son of Daniel Moreau Barringer, congressman
- William Beaumont, surgeon in the Army; known as the "father of gastric physiology"
- P. G. T. Beauregard, inventor, author, civil servant, politician, and the first prominent general for the Confederate States Army during the American Civil War
- Jonathan Betts-LaCroix, chief technical officer of OQO
- Thomas Blanchard, inventor, awarded over 25 patents for his creations
- Octave Chanute, railway engineer and aviation pioneer hailed as the father of aviation
- Louis Chevrolet, co-founder of the Chevrolet brand cars with William C. Durant
- Philippe Cousteau Jr., environmentalist
- Georges A. Deschamps, electrical engineer
- Gustave W. Drach, architect
- René Dubos (1901–1982), microbiologist, experimental pathologist, environmentalist, humanist, and Pulitzer Prize-winning author
- William C. Durant, leading pioneer of the United States automobile industry, co-founder of Chevrolet cars with Louis Chevrolet
- William F. Durand, forerunner of NASA, first civilian chair of the National Advisory Committee for Aeronautics, naval officer and pioneer mechanical engineer
- John C. Garand, inventor, gunsmith and machinist
- Karl Guthe Jansky, physicist
- Napoleon LeBrun, architect of several notable Philadelphia churches
- Pierre Charles L'Enfant (1754–1825), architect and urban planner (Note: Born in Paris to George L'Enfant and Frances Ragond, and immigrated to the U.S.)
- William B. Lenoir, former NASA astronaut
- John Bevins Moisant (1868–1910), American aviator
- Matilde E. Moisant (1878–1964), American pioneer aviator and sister of John Bevins Moisant
- Paco Nathan, computer scientist, author, and performance art show producer
- Norbert Rilleaux, inventor, engineer
- Michel (Michael) Ter-Pogossian (1925–1996), physicist; the father of positron emission tomography
- Edward Livingston Trudeau (1848–1915), physician who established the Adirondack Cottage Sanitorium at Saranac Lake for treatment of tuberculosis
- Vincent du Vigneaud, American biochemist and Nobel Prize winner

== Sports ==
=== Baseball ===
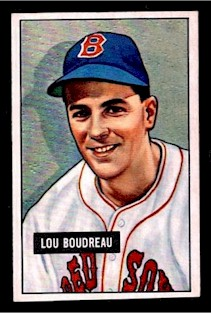
Hall of Famer Lou Boudreau

- Danny Ardoin (born 1974), baseball player (catcher)
- Peter Bergeron, baseball player
- Brett Bochy, baseball pitcher
- Bruce Bochy, baseball manager
- Lou Boudreau, Hall of Fame baseball player
- Mike DeJean, baseball player
- Jim Duquette, current vice president of baseball operations for the Baltimore Orioles
- Leo Durocher, Brooklyn Dodgers player and Manager and Hall of Famer
- Andre Ethier, baseball player, French father
- Mike Fontenot (born 1980), Louisiana State University and Major League Baseball infielder
- Ray Fontenot (born 1957), former Major League pitcher
- Jeff Francoeur, baseball player
- Greg Gagne, baseball player
- Chad Gaudin, baseball player
- Tom Glavine, baseball pitcher
- Ron Guidry, former baseball player
- Cal Hubbard, former baseball umpire
- Nap Lajoie, Hall of Fame former second baseman in Major League Baseball
- Gene Lamont, former catcher and who managed the Chicago White Sox (1992–1995) and Pittsburgh Pirates (1997–2000)
- Jim Lefebvre, former second baseman, third baseman and manager in Major League Baseball
- Edward LeRoux, club owner
- Max Macon, Major League Baseball player and manager
- John Maine, current New York Mets pitcher
- Charlie Manuel, manager of the Philadelphia Phillies
- Rabbit Maranville, Major League Baseball Hall of Famer
- Jason Marquis, pitcher for the Chicago Cubs
- Wilmer Mizell, Major League Baseball player for the Pittsburgh Pirates and the St. Louis Cardinals
- Bill Monbouquette, baseball player, member of Red Sox Hall of Fame
- Andy Pettitte, starting pitcher for the NY Yankees
- Jerry Remy, Red Sox second baseman; later TV presenter
- Edd Roush (1893–1988), center field baseball player and Hall of Famer
- Scott Servais (born 1967), manager of the Seattle Mariners
- Ryan Theriot (born 1979), second baseman for the Chicago Cubs; born in Baton Rouge, Louisiana

=== Basketball ===
- Paul Arizin (1928–2006), former basketball player and Hall-of-Famer
- Bob Cousy, former NBA player and Hall-of-Famer
- Pat Durham, American former professional basketball
- Marcus Gaither (1961–2020), American-French basketball player
- Edwin Jackson, basketball player for Unicaja Malaga
- Zach LaVine, NBA basketball player (Minnesota Timberwolves)
- Joakim Noah, NBA basketball player (Chicago Bulls)
- Tony Parker, NBA basketball player (San Antonio Spurs)
- Mickaël Piétrus, former NBA basketball player
- Robert Sacre, Canadian-American basketball player, son of Greg LaFleur
- Gabby Williams, WNBA basketball player (Golden State Valkyries)
- Bob Pettit (1932–2026), former NBA basketball player and Hall-Of-Famer
- Dominique Wilkins, NBA basketball player

=== Football ===
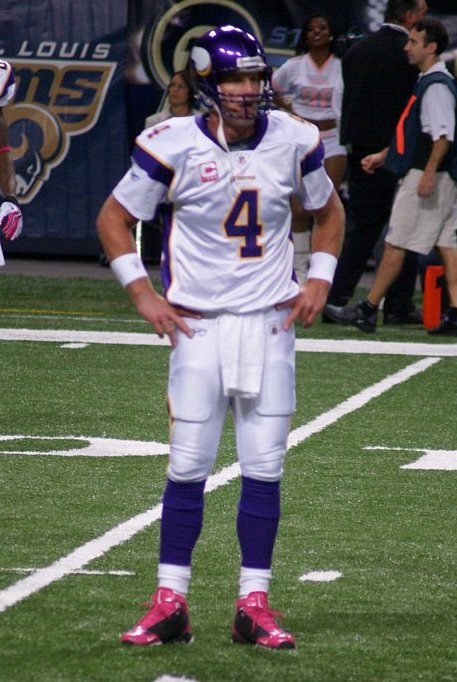
Brett Favre

- George Andrie (1940–2018), player for the Dallas Cowboys
- David Bergeron (born 1981), player, with Carolina Panthers
- Steve Broussard, former punter for the Green Bay Packers
- Steve Broussard, former NFL running back; played for Atlanta Falcons, Seattle Seahawks, and the Cincinnati Bengals
- Chris DeFrance, wide receiver for the Washington Redskins
- Cooper DeJean, NFL cornerback
- Joe DeLamielleure, former American football offensive lineman
- Jake Delhomme, NFL quarterback
- Greg DeLong, former NFL tight end
- Keith DeLong, former linebacker for the San Francisco 49ers
- A.J. Duhe, linebacker/defensive end, Miami Dolphins
- Billy Joe DuPree, Cowboys player of French Creole descent
- Brett Favre (born 1969), NFL quarterback, descended from Jean Faure / Favre; born in Royan, Poitou-Charentes, France
- Jerry Fontenot, NFL offensive center for the Bears, Saints and Packers
- Gus Frerotte, NFL quarterback
- Mitch Frerotte (died 2008), NFL lineman; cousin of Gus Frerotte
- Mark Gastineau, former New York Jets
- Joe Germaine, NFL player, originally drafted by the St. Louis Rams in 1999
- Dorial Green-Beckham, NFL wide receiver, Tennessee Titans
- Ray Guy, former punter for the Oakland Raiders
- Bobby Hebert, former NFL quarterback
- Brock Huard, Seattle Seahawks former quarterback
- Damon Huard, former quarterback for the Kansas City Chiefs, New England Patriots, Miami Dolphins, Cincinnati Bengals, and San Francisco 49ers
- Dick Jauron, Buffalo Bills head coach
- Charlie Joiner, San Diego Chargers player
- David LaFleur, player in heart of Dallas Cowboys
- Greg LaFleur, former player; now the athletic director at Southern University; father of Robert Sacre
- Curly Lambeau, player, coach, and founder of the Green Bay Packers
- Jack Lambert, NFL Hall of Famer and one of the Steelers' greatest players
- Greg Landry, former Detroit Lions quarterback
- Tom Landry, coach, Dallas Cowboys
- Steve Largent, NFL Hall of Famer
- Chad Lavalais, NFL player
- Dick LeBeau, Pittsburgh Steelers defensive coordinator; former football player
- Roger LeClerc, former player for the Denver Broncos and Chicago Bears
- Stefan LeFors, football quarterback
- Frank LeMaster, former linebacker for the Philadelphia Eagles
- Josh LeRibeus, guard for Washington Redskins
- Billy Lyon, former defensive tackle for the Green Bay Packers and Minnesota Vikings
- Tyrann Mathieu, Arizona Cardinals player, French Creole
- Tommy Mont, former Washington Redskins quarterback
- Luke Petitgout, NFL defender on the New York Giants team
- Noel Prefontaine, CFL kicker with the Edmonton Eskimos
- Darrell Royal, winningest football coach in University of Texas Longhorn history; College Football Hall of Fame member
- Bob St. Clair, NFL Hall of Famer; player for the 49ers
- Brian St. Pierre, quarterback originally drafted by the Pittsburgh Steelers
- Jim Thorpe (1888–1953), Hall of Fame football player; 1/2 Native American, 1/4 Irish, and 1/4 French; also a star baseball, basketball, and an Olympic star
- Mike Tolbert, player for the Carolina Panthers
- Dick Vermeil, former NFL player
- Christian Yount (born 1988), American football long snapper for the Cleveland Browns

=== Hockey ===
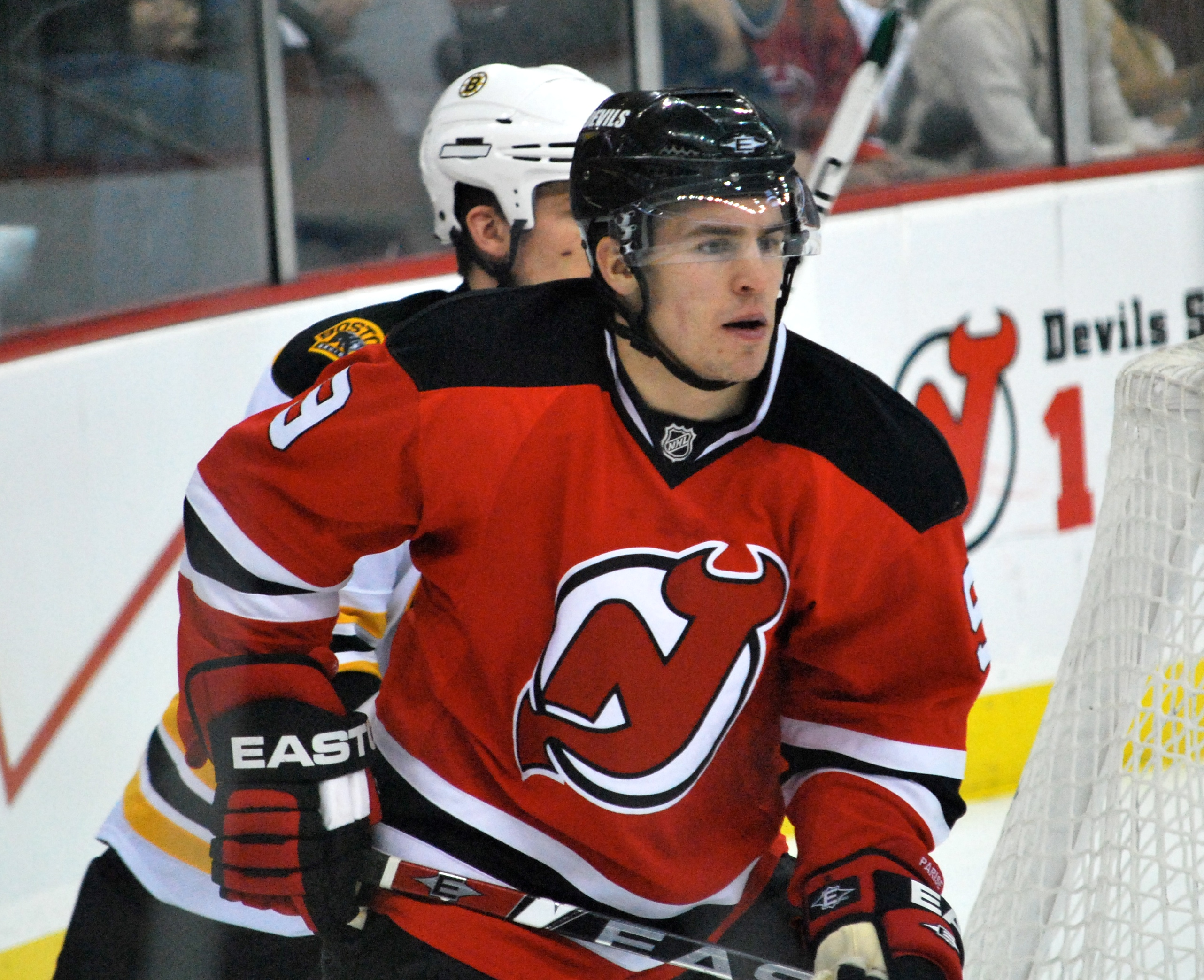
Zach Parise

- Bryan Berard, former professional ice hockey player
- Donald Brashear, former professional ice hockey player
- Thomas Bordeleau, professional ice hockey player currently playing for the San Jose Sharks
- Brian Boucher, former professional ice hockey goaltender and current analyst
- Francis Bouillon, former professional ice hockey player
- Sean Couturier, professional ice hockey currently playing for the Philadelphia Flyers
- Johnny Gaudreau, professional ice hockey player for the Columbus Blue Jackets
- Guy Hebert, former professional ice hockey goaltender
- Pat Lafontaine, former professional ice hockey player
- John LeClair, former professional ice hockey player
- Paul Martin, hockey player
- Zach Parise, professional ice hockey player currently playing for the New York Islanders
- Philippe Sauvé, former professional ice hockey goaltender

=== NASCAR ===
- Greg Biffle, NASCAR driver
- Brett Bodine, NASCAR driver
- Geoff Bodine, NASCAR driver
- Todd Bodine, NASCAR driver
- Bill France Sr. (1909–1992), co-founder of NASCAR
- Bobby Labonte, NASCAR driver and brother of Terry Labonte
- Terry Labonte, NASCAR driver and brother of Bobby Labonte
- Corey LaJoie, NASCAR driver and son of Randy LaJoie
- Randy LaJoie, NASCAR driver and father of Corey LaJoie
- Jack Roush, NASCAR team owner

=== Rodeo ===
- Earl W. Bascom (1906–1995), rodeo pioneer, rodeo champion, rodeo hall of fame inductee, "father of modern rodeo"
- Chris LeDoux (1948–2005), world champion bareback bronc rider and country music artist
- J.B. Mauney, world champion bull rider

=== Soccer ===
- Davy Arnaud (born 1980), soccer coach and former player
- Sydney Leroux (born 1990), soccer player
- Roger Levesque (born 1981), soccer player
- Brian Maisonneuve (born 1973), former soccer player
- Bert Patenaude (1909–1974), Hall-of-Famer and first player to score a hat-trick in a FIFA World Cup
- David Regis (born 1968), former soccer defender
- Quentin Westberg (born 1986), football (soccer) goalkeeper, playing for Troyes AC in France's Ligue 1

=== Tennis ===
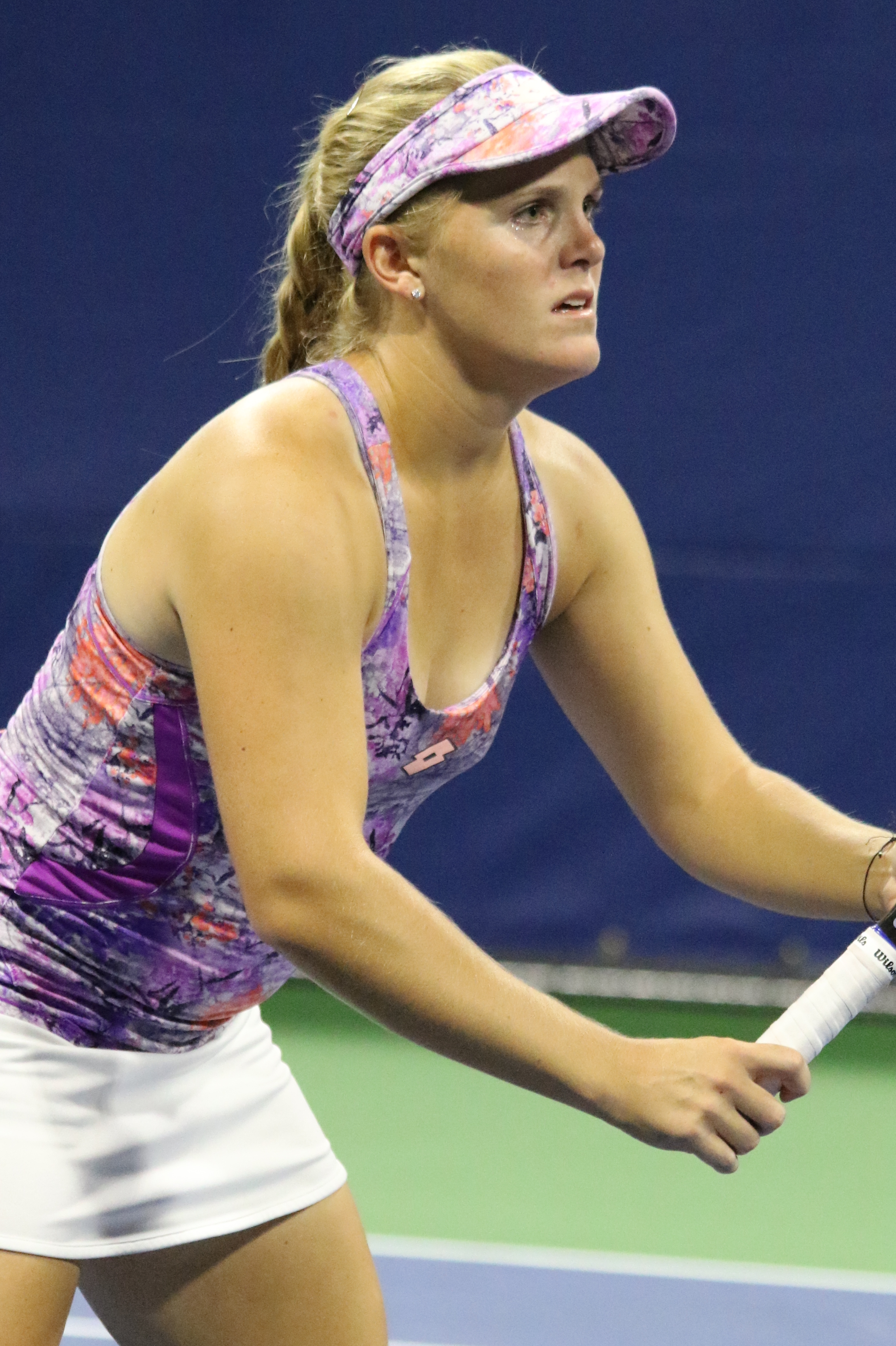
Melanie Oudin

- Jim Courier (born 1970), professional tennis player
- Robert LeRoy (1885–1946), professional tennis player
- Melanie Oudin, professional tennis player
- Mary Pierce, tennis player who won multiple Grand Slam titles

=== Other sports ===
- Laila Ali (born 1977), professional boxer; daughter of Muhammad Ali and his Louisiana Creole wife
- Surya Bonaly (born 1973), professional figure skater
- Walter Cartier, boxer
- Randy Couture, mixed martial arts champion
- Jean Cruguet (born 1939), thoroughbred horse racing jockey who won the United States Triple Crown of Thoroughbred Racing
- Bryson DeChambeau, professional golfer
- Eddie Delahoussaye, former quarter-horse jockey
- Kent Desormeaux, Hall of Fame jockey
- Bob Duval, professional golfer; known for being the father of David Duval, formerly the top-ranked player in the world
- David Duval, professional golfer and former World No. 1 who competes on the PGA Tour
- Eric Guerin, Hall of Fame jockey
- Hulk Hogan, professional wrestler; French on his maternal side
- Philip Lafond, professional wrestler
- Jack LaLanne, fitness, exercise and nutritional expert
- Jason Lamy-Chappuis, French Nordic combined athlete who has been competing since 2002
- Edward LeMaire, pro figure skater
- Greg LeMond, cyclist and three-time winner of the Tour de France
- Lash LeRoux, professional wrestler
- Louis Meyer (1904–1995), American Hall of Fame race car driver best known as the first three-time winner of the Indianapolis 500
- Francis Ouimet, golf player
- Allaire du Pont, American sportswoman and a member of the prominent French-American Du Pont family
- Steve Prefontaine, legendary middle and long-distance runner and first athlete to represent the Nike brand
- Nicolas Rossolimo (1910–1975), Chess Grandmaster, chess champion of France and U.S. Open champion
- Régis Sénac, fencer and instructor
- Craig Titus, IFBB professional bodybuilder
- Martin Trainer, PGA Tour golfer
- Triple H (born 1969), professional wrestler
- Benny Valger, nicknamed "The French Flash", American professional featherweight boxer who fought from the late 1910s until the 1930s

== Other ==
=== Art ===
- Jack E. Boucher, photographer
- Xavier Fourcade, art dealer
- Steve Lavigne, American comic book illustrator best known for his lettering and coloring on Teenage Mutant Ninja Turtles comics
- Raymond Loewy, designer
- Richard Marquis, glass artist
- Daniel Wildenstein, art dealer

=== Cuisine ===
- Anthony Bourdain, author and the "Chef-at-Large" of Brasserie Les Halles
- Wylie Dufresne, chef and owner of WD~50 restaurant in Manhattan
- Nathalie Dupree, chef, cookbook author, and cooking show host
- Pierre Franey, chef
- Emeril Lagasse, celebrity chef, restaurateur, television personality, and cookbook author
- Jacques Pépin, chef
- Paul Prudhomme, chef
- Justin Wilson, chef

=== Miscellanea ===
- Frank Abagnale (born 1948), impostor
- Jérôme Napoléon Bonaparte, farmer, president of Maryland Club
- Mary Katherine Campbell (1905–1990), Miss America titleholder, 1922 and 1923; first runner-up 1924; of Cajun ancestry
- Derek Chauvin, former Minneapolis police officer convicted in the murder of George Floyd.
- Simon Favre, 18th-century interpreter of Muscogean languages; ancestor of Brett Favre
- Charles Guiteau, assassin of U.S. President James Garfield
- Alice Heine, American-born Princess of Monaco
- Jean Lafitte, sometimes spelled Laffite (c. 1780–c. 1826), Gulf of Mexico pirate, who provided critical support and expert artillery gunners to the American forces under Gen. Andrew Jackson in January 1815, at the Battle of New Orleans
- Wayne LaPierre, President of the National Rifle Association of America
- Marie Laveau, voodoo queen
- Ervil LeBaron, Mormon fundamentalist prophet; ordered the killings of many of his opponents
- Carlene LeFevre, competitive eater; wife of Rich LeFevre
- Rich LeFevre, nicknamed "The Locust"; competitive eater; husband of Carlene LeFevre
- Bugs Moran, born Adelard Cunin to Jules and Marie Diana Gobeil Cunin, French immigrants, in Saint Paul, Minnesota
- Georges de Paris, French-American tailor of the United States presidents
- Albert Simard (d. 1973), Legion of Honour, activist
- Elmo Patrick Sonnier, convicted murderer and rapist executed
- Virginie de Ternant (1818–1887), owner and manager of Parlange Plantation

== See also ==
- List of Cajuns
- List of Louisiana Creoles
