= Poulain =

Poulain is the French word for foal and is a common French surname. It may refer to:

== People ==
- Amélie Poulain, central character of romantic comedy film Amélie
- Jean-Paul Poulain, a French cabaret singer
- Raphaël Poulain (b. 1980), French rugby player
- Gabriel Poulain, French cyclist (active early 20th century)
- Benoît Poulain (b. 1987), French footballer
- Michel-Marie Poulain (1906–1991), French painter

== Other uses ==
- Chocolat Poulain, a French chocolate brand

== See also ==
- Poulaine (disambiguation)
