= Poulaine (disambiguation) =

Poulaine or Poulains or similar, may refer to:

- Poulain (disambiguation), a French surname
- Poulaines, France, a commune
- Poulaine, a medieval style of shoe with pointed toes
- Poulaine, a 2009 album by the group Celer
- Poulaine, a character from the 1965 film Cent briques et des tuiles
