= Joseph Merchant =

American politician (1844–1914)

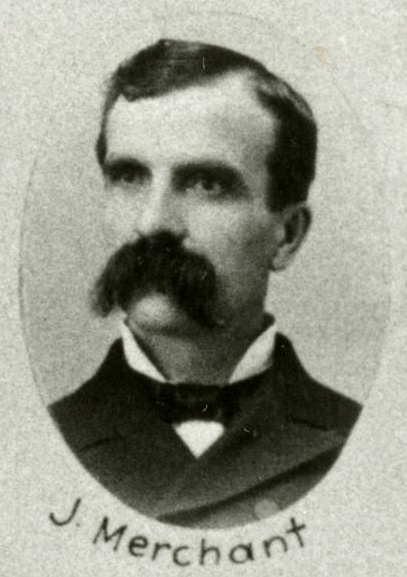
- Merchant in 1895

Member of the Washington House of Representatives for the 21st district
- In office 1893–1897

Personal details
- Born: October 3, 1844 near Strasbourg, Alsace, France
- Died: June 22, 1914 (aged 69) Seattle, Washington, United States
- Party: Republican

Joseph Merchant (October 3, 1844 – June 22, 1914) was an American politician in the state of Washington. He served in the Washington House of Representatives from 1893 to 1897.
