= Bernard Renaud =

French-American painter, sculptor, illustrator and author

- Born: 1935 (age 90–91)
- Occupations: Painter, sculptor, illustrator and author

Bernard Renaud (known as "Renot") (born in Lyon, France, 1935) is a French-American painter, sculptor, illustrator and author. He won the 2004 "French Merit and Devotion" Laureate - Gold Medal recipient, presented by the French Government.
