= John Lewis Gervais =

American politician

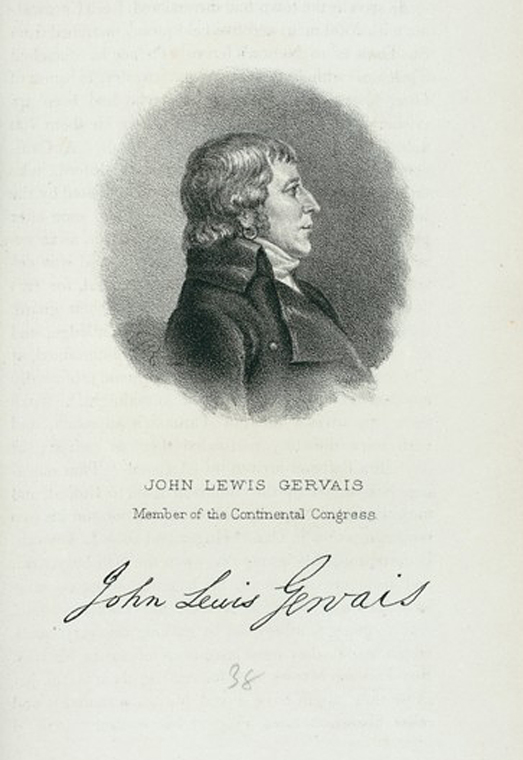
John Lewis Gervais

John Lewis Gervais (/dʒərˈveɪ/; jər-VAY; 1741–1798) was an American planter and statesman from South Carolina. He served as a delegate to the Continental Congress in 1782 and 1783.

== Life and career ==
Gervais was born in Hanover, Germany where his parents were French Huguenot refugees in 1741. He emigrated to South Carolina, arriving in Charleston in 1764. He started in the mercantile business, but soon expanded his interests to include a plantation.

Gervais first served in the revolutionary Provincial Congress in 1775. He was a member of the state's Committee of Safety from 1775 to 1781. Under the new state government, he was elected to South Carolina's Senate in 1781 and 1782.

The legislature sent him as a delegate to the Continental Congress in Philadelphia in 1782 and 1783. On 10 September 1782, he voted for a motion that the secretary for foreign affairs be directed to obtain returns of slaves and property carried off by the enemy during the war, such information to be used in negotiating a peace. In April 1783, he was a member of a committee to which were referred letters from U.S. representatives abroad, and on 15 April of that year favored instructing the commander-in-chief to arrange with the commander of the British forces for receiving possession of the posts in the United States that were occupied by British troops.

He came home in 1784, and was returned to the State Senate. In 1786, Senator Gervais led the efforts in the legislature to establish a new state capital. The result was the founding of Columbia, South Carolina, where Gervais Street, the city's major east-west thoroughfare, is named for him.

He died in Charleston on 18 August 1798 and is buried in St. Philip's Churchyard there.
