= Eric H. du Plessis =

French author and educator

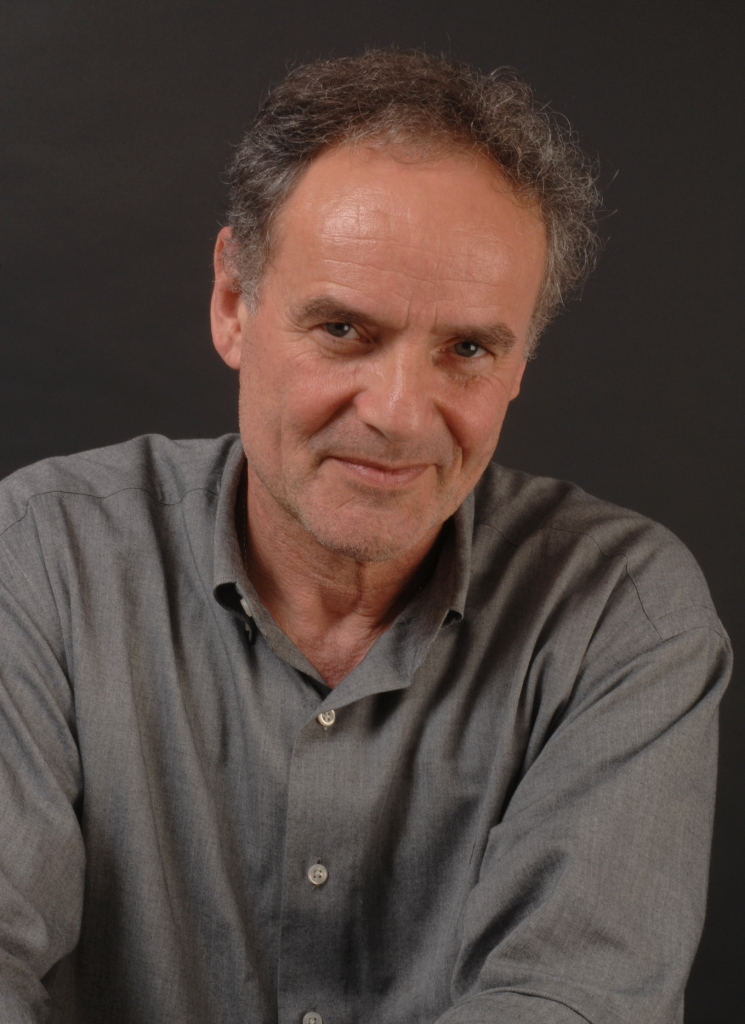
Éric Hollingsworth du Plessis photograph

Éric Hollingsworth du Plessis is an author, translator and educator living in Virginia. He is a professor emeritus at Radford University, where he taught French language and literature in the department of Foreign Languages, and writing in the Department of English from 1980 to 2024.

Du Plessis has written or translated several books on philosophy and literature, as well as articles, book chapters and encyclopedia entries. He has published on linguistics, translation and historical/cultural studies in such journals and encyclopedias as Revue de Littérature Comparée, Poe Studies, European Studies Journal, Dalhousie French Studies, Cahiers du CIRhill, Short Story Criticism, The Linacre Quarterly, Les Amis de Flaubert, The World Education Encyclopedia, ALFA, and the World Press Encyclopedia.

== Early life ==
Du Plessis was born in France to Jean-Pierre, a World War II veteran with the British SAS and architect, and Simone Jeanne, a therapist for dyslexic children. After a stint in medical school at the University of Paris, he immigrated to the US and settled in Richmond, Virginia. He attended Virginia Commonwealth University, supporting himself by cleaning floors at Johnston-Willis Hospital, working as a waiter, a substitute teacher at an all-black school, and as a police officer. After graduating from VCU with a degree in philosophy, he studied at the University of Richmond, where he received a master's degree. He went on to the University of Virginia at Charlottesville, Virginia, where he received his Ph.D. in French literature and General Linguistics. Du Plessis then relocated to College Station, Texas], where he worked as an assistant professor at Texas A&M University for seven years. He eventually returned to Virginia and became a full professor at Radford University, where he taught writing and literature until 2024 in the department of English. As a life-long hobby, he has also been active in the field of Japanese martial arts and taught Aiki-jitsu for forty years.

== Publications ==
- The Nineteenth-Century French Novel: A Reader's Path to Classic Fiction. Mellen, 2013. Reviewed in Romance Quarterly, Vol. 62, No. 2 (2014): 151-152, and in Nineteenth-Century French Studies, Vol. 42, No. 3&4 (2014).
- Exiled From Paris: Growing up French in the 1960s. (CreateSpace and Amazon, 2009; revised, second edition 2012), reviewed in Modern and Contemporary France (Routledge, London), Vol. 18 (2010): 127-129, and in The University of Virginia Magazine, Vol. XCIX, No. 3 (2010): 58.(Sources of scholarly publications obtained from current PMLA bibliography.)
- Honore de Balzac's Wann-Chlore. Mellen, 2005. Translated from the French. Reviewed by Mary Wellington in Nineteenth-Century French Studies, Vol. 35, No. 3 (2007): 676-677, and by Stephane Vachon in L'Annee Balzacienne Vol. XXIII (2008): 452-454.
- The NightCharmer and Other Tales of Claude Seignolle. Texas A&M University Press, 1983, Translated from the French with a preface by Lawrence Durrell. Reviewed by Jack Sullivan in The New York Times Book Review, Vol. 89, "This is a slim volume, but a remarkable one. Shivery vignettes linger in the mind like poetry." February 26, 1984, p.22, and in Choice, Vol. 21 (1984): 985.
- Nietzsche en France, 1891-1915 with a preface by Michel Guerin. UPA, 1982. Reviewed by William Carter in The French Review, vol. 59. No. 1 (1985): 139-140, C.H. More in Canadian Review of Comparative Literature, Vol. X, No. 3 (1983): 447-450, and Robert Bessede in Revue d'Histoire Litteraire de la France, Vol. 86 (1986): 158.

== Education ==
- Former student, University of Paris Medical School
- B.A., Virginia Commonwealth University
- M.A., University of Richmond
- Ph.D., University of Virginia
