= Nicolas Martiau =

French immigrant to the 17th C. English colony of Virginia

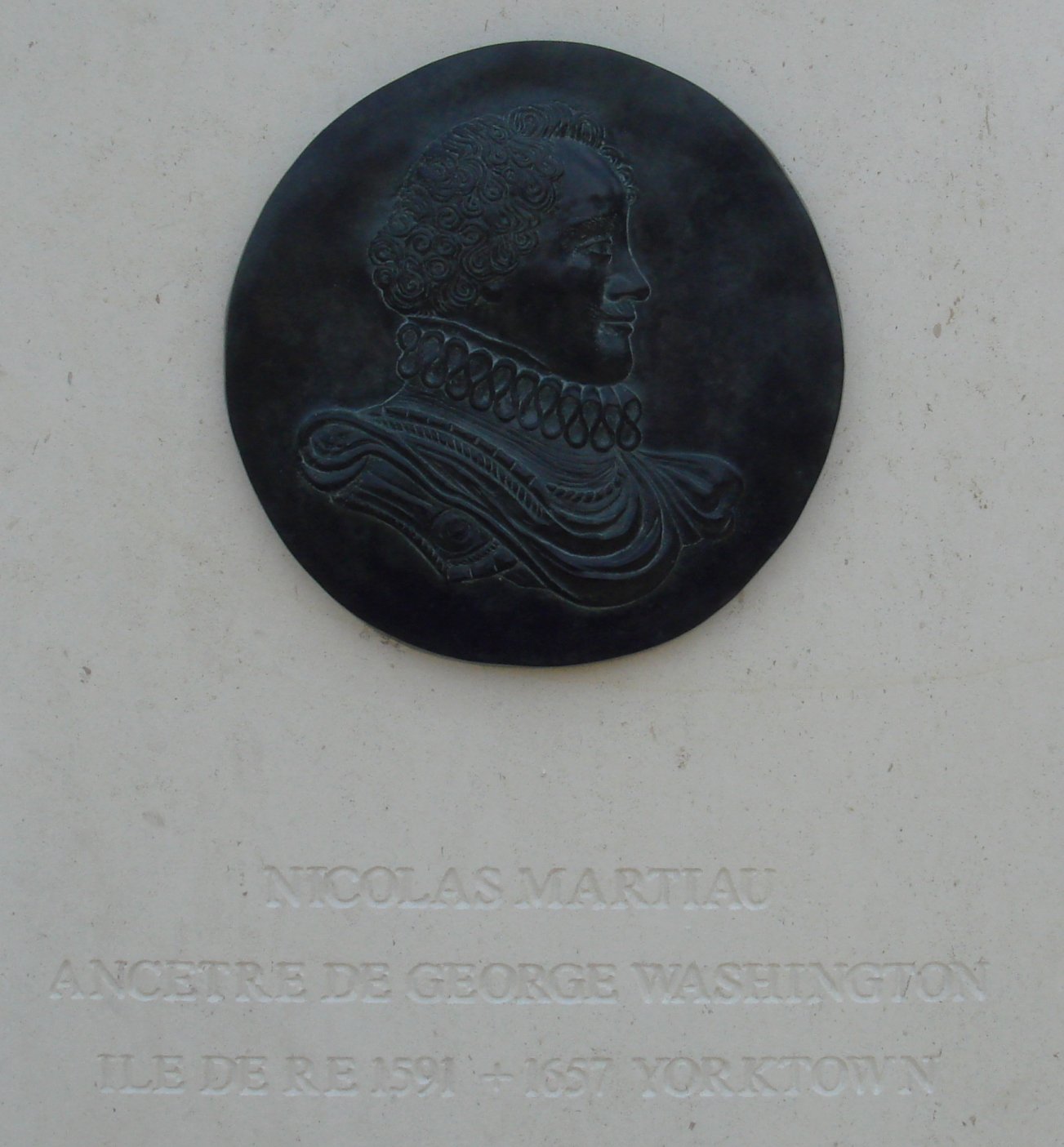
- Medallion representing Nicolas Martiau.
- Born: c. 1591; Île de Ré, Aunis, France
- Died: c. 1657 (aged 65-66); Yorktown, Colony of Virginia, English Empire
- Spouse: Jane Berkeley

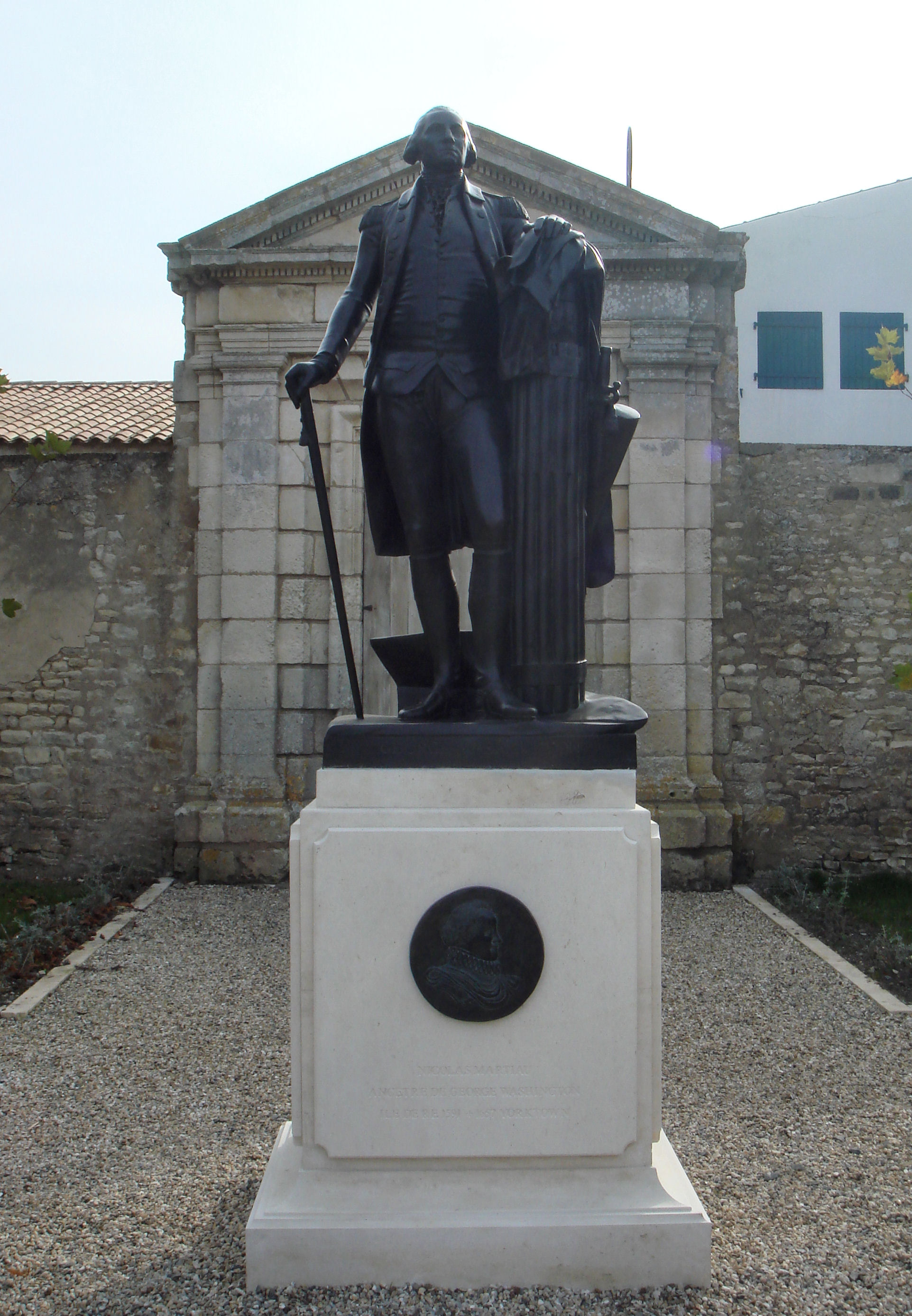
Statue of George Washington, with a medallion of his ancestor from Île de Ré, Nicolas Martiau.

Nicolas Martiau (French pronunciation: [nikɔla maʁtjo]; 1591–1657) was a Frenchman who immigrated to the English colony of Virginia in the 17th century. He was born on the western island of Île de Ré.

The garden behind the Ernest Cognacq Museum in Saint Martin de Ré holds a monument with a statue of George Washington, with the base of the monument featuring a medallion representing Martiau. The monument was inaugurated on October 11, 2007, by the ambassador of the United States to France. The relationship between the two men is described on the monument.

== Life ==
Nothing is known of Martiau's youth except that he had learned to read by studying the Gospels and the Bible. At the same time he absorbed the doctrine of John Calvin, and learned to speak English. It is likely that, because of the political and religious context of the time, he was forced into exile in England since his signature is found on a register and a Huguenot church. On January 11, 1619, he was naturalised English. Nicolas Martiau's will written March 1, 1656/7, proven April 24, 1657, names daughters Elizabeth Reade, Mary Scarsbrook, Sarah Fuller, his three sons-in-law and provided freedom for slaves Phill and Nicholas. He also left one "heifer" to his servant Hugh Roy.

On May 16, 1620, Nicolas Martiau, aged 29, left England on the Francis Bonaventure in August 1620 and arrived in Jamestown where he built the fence defense which allowed the city to be spared in a massacre by the Powhatan Confederacy in 1622. The success of this action earned him the title of "master engineer fences".

Nicolas Martiau was married to Jane Berkeley. In 1646, he remarried Isabel (Isabella) Beech, widow of Robert Felgate and George Beech. He died in Yorktown, Virginia, in 1657.
