= Jean-Paul Poulain =

Jean-Paul P. Poulain (March 18, 1945 – April 24, 2007) was a famous Maine Franco-American Cabaret recording artist . He was a worldwide act who received international acclaim. The last years of Poulain's life were troubled and he was shot and killed on April 24, 2007.
