= Louisiana Highway 68 =

State highway in Louisiana, United States

Louisiana Highway 68

- Route of LA 68 highlighted in red

Route information
- Maintained by Louisiana DOTD
- Length: 19.126 mi (30.780 km)
- Existed: 1955 renumbering–present

Major junctions
- South end: US 61 north of Port Hudson
- LA 10 in Jackson
- North end: LA 19 in Wilson

Location
- Country: United States
- State: Louisiana
- Parishes: East Feliciana

Highway system
- Louisiana State Highway System; Interstate; US; State; Scenic
← LA 67	→ I-69
← SR 73	SR 74	→ SR 75

Louisiana Highway 68 (LA 68) is a state highway located in southeastern Louisiana. It runs 19.13 miles (30.79 km) in a north–south direction from U.S. Highway 61 (US 61) north of Port Hudson to LA 19 in Wilson.

The route traverses rural East Feliciana Parish and runs largely parallel to LA 19, one of the main north–south routes through the area. LA 68 connects the small town of Jackson with Baton Rouge, the state capital, via US 61. Jackson and its surrounding areas include a variety of historic sites, as well as several medical and correctional facilities.

LA 68 was created in the 1955 Louisiana Highway renumbering and travels north–south unlike most even-numbered routes in the range of "primary" state highways. During its first few years of existence, LA 68 extended about five miles (8.0 km) further south into neighboring East Baton Rouge Parish. After a series of improvements completed in the early 1960s, this portion of the route was assumed by US 61, which formerly followed the less direct path of what is now LA 964 through the area.

== Route description ==
From the south, LA 68 begins at a junction with US 61 just east of the Port Hudson State Historic Site in the southwestern corner of East Feliciana Parish. US 61 connects with Baton Rouge to the south and St. Francisville to the northwest. LA 68 heads northeast through a thickly wooded area that is interspersed with light suburban development and straddles the East Baton Rouge Parish line for a short distance. After 2.1 miles (3.4 km), LA 68 crosses the Canadian National Railway (CN) line at grade. The residential development largely disappears as LA 68 proceeds to a junction with LA 964, which connects to the nearby communities of Slaughter and Zachary.

LA 68 continues northeast toward the town of Jackson. About three miles (4.8 km) along the way, the thick pine forest begins to make a scenic canopy over the roadway. After the surroundings open out onto a wide field, LA 68 passes the Dixon Correctional Institute and its small adjacent airstrip. Soon afterward, the highway passes an unmarked entrance to the East Louisiana State Hospital. Upon reaching a junction with LA 10, signs direct motorists to nearby points of interest and important facilities in Jackson and the surrounding area. These include the Villa Feliciana Medical Complex, Louisiana War Veterans Home, and historic sites such as the former Centenary College of Louisiana.

Heading northeast from Jackson, LA 68 intersects LA 963, which connects to a sparsely populated area known as Gurley. 3.7 miles (6.0 km) later, LA 68 enters the small village of Wilson. At a T-intersection with LA 952, LA 68 turns southeast onto Bay Street and proceeds to zigzag northeast onto Grant Street and finally southeast onto Sycamore Street. The highway crosses the former right-of-way of the Gloster Southern Railroad (GLSR) line and reaches its northern terminus at a junction with LA 19 one block from the local post office. LA 19 connects with Slaughter to the south as well as Norwood, a small village near the Mississippi state line, to the north.

=== Route classification and data ===
LA 68 is an undivided two-lane highway for its entire length. The route is classified by the Louisiana Department of Transportation and Development (La DOTD) as a rural major collector south of Jackson and as a rural minor collector between Jackson and Wilson. Daily traffic volume in 2013 averaged between 2,900 and 3,100 vehicles south of Jackson, peaking at 4,000 near the LA 10 junction. The northern portion of the route averaged only 560 vehicles daily. The posted speed limit is generally 55 mph (90 km/h) but is reduced as low as 25 mph (40 km/h) within the village of Wilson.

== History ==
=== Pre-1955 route numbering ===
In the original Louisiana Highway system in use between 1921 and 1955, the modern LA 68 was part of three different state routes, as follows: State Route 888 from the southern terminus to LA 964; State Route 74 to Jackson; and State Route 311 to the northern terminus in Wilson.

State Route 74
- Location: Lindsay–Jackson
- Length: 7.6 mi (12.2 km)
- Existed: 1921–1955

Route 74 was designated in 1921 by the state legislature as one of the original 98 state highway routes. It was a short but important connector between the town of Jackson and State Route 3, which became the original alignment of US 61 in 1926.

Route 74. Beginning near Lindsay Station on Route No. 3 to a point on Route 35, near Jackson.

— 1921 legislative route description

By the end of the decade, the northern and southern extensions of this road connecting to Wilson and Port Hudson, respectively, were taken over by the Louisiana Highway Commission. They were given separate route numbers, however, as was the common practice at the time. Route 74 was improved from a dirt to a gravel road around 1929 and to a paved road in 1949. The route remained otherwise the same during the pre-1955 era.

=== Post-1955 route history ===
LA 68 was created in the 1955 renumbering, creating a continuous route between the Port Hudson area through Jackson to Wilson.

Class "B": La 68—From a junction with La-US 61 near Lindsay to a junction with La 10 at or near Jackson.
Class "C": La 68—From a junction with La-US 61 at or near Alsen through or near Port Hudson to a junction with La-US 61 northwest of Lindsay and from a junction with La 10 east of Jackson to a junction with La 19 at or near Wilson.

— 1955 legislative route description

With the 1955 renumbering, the state highway department initially categorized all routes into three classes: "A" (primary), "B" (secondary), and "C" (farm-to-market). This system has since been updated and replaced by a more specific functional classification system.

As the route description indicates, LA 68 originally had two junctions with US 61, neither of which was located at the present junction. At the time, US 61 followed what is now LA 964 through East Feliciana Parish. The present alignment of US 61 was a gravel road running alongside the Louisiana and Arkansas Railway and was part of LA 68. In the early 1960s, this road was improved and extended north toward the West Feliciana Parish line, streamlining much of US 61 between Baton Rouge and St. Francisville. The LA 68 designation was then truncated to its present southern terminus near Port Hudson. Since then, there have been no other changes to the alignment of LA 68, although some minor curves along the route have been straightened over the years.

== Future ==
La DOTD is currently engaged in a program that aims to transfer about 5,000 miles (8,000 km) of state-owned roadways to local governments over the next several years. Under this plan of "right-sizing" the state highway system, the northern portion of LA 68 between Jackson and Wilson is proposed for deletion as it does not meet a significant interurban travel function.

== Major intersections ==
The entire highway is in East Feliciana Parish.

Location	mi	km	Destinations	Notes
	0.000	0.000	US 61 – Baton Rouge, Natchez	Southern terminus
	3.876	6.238	LA 964 – Slaughter, Baton Rouge	
Jackson	11.343	18.255	LA 10 – Jackson, Clinton	
	14.487	23.315	LA 963	Western terminus of LA 963
Wilson	18.536	29.831	LA 952	Northern terminus of LA 952
Wilson	19.126	30.780	LA 19 – Norwood, Slaughter	Northern terminus
1.000 mi = 1.609 km; 1.000 km = 0.621 mi
