= List of state highways in Louisiana (950–999) =

The following is a list of state highways in the U.S. state of Louisiana designated in the 950–999 range.

== Louisiana Highway 950 ==
Louisiana Highway 950
- Location: Baton Rouge
- Length: 16.3 mi (26.2 km)
- Existed: 1955–1960

Louisiana Highway 950 (LA 950) consisted of 17 road segments with a total length of approximately 16.3 miles (26.2 km) that were located in the city of Baton Rouge, East Baton Rouge Parish. The segments included portions of city streets, some which were pieces of former highway alignments, along with driveways within Louisiana State University and other state government complexes.

- LA 950-1 ran 2.0 miles (3.2 km) along North 3rd Street and Choctaw Drive from Dunbar Avenue to LA 67 (Plank Road).
- LA 950-2 ran 0.4 miles (0.64 km) along North 17th and Foss Streets from Ellerslie Drive to US 61/190 Bus. (Scenic Highway).
- LA 950-3 ran 1.7 miles (2.7 km) along North Street from US 61/190 Bus. (Scenic Highway) to LA 37 (North Foster Drive).
- LA 950-4 ran 1.1 miles (1.8 km) along North Boulevard from 22nd Street to LA 950-6 (Edison Street).
- LA 950-5 ran 1.4 miles (2.3 km) along Reymond Avenue, Eugene Street, and Buckner Drive from LA 427 (Perkins Road) to LA 950-4 (North Boulevard).
- LA 950-6 ran 0.3 miles (0.48 km) along Edison Street from LA 950-7 (Government Street) to LA 950-4 (North Boulevard).
- LA 950-7 ran 1.4 miles (2.3 km) along Government Street from St. Rose Avenue to LA 73 (South Foster Drive).
- LA 950-8 ran 2.0 miles (3.2 km) along Government Street and Lobdell Avenue in a loop off of LA 73 (Jefferson Highway).
- LA 950-9 ran 1.8 miles (2.9 km) along North Stadium and Dalrymple Drives from LA 30 (Nicholson Drive) to March Street.
- LA 950-10 ran 2.3 miles (3.7 km) along Highland Road from LA 30 (Nicholson Drive Extension) to Terrace Avenue.
- LA 950-11 ran 0.3 miles (0.48 km) along West Campus Drive from LA 950-10 (Highland Road) to LA 950-9 (Dalrymple Drive).
- LA 950-12 ran 0.5 miles (0.80 km) along South Stadium and South Campus Drives from LA 30 (Nicholson Drive) to LA 950-13 (Tower Drive).
- LA 950-13 ran 0.3 miles (0.48 km) along Tower Drive from LA 950-12 (South Campus Drive) to LA 950-9 (Dalrymple Drive).
- LA 950-14 ran 0.1 miles (0.16 km) along Raphael Semmes Road from LA 950-13 (Tower Drive) to LA 950-10 (Highland Road).
- LA 950-15 ran 0.2 miles (0.32 km) along Tower Circle from LA 950-14 (Raphael Semmes Road) to LA 950-9 (Dalrymple Drive).
- LA 950-16 ran 0.1 miles (0.16 km) within the Louisiana Department of Highways Testing Laboratory grounds off of LA 73 (South Foster Drive).
- LA 950-17 ran 0.4 miles (0.64 km) within the Louisiana State Police complex off of LA 73 (South Foster Drive).

== Louisiana Highway 951 ==
Louisiana Highway 951
- Location: Jackson
- Length: 2.6 mi (4.2 km)
- Existed: 1955–2008

Louisiana Highway 951 (LA 951) consisted of approximately 2.6 miles (4.2 km) of driveways within the East Louisiana State Hospital grounds and detached forensic facility off of LA 10 in Jackson, East Feliciana Parish.

== Louisiana Highway 952 ==
Louisiana Highway 952
- Location: Jackson–Wilson
- Length: 10.193 mi (16.404 km)
- Existed: 1955–present

Louisiana Highway 952 (LA 952) runs 10.19 miles (16.40 km) in a southwest to northeast direction from LA 10 in Jackson to LA 68 in Wilson.

The entire highway is in East Feliciana Parish.

Location	mi	km	Destinations	Notes
Jackson	0.000	0.000	LA 10 (Charter Street) – Clinton, St. Francisville	Southern terminus
Wilson	10.193	16.404	LA 68 (Bay Street) – Wilson, Gurley	Northern terminus
1.000 mi = 1.609 km; 1.000 km = 0.621 mi

== Louisiana Highway 953 ==
Louisiana Highway 953
- Location: McManus
- Length: 0.331 mi (533 m)
- Existed: 1955–present

Louisiana Highway 953 (LA 953) runs 0.33 miles (0.53 km) in a southwest to northeast direction from a local road to LA 10 in McManus. The route's mileposts increase from the northern or eastern end contrary to common practice.

The entire highway is in McManus, East Feliciana Parish.

mi	km	Destinations	Notes
0.331	0.533	Begin state maintenance at Elliott Lane	Southwestern terminus
0.000	0.000	LA 10 – Jackson, Clinton	Northeastern terminus
1.000 mi = 1.609 km; 1.000 km = 0.621 mi

== Louisiana Highway 954 ==
Louisiana Highway 954
- Location: East Feliciana Parish
- Length: 0.992 mi (1,596 m)
- Existed: 1955–present

Louisiana Highway 954 (LA 954) runs 0.99 miles (1.59 km) in a north–south direction from US 61 to LA 964 northwest of Zachary.

It is an undivided two-lane highway for its entire length.

The entire route is in East Feliciana Parish.

mi	km	Destinations	Notes
0.000– 0.013	0.000– 0.021	US 61 – St. Francisville, Baton Rouge	Southern terminus
0.992	1.596	LA 964	Northern terminus
1.000 mi = 1.609 km; 1.000 km = 0.621 mi

== Louisiana Highway 955 ==
Louisiana Highway 955
- Location: East Feliciana Parish
- Length: 17.110 mi (27.536 km)
- Existed: 1955–present

Louisiana Highway 955 (LA 955) runs 17.60 miles (28.32 km) in a southwest to northeast direction from LA 412 west of Slaughter to LA 10 west of Clinton. Though signed in the field, the concurrency with LA 412 at its southern end is not counted in the official route mileage, resulting in a slightly shorter figure of 17.11 miles (27.54 km).

The entire highway is in East Feliciana Parish.

Location	mi	km	Destinations	Notes
			LA 964 – Plains, Baton Rouge; LA 412	Southern terminus of LA 964; western terminus of LA 412; south end of LA 412 concurrency
0.490-mile (0.789 km) concurrency with LA 412 not counted in route mileage
	0.000	0.000	LA 412 east	North end of LA 412 concurrency
Ethel	6.222	10.013	LA 19 south – Baton Rouge	South end of LA 19 concurrency
	7.122	11.462	LA 19 north – Wilson	North end of LA 19 concurrency
	10.736	17.278	LA 957 south	Northern terminus of LA 957
	17.110	27.536	LA 10 – Clinton, Jackson	Northern terminus
1.000 mi = 1.609 km; 1.000 km = 0.621 mi: Concurrency terminus

== Louisiana Highway 956 ==
Louisiana Highway 956
- Location: East Feliciana Parish
- Length: 3.965 mi (6.381 km)
- Existed: 1955–present

Louisiana Highway 956 (LA 956) runs 3.97 miles (6.39 km) in a general north–south direction from LA 412 east of Slaughter to LA 19 in Ethel. The route's mileposts increase from the northern end contrary to common practice.

The entire highway is in East Feliciana Parish.

Location	mi	km	Destinations	Notes
	3.965	6.381	LA 412 – Slaughter, Olive Branch	Southern terminus
Ethel	0.000	0.000	LA 19 – Wilson, Baton Rouge	Northern terminus
1.000 mi = 1.609 km; 1.000 km = 0.621 mi

== Louisiana Highway 957 ==
Louisiana Highway 957
- Location: East Feliciana Parish
- Length: 2.720 mi (4.377 km)
- Existed: 1955–present

Louisiana Highway 957 (LA 957) runs 2.72 miles (4.38 km) in a north–south direction from LA 412 to LA 955 northeast of Slaughter.

The entire route is in East Feliciana Parish.

mi	km	Destinations	Notes
0.000	0.000	LA 412 – Slaughter, Olive Branch	Southern terminus
2.720	4.377	LA 955	Northern terminus
1.000 mi = 1.609 km; 1.000 km = 0.621 mi

== Louisiana Highway 958 ==
Louisiana Highway 958
- Location: East Feliciana Parish
- Length: 3.736 mi (6.013 km)
- Existed: 1955–present

Louisiana Highway 958 (LA 958) runs 3.74 miles (6.02 km) in a north–south direction from the East Baton Rouge Parish line to a junction with LA 959 east of Slaughter, East Feliciana Parish. The route's mileposts increase from the northern end contrary to common practice.

Parish	Location	mi	km	Destinations	Notes
East Baton Rouge–East Feliciana parish line		3.736	6.013	Begin state maintenance on Cook Road	Southern terminus
East Feliciana		0.000	0.000	LA 959 – Blairstown, Bluff Creek	Northern terminus
1.000 mi = 1.609 km; 1.000 km = 0.621 mi

== Louisiana Highway 959 ==
Louisiana Highway 959
- Location: East Feliciana Parish
- Length: 9.991 mi (16.079 km)
- Existed: 1955–present

Louisiana Highway 959 (LA 959) runs 9.99 miles (16.08 km) in an east–west direction from LA 67 northeast of Olive Branch to LA 63 northwest of Bluff Creek.

The entire highway is in East Feliciana Parish.

Location	mi	km	Destinations	Notes
	0.000	0.000	LA 67 – Clinton, Baton Rouge	Western terminus
	0.334	0.538	LA 958	Northern terminus of LA 958
Blairstown	4.753	7.649	LA 409	Northern terminus of LA 409
	9.991	16.079	LA 63 – Clinton, Greensburg	Eastern terminus
1.000 mi = 1.609 km; 1.000 km = 0.621 mi

== Louisiana Highway 960 ==
Louisiana Highway 960
- Location: East Feliciana Parish
- Length: 5.011 mi (8.064 km)
- Existed: 1955–present

Louisiana Highway 960 (LA 960) runs 5.01 miles (8.06 km) in a north–south direction from LA 63 at Bluff Creek to a local road south of Hatchersville.

It is an undivided two-lane highway for its entire length.

The entire highway is in East Feliciana Parish.

Location	mi	km	Destinations	Notes
Bluff Creek	0.000	0.000	LA 63 – Clinton, Greensburg	Southern terminus
	5.011	8.064	End state maintenance north of Three Knotch Road	Northern terminus
1.000 mi = 1.609 km; 1.000 km = 0.621 mi

== Louisiana Highway 961 ==
Louisiana Highway 961
- Location: East Feliciana Parish
- Length: 2.519 mi (4.054 km)
- Existed: 1955–present

Louisiana Highway 961 (LA 961) runs 2.52 miles (4.06 km) in a southwest to northeast direction from LA 10 to a local road northeast of Clinton.

It is an undivided two-lane highway for its entire length.

The entire route is in East Feliciana Parish.

mi	km	Destinations	Notes
0.000	0.000	LA 10 – Clinton, Greensburg	Southern terminus
2.519	4.054	End state maintenance east of Sandy Creek bridge	Northern terminus
1.000 mi = 1.609 km; 1.000 km = 0.621 mi

== Louisiana Highway 962 ==
Louisiana Highway 962
- Location: East Feliciana Parish
- Length: 2.4 mi (3.9 km)
- Existed: 1955–1963

Louisiana Highway 962 (LA 962) ran 2.4 miles (3.9 km) in a southeast to northwest direction from LA 67 to a local road west of Woodland.

The entire route was in East Feliciana Parish.

mi	km	Destinations	Notes
0.0	0.0	LA 67 – Clinton, Liberty	Southern terminus
2.4	3.9	End state maintenance west of Pretty Creek bridge	Northern terminus
1.000 mi = 1.609 km; 1.000 km = 0.621 mi

== Louisiana Highway 963 ==
Louisiana Highway 963
- Location: East Feliciana Parish
- Length: 5.402 mi (8.694 km)
- Existed: 1955–present

Louisiana Highway 963 (LA 963) runs 5.40 miles (8.69 km) in an east–west direction from LA 68 northeast of Jackson to LA 10 west of Clinton.

The entire route is in East Feliciana Parish.

mi	km	Destinations	Notes
0.000	0.000	LA 68 – Wilson, Jackson	Western terminus
2.646	4.258	LA 19 – Wilson, Baton Rouge	
5.402	8.694	LA 10 – Clinton, Jackson	Eastern terminus
1.000 mi = 1.609 km; 1.000 km = 0.621 mi

== Louisiana Highway 964 ==
Louisiana Highway 964
- Location: Alsen–Riddle
- Length: 19.100 mi (30.738 km)
- Existed: 1955–present

Louisiana Highway 964 (LA 964) runs 15.28 miles (24.59 km) in a general southeast to northwest direction from US 61 north of Baton Rouge, East Baton Rouge Parish to a local road at Riddle, West Feliciana Parish. As of 2024, all of LA 964 is under agreement to be removed from the state highway system and transferred to local control.

Parish	Location	mi	km	Destinations	Notes
East Baton Rouge		0.000– 0.245	0.000– 0.394	US 61 (Samuels Road) – Baton Rouge, St. Francisville	Southern terminus
East Baton Rouge	Zachary	5.359– 5.369	8.624– 8.641	LA 64 east (Church Street) – Zachary	Western terminus of LA 64
East Feliciana		11.113	17.885	LA 412 / LA 955	Western terminus of LA 412; southern terminus of LA 955
East Feliciana		11.765	18.934	LA 68 – Wilson	
East Feliciana		14.367	23.121	LA 954	Northern terminus of LA 954
East Feliciana		15.264– 15.277	24.565– 24.586	US 61 south – Baton Rouge	South end of US 61 concurrency
West Feliciana		15.877– 15.890	25.552– 25.572	US 61 north – St. Francisville	North end of US 61 concurrency
West Feliciana	Riddle	19.100	30.738	End state maintenance at Hood Container of Louisiana entrance gate	Northern terminus
1.000 mi = 1.609 km; 1.000 km = 0.621 mi: Concurrency terminus

== Louisiana Highway 965 ==
Louisiana Highway 965
- Location: West Feliciana Parish
- Length: 9.669 mi (15.561 km)
- Existed: 1955–present

Louisiana Highway 965 (LA 965) runs 9.67 miles (15.56 km) in a southwest to northeast direction from a local road southeast of St. Francisville to LA 10 west of Jackson.

The entire route is in West Feliciana Parish.

mi	km	Destinations	Notes
0.000	0.000	Begin state maintenance on Powell Station Road	Western terminus
2.188– 2.202	3.521– 3.544	US 61 north – St. Francisville	South end of US 61 concurrency
2.362– 2.377	3.801– 3.825	US 61 south – Baton Rouge	North end of US 61 concurrency
7.088	11.407	LA 966	Northern terminus of LA 966
9.669	15.561	LA 10 – Jackson, St. Francisville	Eastern terminus
1.000 mi = 1.609 km; 1.000 km = 0.621 mi: Concurrency terminus

== Louisiana Highway 966 ==
Louisiana Highway 966
- Location: West Feliciana Parish
- Length: 6.720 mi (10.815 km)
- Existed: 1955–present

Louisiana Highway 966 (LA 966) runs 6.72 miles (10.81 km) in a southwest to northeast direction from US 61 to LA 965 east of St. Francisville.

The entire route is in West Feliciana Parish.

mi	km	Destinations	Notes
0.000– 0.014	0.000– 0.023	US 61 – St. Francisville, Baton Rouge	Western terminus
6.720	10.815	LA 965	Eastern terminus
1.000 mi = 1.609 km; 1.000 km = 0.621 mi

== Louisiana Highway 967 ==
Louisiana Highway 967
- Location: West Feliciana Parish
- Length: 5.311 mi (8.547 km)
- Existed: 1955–present

Louisiana Highway 967 (LA 967) runs 5.311 miles (8.547 km) in a north–south direction from LA 421 northeast of Spillman to the Mississippi state line north of Cornor.

It is an undivided two-lane highway for its entire length.

The entire route is in West Feliciana Parish.

mi	km	Destinations	Notes
0.000	0.000	LA 421 – Spillman, Jackson	Southern terminus
5.311	8.547	End state maintenance at Jackson Louisiana Road	Northern terminus; continuation in Mississippi
1.000 mi = 1.609 km; 1.000 km = 0.621 mi

== Louisiana Highway 968 ==
Louisiana Highway 968
- Location: West Feliciana Parish
- Length: 0.617 mi (993 m)
- Existed: 1955–present

Louisiana Highway 968 (LA 968) runs 0.62 miles (1.00 km) in a southwest to northeast direction from a local road to LA 66 south of Weyanoke. The route's mileposts increase from the northern or eastern end contrary to common practice.

It is an undivided two-lane highway for its entire length.

The entire route is in West Feliciana Parish.

mi	km	Destinations	Notes
0.617	0.993	Begin state maintenance on Highland Road	Western terminus
0.000	0.000	LA 66 (Tunica Trace) – Angola	Eastern terminus
1.000 mi = 1.609 km; 1.000 km = 0.621 mi

== Louisiana Highway 969 ==
Louisiana Highway 969
- Location: West Feliciana Parish
- Length: 1.307 mi (2.103 km)
- Existed: 1955–present

Louisiana Highway 969 (LA 969) runs 1.31 miles (2.11 km) in a north–south direction from LA 66 to the Mississippi state line northwest of Weyanoke.

It is an undivided two-lane highway for its entire length.

The entire route is in West Feliciana Parish.

mi	km	Destinations	Notes
0.000	0.000	LA 66 (Tunica Trace) – Angola	Southern terminus
1.307	2.103	End state maintenance at Pinckneyville Road	Northern terminus; continuation in Mississippi
1.000 mi = 1.609 km; 1.000 km = 0.621 mi

== Louisiana Highway 970 ==
Louisiana Highway 970
- Location: Pointe Coupee Parish
- Length: 9.447 mi (15.203 km)
- Existed: 1955–present

Louisiana Highway 970 (LA 970) runs 9.45 miles (15.21 km) in a southwest to northeast direction from LA 417 at Jacoby to LA 418 northwest of Torras.

The entire highway is in Pointe Coupee Parish.

Location	mi	km	Destinations	Notes
Jacoby	0.000	0.000	LA 417	Southern terminus
Keller	4.899	7.884	LA 1 – Simmesport, Morganza; LA 15	Southern terminus of LA 15; south end of LA 15 concurrency
	7.459	12.004	LA 15 north – Old River Locks	North end of LA 15 concurrency
	9.447	15.203	LA 418	Northern terminus
1.000 mi = 1.609 km; 1.000 km = 0.621 mi: Concurrency terminus

== Louisiana Highway 971 ==
Louisiana Highway 971
- Location: Lettsworth–Williamsport
- Length: 3.874 mi (6.235 km)
- Existed: 1955–present

Louisiana Highway 971 (LA 971) runs 3.87 miles (6.23 km) in a northwest to southeast direction from LA 1 at Lettsworth to LA 418 at Williamsport.

It is an undivided two-lane highway for its entire length.

The entire highway is in Pointe Coupee Parish.

Location	mi	km	Destinations	Notes
Lettsworth	0.000	0.000	LA 1 – Simmesport, Morganza	Western terminus
Williamsport	3.874	6.235	LA 418	Eastern terminus
1.000 mi = 1.609 km; 1.000 km = 0.621 mi

== Louisiana Highway 972 ==
Louisiana Highway 972
- Location: Lacour Spur–Lacour
- Length: 2.266 mi (3.647 km)
- Existed: 1955–present

Louisiana Highway 972 (LA 972) runs 2.27 miles (3.65 km) in a southwest to northeast direction from LA 1 at Lacour Spur to LA 419 at Lacour.

It is an undivided two-lane highway for its entire length.

Prior to the 1955 Louisiana Highway renumbering, LA 972 was designated as State Route C-1372.

The entire highway is in Pointe Coupee Parish.

Location	mi	km	Destinations	Notes
Lacour Spur	0.000	0.000	LA 1 (Gayden Road) – Morganza, Simmesport	Western terminus
Lacour	2.266	3.647	LA 419	Eastern terminus
1.000 mi = 1.609 km; 1.000 km = 0.621 mi

== Louisiana Highway 973 ==
Louisiana Highway 973
- Location: Pointe Coupee Parish
- Length: 1.120 mi (1.802 km)
- Existed: 1955–present

Louisiana Highway 973 (LA 973) runs 1.12 miles (1.80 km) in a north–south direction along Ben Sterling Road from a point near the Morganza Spillway levee to a junction with LA 417 south of Quinton. The route's mileposts increase from the northern end contrary to common practice.

The entire route is in Pointe Coupee Parish.

mi	km	Destinations	Notes
1.120	1.802	Begin state maintenance on Ben Sterling Road	Southern terminus
0.000	0.000	LA 417	Northern terminus
1.000 mi = 1.609 km; 1.000 km = 0.621 mi

== Louisiana Highway 974 ==
Louisiana Highway 974
- Location: Pointe Coupee Parish
- Length: 0.8 mi (1,300 m)
- Existed: 1955–c. 1959

Louisiana Highway 974 (LA 974) ran 0.8 miles (1.3 km) in a north–south direction from a dead end to a junction with LA 10 west of Morganza.

The entire route was in Pointe Coupee Parish.

mi	km	Destinations	Notes
0.0	0.0	Dead end	Southern terminus
0.8	1.3	LA 10 – Morganza, Melville	Northern terminus
1.000 mi = 1.609 km; 1.000 km = 0.621 mi

== Louisiana Highway 975 ==
Louisiana Highway 975
- Location: Atchafalaya Basin
- Length: 17.897 mi (28.802 km)
- Existed: 1955–present

Louisiana Highway 975 (LA 975) runs 17.90 miles (28.81 km) in a north–south direction primarily along the Atchafalaya River levee from a point south of I-10 in Iberville Parish to an interchange with US 190 in Pointe Coupee Parish opposite Krotz Springs.

== Louisiana Highway 976 ==
Louisiana Highway 976
- Location: Blanks
- Length: 0.617 mi (993 m)
- Existed: 1955–present

Louisiana Highway 976 (LA 976) runs 0.62 miles (1.00 km) in a north–south direction from LA 81 to US 190 in an area west of Livonia known as Blanks.

It is an undivided two-lane highway for its entire length.

The entire highway is in Blanks, Pointe Coupee Parish.

mi	km	Destinations	Notes
0.000	0.000	LA 81	Southern terminus
0.612– 0.617	0.985– 0.993	US 190 (Airline Highway) – Baton Rouge, Opelousas	Northern terminus
1.000 mi = 1.609 km; 1.000 km = 0.621 mi

== Louisiana Highway 977 ==
Louisiana Highway 977
- Location: Maringouin–Valverda
- Length: 4.663 mi (7.504 km)
- Existed: 1955–present

Louisiana Highway 977 (LA 977) runs 4.66 miles (7.50 km) in a north–south direction from LA 411 east of Maringouin, Iberville Parish to LA 77 south of Livonia, Pointe Coupee Parish. The route has an anomaly in which the mileposts are reversed from the line of travel for the southernmost portion between LA 411 and LA 77 at Maringouin.

LA 977 is an undivided two-lane highway for its entire length.

Parish	Location	mi	km	Destinations	Notes
Iberville		0.094	0.151	LA 411	Southern terminus
Iberville	Maringouin	0.088– 0.039	0.142– 0.063	Bridge over Bayou Grosse Tete	
Iberville	Maringouin	0.000	0.000	LA 77 (Landry Drive) – Maringouin, Rosedale	
Route mileage reverses at LA 77 and increases from 0.094-mile (0.151 km) point
Pointe Coupee	Valverda	4.663	7.504	LA 77 – Livonia, Maringouin	Northern terminus
1.000 mi = 1.609 km; 1.000 km = 0.621 mi

== Louisiana Highway 978 ==
Louisiana Highway 978
- Location: Torbert–Oscar
- Length: 4.674 mi (7.522 km)
- Existed: 1955–present

Louisiana Highway 978 (LA 978) runs 4.67 miles (7.52 km) in a north–south direction along Bigman Lane from US 190 east of Livonia to LA 1 in Oscar.

The route's local name recalls Isaac Bigman, a plantation owner from the early 1900s. Bigman owned a plantation at the end of present-day LA 978 and was also a local merchant in the area. LA 978 is an undivided two-lane highway for its entire length.

The entire highway is in Pointe Coupee Parish.

Location	mi	km	Destinations	Notes
Torbert	0.000	0.000	US 190 (Airline Highway) – Baton Rouge, Opelousas	Southern terminus
	1.110	1.786	LA 979	Eastern terminus of LA 979
Oscar	4.674	7.522	LA 1 – Lakeland, New Roads	Northern terminus
1.000 mi = 1.609 km; 1.000 km = 0.621 mi

== Louisiana Highway 979 ==
Louisiana Highway 979
- Location: Pointe Coupee Parish
- Length: 2.527 mi (4.067 km)
- Existed: 1955–present

Louisiana Highway 979 (LA 979) runs 2.53 miles (4.07 km) in an east–west direction from LA 78 north of Livonia to LA 978 east of Livonia.

It is an undivided two-lane highway for its entire length.

The entire highway is in Pointe Coupee Parish.

Location	mi	km	Destinations	Notes
Frisco	0.000	0.000	LA 78 north (Parlange Lane) – False River, New Roads LA 78 south – Livonia, Opelousas	Western terminus
	2.527	4.067	LA 978 (Bigman Lane) – Torbert	Eastern terminus
1.000 mi = 1.609 km; 1.000 km = 0.621 mi

== Louisiana Highway 980 ==
Louisiana Highway 980
- Location: New Roads
- Length: 0.7 mi (1,100 m)
- Existed: 1955–1972

Louisiana Highway 980 (LA 980) ran 0.7 miles (1.1 km) in a north–south direction along West End Drive from LA 1 to a second junction with LA 1 and the concurrent LA 10 in New Roads.

The entire highway was in New Roads, Pointe Coupee Parish.

mi	km	Destinations	Notes
0.000	0.000	LA 1 (Main Street)	Southern terminus
0.7	1.1	LA 1 / LA 10 (Parent Street)	Northern terminus
1.000 mi = 1.609 km; 1.000 km = 0.621 mi

== Louisiana Highway 981 ==
Louisiana Highway 981
- Location: Waterloo–Pointe Coupee
- Length: 8.191 mi (13.182 km)
- Existed: 1955–present

Louisiana Highway 981 (LA 981) runs 8.19 miles (13.18 km) in a southeast to northwest direction from LA 415 east of New Roads to LA 420 north of New Roads.

It is an undivided two-lane highway for its entire length.

In 2011, LA 981 was extended slightly on its north end over part of LA 10 when the New Roads–St. Francisville Ferry closed due to the opening of the John James Audubon Bridge.

The entire highway is in Pointe Coupee Parish.

Location	mi	km	Destinations	Notes
Waterloo	0.000	0.000	LA 415	Southern terminus
	2.129	3.426	LA 10 – New Roads, St. Francisville	
Pointe Coupee	8.191	13.182	LA 420 (Pointe Coupee Road, Ferry Road) – New Roads	Northern terminus
1.000 mi = 1.609 km; 1.000 km = 0.621 mi

== Louisiana Highway 982 ==
Louisiana Highway 982
- Location: Arbroth–Glynn
- Length: 2.590 mi (4.168 km)
- Existed: 1955–present

Louisiana Highway 982 (LA 982) runs 2.59 miles (4.17 km) in a southeast to northwest direction from LA 415 in Arbroth, West Baton Rouge Parish to LA 416 in Glynn, Pointe Coupee Parish.

It is an undivided two-lane highway for its entire length.

Prior to the 1955 Louisiana Highway renumbering, LA 982 was part of State Route 135.

Parish	Location	mi	km	Destinations	Notes
West Baton Rouge	Arbroth	0.000	0.000	LA 415 (North River Road)	Southern terminus
Pointe Coupee	Glynn	2.590	4.168	LA 416	Northern terminus
1.000 mi = 1.609 km; 1.000 km = 0.621 mi

== Louisiana Highway 983 ==
Louisiana Highway 983
- Location: Boudreaux Spur–Chenal
- Length: 9.304 mi (14.973 km)
- Existed: 1955–present

Louisiana Highway 983 (LA 983) runs 9.30 miles (14.97 km) in a north–south direction from the concurrent US 190/LA 1 southeast of Erwinville, West Baton Rouge Parish to LA 414 at Chenal, Pointe Coupee Parish.

Parish	Location	mi	km	Destinations	Notes
West Baton Rouge		0.000– 0.014	0.000– 0.023	US 190 (Airline Highway) / LA 1 – Baton Rouge, Opelousas	Southern terminus
West Baton Rouge		1.978	3.183	LA 620 (Section Road)	
West Baton Rouge		3.633	5.847	LA 985 (Rosehill Drive)	Western terminus of LA 985
West Baton Rouge		5.931	9.545	LA 984 east (Bueche Road)	South end of LA 984 concurrency
West Baton Rouge–Pointe Coupee parish line		6.551	10.543	LA 984 south (Rougon Road)	North end of LA 984 concurrency
Pointe Coupee		8.241	13.263	LA 416 west – Lakeland	South end of LA 416 concurrency
Pointe Coupee	Rougon	8.881	14.293	LA 416 east	North end of LA 416 concurrency
Pointe Coupee	Chenal	9.304	14.973	LA 414	Northern terminus
1.000 mi = 1.609 km; 1.000 km = 0.621 mi: Concurrency terminus

== Louisiana Highway 984 ==
Louisiana Highway 984
- Location: West Baton Rouge Parish
- Length: 6.437 mi (10.359 km)
- Existed: 1955–present

Louisiana Highway 984 (LA 984) runs 6.44 miles (10.36 km) in a southwest to northeast direction from LA 620 northeast of Erwinville to LA 415 south of Arbroth, West Baton Rouge Parish.

As of 2024, all of LA 984 is under agreement to be removed from the highway system and transferred to local control.

Parish	Location	mi	km	Destinations	Notes
West Baton Rouge		0.000	0.000	LA 620 (Section Road)	Southwestern terminus
West Baton Rouge–Pointe Coupee parish line		2.986	4.806	LA 983 north (Rougon Road) – Rougon	South end of LA 983 concurrency
West Baton Rouge		3.616	5.819	LA 983 south (Bueche Road) – Bueche	North end of LA 983 concurrency
West Baton Rouge		6.437	10.359	LA 415 (North River Road)	Northeastern terminus
1.000 mi = 1.609 km; 1.000 km = 0.621 mi: Concurrency terminus

== Louisiana Highway 985 ==
Louisiana Highway 985
- Location: West Baton Rouge Parish
- Length: 1.223 mi (1.968 km)
- Existed: 1955–present

Louisiana Highway 985 (LA 985) runs 1.22 miles (1.96 km) in a southwest to northeast direction along Rosehill Drive from LA 983 southeast of Bueche to LA 415 at Alfords.

It is an undivided, two-lane highway for its entire length.

Prior to the 1955 Louisiana Highway renumbering, LA 985 was part of State Route C-1408.

As of 2024, all of LA 985 is under agreement to be removed from the highway system and transferred to local control.

The entire highway is in West Baton Rouge Parish.

Location	mi	km	Destinations	Notes
	0.000	0.000	LA 983 (Bueche Road)	Western terminus
Alfords	1.223	1.968	LA 415 (North River Road)	Eastern terminus
1.000 mi = 1.609 km; 1.000 km = 0.621 mi

== Louisiana Highway 986 ==
Louisiana Highway 986
- Location: West Baton Rouge Parish
- Length: 9.346 mi (15.041 km)
- Existed: 1955–present

Louisiana Highway 986 (LA 986) runs 9.346 miles (15.041 km) in a general north–south direction, making a loop from the junction of LA 76 and LA 415 west of Port Allen to a second junction with LA 415 north of Lobdell.

As of 2024, all of LA 986 is under agreement to be removed from the highway system and transferred to local control.

The entire highway is in West Baton Rouge Parish.

Location	mi	km	Destinations	Notes
	0.000– 0.011	0.000– 0.018	LA 76 / LA 415 (Rosedale Road, Lobdell Highway)	Southern terminus
Port Allen	2.308– 2.317	3.714– 3.729	LA 1 (North Alexander Avenue)	
	3.457	5.564	LA 987-3 (Lafiton Lane)	Eastern terminus of LA 987-3
	5.783	9.307	LA 987-1 (Bridgeside Road)	Eastern terminus of LA 987-1
	9.346	15.041	LA 415 (North River Road, Plantation Avenue)	Northern terminus
1.000 mi = 1.609 km; 1.000 km = 0.621 mi

== Louisiana Highway 987 ==
Louisiana Highway 987
- Location: Port Allen
- Length: 4.676 mi (7.525 km)
- Existed: 1955–present

Louisiana Highway 987 (LA 987) currently consists of five road segments with a total length of 4.68 miles (7.53 km) that are located in the city of Port Allen and an unincorporated area of West Baton Rouge Parish to the north. Since its creation, the system has been altered on three occasions. LA 987-5 and LA 987-6 were deleted in 1972. LA 987-3 Spur was added in 2001 and deleted in 2013. One of the original segments, LA 987-2, was deleted in 2015.

- LA 987-1 runs 0.21 miles (0.34 km) along Bridgeside Road from LA 1 to LA 986 (North River Road).
- LA 987-2 ran 0.58 miles (0.93 km) along Faye Avenue from LA 1 to LA 986 (North River Road).
- LA 987-3 runs 2.94 miles (4.73 km) along Lafiton Lane from LA 415 (Lobdell Highway) to LA 986 (North River Road).
- LA 987-3 Spur ran 0.12 miles (0.19 km) along Lafiton Lane from LA 415 (Lobdell Highway) to LA 987-3 (Plantation Avenue Loop).
- LA 987-4 runs 0.50 miles (0.80 km) along Court Street from LA 1 (Alexander Avenue) to LA 987-5 (South River Road).
- LA 987-5 ran 0.57 miles (0.92 km) along Oaks Avenue and South River Road from LA 987-6 (South Jefferson Avenue) to LA 987-4 (Court Street).
- LA 987-6 ran 0.45 miles (0.72 km) along South Jefferson Avenue from LA 987-5 (Oaks Avenue) to LA 987-4 (Court Street).

As of 2024, all of LA 987-1, LA 987-3 and LA 987-4 are under agreement to be removed from the highway system and transferred to local control.

== Louisiana Highway 988 ==
Louisiana Highway 988
- Location: Plaquemine–Brusly
- Length: 10.977 mi (17.666 km)
- Existed: 1955–present

Louisiana Highway 988 (LA 988) runs 10.98 miles (17.67 km) in a north–south direction from LA 1 in Plaquemine, Iberville Parish to a second junction with LA 1 south of Port Allen, West Baton Rouge Parish.

As of 2024, the section of LA 988 from LA 1 south to LA 1/LA 990 is under agreement to be removed from the highway system and transferred to local control.

Parish	Location	mi	km	Destinations	Notes
Iberville	Plaquemine	0.000– 0.008	0.000– 0.013	LA 1 – Plaquemine, Port Allen	Southern terminus
Iberville		1.124	1.809	LA 1148 (Woodlawn Road)	Eastern terminus of LA 1148
West Baton Rouge	Addis	5.725	9.213	LA 990 (Addis Lane)	Eastern terminus of LA 990
West Baton Rouge		7.280	11.716	LA 989-1 (Lukeville Lane)	Eastern terminus of LA 989-1
West Baton Rouge	Brusly	8.014	12.897	LA 989-2 (East Main Street)	Eastern terminus of LA 989-2
West Baton Rouge		10.965– 10.977	17.646– 17.666	LA 1 – Port Allen, Plaquemine	Northern terminus
1.000 mi = 1.609 km; 1.000 km = 0.621 mi

== Louisiana Highway 989 ==
Louisiana Highway 989
- Location: Brusly
- Length: 7.425 mi (11.949 km)
- Existed: 1955–present

Louisiana Highway 989 (LA 989) consists of two road segments with a total length of 7.43 miles (11.96 km) that are located in the West Baton Rouge Parish town of Brusly and an unincorporated area between Brusly and the neighboring town of Addis.

- LA 989-1 runs 5.43 miles (8.74 km) along Choctaw Road and Lukeville Lane from a dead end at the Gulf Intracoastal Waterway to a junction with LA 988.
- LA 989-2 runs 2.00 miles (3.22 km) along Choctaw Road, South Labauve Avenue, and Main Street from LA 989-1 to LA 988.

As of 2024, all of LA 989-1 and LA 989-2 are under agreement to be removed from the highway system and transferred to local control.

== Louisiana Highway 990 ==
Louisiana Highway 990
- Location: Addis
- Length: 0.562 mi (904 m)
- Existed: 1955–present

Louisiana Highway 990 (LA 990) runs 1.07 miles (1.72 km) in an east–west direction from LA 1 to a junction with LA 988 in Addis.

LA 990 is an undivided two-lane highway for its entire length. The route's mileposts increase from the eastern end contrary to common practice.

Prior to the 1955 Louisiana Highway renumbering, LA 990 was designated as State Route 133.

By 2024, the portion of LA 990 west of LA 1 had been removed from the state highway system and transferred to local control.

The entire highway is in Addis, West Baton Rouge Parish.

mi	km	Destinations	Notes
0.562– 0.550	0.904– 0.885	LA 1 – Plaquemine, Port Allen	
0.000	0.000	LA 988 (South River Road)	Eastern terminus
1.000 mi = 1.609 km; 1.000 km = 0.621 mi

== Louisiana Highway 991 ==
Louisiana Highway 991
- Location: Iberville Parish
- Length: 5.904 mi (9.502 km)
- Existed: 1955–present

Louisiana Highway 991 (LA 991) runs 5.90 miles (9.50 km) in a southwest to northeast direction from LA 75 east of Plaquemine to LA 327 in St. Gabriel.

As of 2022, all of LA 991 is under agreement to be removed from the highway system and transferred to local control.

The entire highway is in Iberville Parish.

Location	mi	km	Destinations	Notes
	0.000	0.000	LA 75 – Plaquemine Ferry, St. Gabriel	Southern terminus
St. Gabriel	5.744– 5.904	9.244– 9.502	LA 327 (Gummers Lane, River Road)	Northern terminus
1.000 mi = 1.609 km; 1.000 km = 0.621 mi

== Louisiana Highway 992 ==
Louisiana Highway 992
- Location: Plaquemine
- Length: 2.722 mi (4.381 km)
- Existed: 1955–present

Louisiana Highway 992 (LA 992) currently consists of one road segment with a total length of 2.72 miles (4.38 km) that is located in and near the Iberville Parish city of Plaquemine. Two of the original three segments were deleted from the state highway system between 1960 and 1970.

- LA 992-1 ran 0.2 miles (0.32 km) from LA 1 to LA 77 (Bayou Jacob Road).
- LA 992-2 ran 2.4 miles (3.9 km) along Pecan Boulevard from LA 1 to a point near the present junction of LA 75 and LA 992-3.
- LA 992-3 runs 2.72 miles (4.38 km) along St. Louis Road and Tenant Road from LA 1 to LA 75.

As of 2022, all of LA 992-3 is under agreement to be removed from the highway system and transferred to local control.

== Louisiana Highway 993 ==
Louisiana Highway 993
- Location: Iberville Parish
- Length: 7.104 mi (11.433 km)
- Existed: 1955–present

Louisiana Highway 993 (LA 993) runs 7.104 miles (11.433 km) in a southwest to northeast direction from a local road in Lone Star to the concurrent LA 69/LA 405 west of White Castle.

As of 2022, all of LA 993 is under agreement to be removed from the highway system and transferred to local control.

The entire highway is in Iberville Parish.

Location	mi	km	Destinations	Notes
Lone Star	0.000	0.000	Begin state maintenance on Lone Star Road	Southern terminus
Goldridge	2.330	3.750	LA 3001	Southern terminus of LA 3001
	2.964	4.770	LA 404	
	4.475	7.202	LA 994 (Ourso Road)	Eastern terminus of LA 994
	6.917– 6.934	11.132– 11.159	LA 1 – Plaquemine, Donaldsonville	
	7.104	11.433	LA 69 / LA 405	Northern terminus
1.000 mi = 1.609 km; 1.000 km = 0.621 mi

== Louisiana Highway 994 ==
Louisiana Highway 994
- Location: Iberville Parish
- Length: 1.171 mi (1.885 km)
- Existed: 1955–present

Louisiana Highway 994 (LA 994) runs 1.17 miles (1.88 km) in an east–west direction along Ourso Road from the intersection of two local roads to LA 993 southwest of White Castle.

As of 2022, all of LA 994 is under agreement to be removed from the highway system and transferred to local control.

The entire highway is in Iberville Parish.

Location	mi	km	Destinations	Notes
Brusly La Croix	0.000	0.000	Begin state maintenance at intersection of Ourso Road and Ridge Road	Western terminus
	1.171	1.885	LA 993 (Richland Road)	Eastern terminus
1.000 mi = 1.609 km; 1.000 km = 0.621 mi

== Louisiana Highway 995 ==
Louisiana Highway 995
- Location: Iberville Parish
- Length: 2.833 mi (4.559 km)
- Existed: 1955–present

Louisiana Highway 995 (LA 995) runs 2.83 miles (4.55 km) in a general east–west direction from LA 69 to a private road south of White Castle.

As of 2022, all of LA 995 is under agreement to be removed from the highway system and transferred to local control.

The entire highway is in Iberville Parish.

Location	mi	km	Destinations	Notes
	0.000	0.000	LA 69 – White Castle, Grand Bayou	Western terminus
Annadale	2.833	4.559	End state maintenance at private road	Eastern terminus
1.000 mi = 1.609 km; 1.000 km = 0.621 mi

== Louisiana Highway 996 ==
Louisiana Highway 996
- Location: Assumption Parish
- Length: 6.013 mi (9.677 km)
- Existed: 1955–present

Louisiana Highway 996 (LA 996) runs 6.01 miles (9.67 km) in a general southeast to northwest direction from LA 70 east of Grand Bayou, Assumption Parish to LA 69 north of the Iberville Parish line.

Parish	Location	mi	km	Destinations	Notes
Assumption		0.000	0.000	LA 70 – Pierre Part, Donaldsonville	Southern terminus
Assumption		2.437	3.922	LA 1000	Western terminus of LA 1000
Assumption	Brusly St. Martin	2.934	4.722	LA 1001 (Dugas Road)	Northwestern terminus of LA 1001
Iberville		6.013	9.677	LA 69 – Grand Bayou, White Castle	Northern terminus
1.000 mi = 1.609 km; 1.000 km = 0.621 mi

== Louisiana Highway 997 ==
Louisiana Highway 997
- Location: Belle River–Bayou Pigeon
- Length: 13.048 mi (20.999 km)
- Existed: 1955–present

Louisiana Highway 997 (LA 997) runs 13.4 miles (21.6 km) in a north–south direction from LA 70 in an area of St. Martin west of Belle River to LA 75 in Bayou Pigeon, Iberville Parish. The route's mileposts increase from the northern end contrary to common practice. Due to an anomaly in the official route log, portions of LA 997 are assigned to the mileage of LA 70 and LA 75, resulting in a slightly shorter figure of 13.05 miles (21.00 km).

As of 2022, all of LA 997 is under agreement to be removed from the highway system and transferred to local control.

Parish	Location	mi	km	Destinations	Notes
St. Martin		13.4	21.6	LA 70 – Pierre Part, Morgan City	Southern terminus
Iberia	No major junctions				
Iberville	Bayou Pigeon	0.1	0.16	Bridge over Lower Grand River	
Iberville	Bayou Pigeon	0.0	0.0	LA 75 – Bayou Sorrel	Northern terminus
1.000 mi = 1.609 km; 1.000 km = 0.621 mi

== Louisiana Highway 998 ==
Louisiana Highway 998
- Location: Assumption Parish
- Length: 0.865 mi (1,392 m)
- Existed: 1955–present

Louisiana Highway 998 (LA 998) runs 0.87 miles (1.40 km) in a northwest to southeast direction from a local road to LA 308 north of Paincourtville. The route's mileposts increase from the eastern end contrary to common practice.

As of 2022, all of LA 998 is under agreement to be removed from the highway system and transferred to local control.

The entire highway is in Assumption Parish.

Location	mi	km	Destinations	Notes
	0.865	1.392	Begin state maintenance at Union Pacific Railroad track	Western terminus
Belle Rose	0.093	0.150	LA 1 – Donaldsonville, Napoleonville	
Belle Rose	0.073– 0.019	0.117– 0.031	Bridge over Bayou Lafourche	
	0.000	0.000	LA 308	Eastern terminus
1.000 mi = 1.609 km; 1.000 km = 0.621 mi

== Louisiana Highway 999 ==
Louisiana Highway 999
- Location: Assumption Parish
- Length: 1.290 mi (2.076 km)
- Existed: 1955–present

Louisiana Highway 999 (LA 999) runs 1.29 miles (2.08 km) in a northwest to southeast direction along Lula Road from the Lula Sugar Factory to a junction with LA 1 north of Paincourtville. The route's mileposts increase from the eastern end contrary to common practice.

As of 2022, all of LA 999 is under agreement to be removed from the highway system and transferred to local control.

The entire route is in Assumption Parish.

mi	km	Destinations	Notes
1.290	2.076	Begin state maintenance on Lula Road	Western terminus
0.000	0.000	LA 1 – Donaldsonville, Napoleonville	Eastern terminus
1.000 mi = 1.609 km; 1.000 km = 0.621 mi
