= Louisiana Highway 19 =

Highway in Louisiana

Louisiana Highway 19

- Route of LA 19 highlighted in red

Route information
- Maintained by Louisiana DOTD
- Length: 33.93 mi (54.61 km)
- Existed: 1955 renumbering–present

Major junctions
- South end: US 61 in Baton Rouge
- I-110 in Baton Rouge; LA 10 east of Jackson
- North end: MS 33 at Mississippi state line north of Norwood

Location
- Country: United States
- State: Louisiana
- Parishes: East Baton Rouge, East Feliciana

Highway system
- Louisiana State Highway System; Interstate; US; State; Scenic
| ← LA 18 | → I-20 |
| ← SR 90 | 91 | → SR 92 |
| ← SR 151 | 152 | → SR 153 |

Louisiana Highway 19 (LA 19) is a state highway located in southeastern Louisiana. It runs 33.93 miles (54.61 km) in a north–south direction from U.S. Highway 61 (US 61) in Baton Rouge to the Mississippi state line north of Norwood.

The route connects a string of communities projecting northward out of Baton Rouge, the state capital, including the small suburban cities of Baker and Zachary. It traverses two of the Florida Parishes, East Baton Rouge and East Feliciana, in a nearly linear fashion as the entire route parallels a railroad line.

LA 19 has three notable junctions, two of which provide access to downtown Baton Rouge. These are US 61 and Interstate 110 (I-110) and are located within the first 1.0 mile (1.6 km) of the route on its southern end. The highway also intersects LA 10, an east–west cross-state route that connects with Jackson and Clinton, two nearby small towns of historic character. The latter is also the seat of East Feliciana Parish. The remaining junctions along LA 19 mostly serve to connect the route with the parallel US 61 and LA 67.

== Route description ==
From the south, LA 19 begins at an intersection with US 61 (Scenic Highway) north of downtown Baton Rouge. US 61 connects the city with St. Francisville and Natchez, Mississippi to the north. LA 19 laterals off of US 61 as it heads north on Scotland Avenue alongside the Canadian National Railway (CN) tracks through an area within the Baton Rouge city limits known as Scotlandville. Immediately after passing the local high school, LA 19 proceeds through a half diamond interchange with southbound I-110, which leads back to the downtown area. Here, the highway widens from a two-lane to an undivided four-lane highway. Just north of the interstate, the suburban surroundings abruptly change as LA 19 passes a series of small industrial facilities, including an ExxonMobil chemical plant. During this time, it intersects LA 423 (Thomas Road), a short connector to the parallel LA 67.

The highway enters Baker as it intersects LA 3006 (Lavey Lane), a second connector to nearby LA 67. Widening to accommodate a center turning lane, LA 19 proceeds through Baker on Main Street, its principal commercial thoroughfare. The suburb's main junction is an intersection with Groom Road, a local road that connects with LA 964 and LA 67 on either side of town. North of Baker, LA 19 passes through the small city of Zachary, where it diverges slightly from the CN railroad line for the first time. The highway intersects LA 64 (Main Street) in the center of town, connecting with US 61 to the west and the city of Central to the east. Proceeding northward from this junction, LA 19 narrows again to an undivided two-lane highway. It rejoins the CN railroad heading out of Zachary and then crosses from East Baton Rouge Parish into East Feliciana Parish.

Immediately across the parish line, LA 19 passes through the small town of Slaughter, intersecting LA 412 at Church Street. The highway proceeds northward, now following the Gloster Southern Railroad (GLSR) through more rural surroundings. About 3.5 miles (5.6 km) north of Slaughter, LA 19 passes through an area known as Ethel, where it intersects two minor state routes, LA 956 and LA 955. LA 19 turns northeast, running concurrently with the latter for a short distance before resuming its northern trajectory. Now running parallel to the railroad line at a greater distance, the highway intersects LA 10 at McManus. LA 10 connects with the nearby towns of Jackson and Clinton to the west and east, respectively. 2 miles (3.2 km) north of LA 10 is an intersection with LA 963 near a point known as Gurley.

Over its remaining 9.5 miles (15.3 km), LA 19 passes through two small villages situated along the GLSR railroad line and intersects a rural state route in each: LA 68 in Wilson and LA 422 in Norwood. Just beyond Norwood, LA 19 reaches the Mississippi state line, and the highway continues northward as Mississippi Highway 33 (MS 33) toward Centreville, where connections are made to the cities of Natchez and McComb.

=== Route classification and data ===
LA 19 is generally classified by the Louisiana Department of Transportation and Development (La DOTD) as an urban principal arterial within East Baton Rouge Parish. Daily traffic volume in 2013 peaked at 29,200 vehicles north of the I-110 interchange and decreased steadily through the suburbs of Baker and Zachary to 16,800 vehicles. Once the highway crosses into rural East Feliciana Parish at Slaughter, the figure drops off sharply, reaching an estimate of 2,200 vehicles toward the Mississippi state line.

The posted speed limit is usually 55 mph (90 km/h) in rural areas, reduced to between 35 mph (55 km/h) and 45 mph (70 km/h) through town.

== History ==
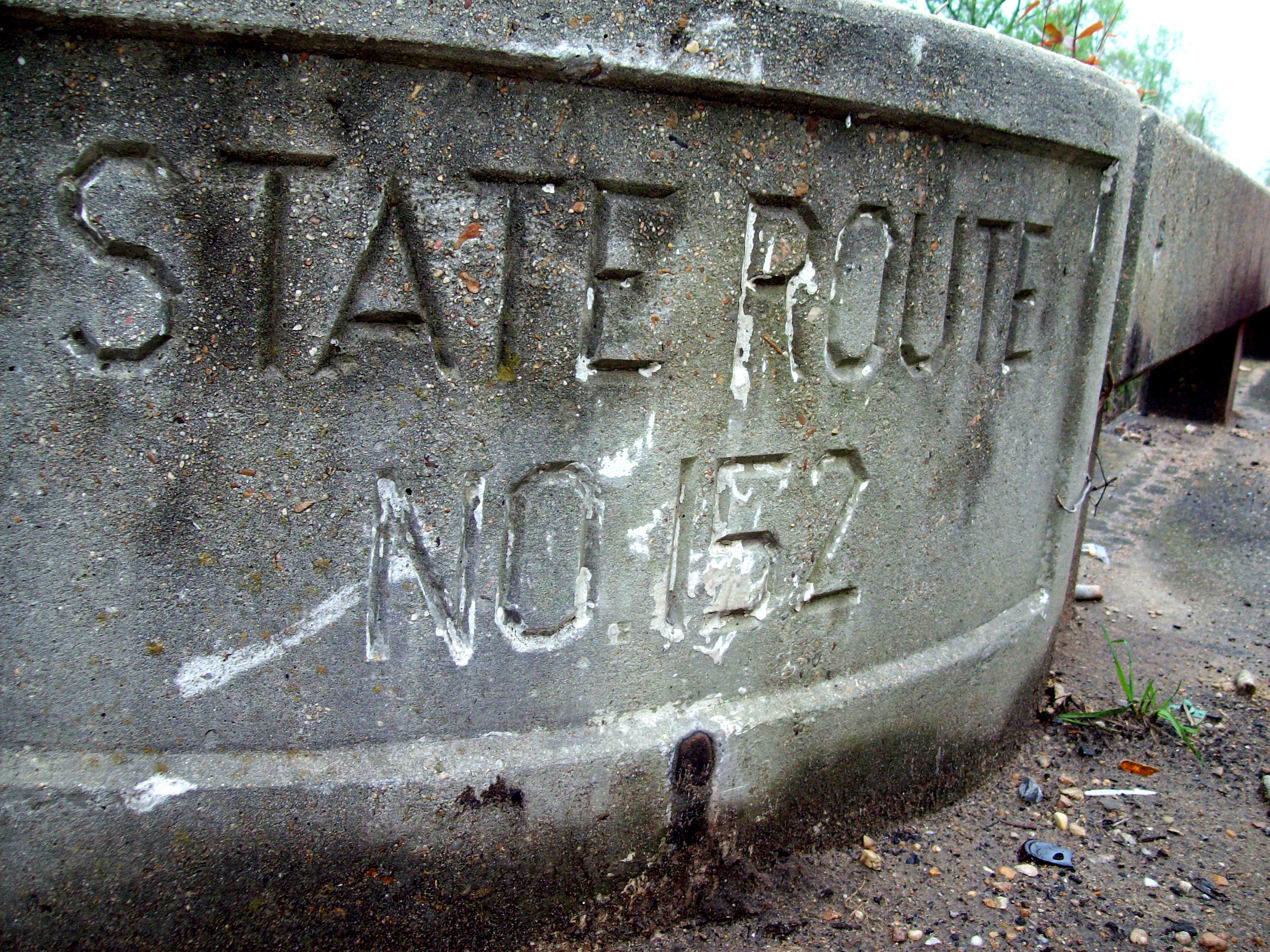
Former Route 152 designation stamped onto a bridge between Zachary and Slaughter

=== Pre-1955 route numbering ===
In the original Louisiana Highway system in use between 1921 and 1955, the modern LA 19 was part of two separate routes, State Route 91 and State Route 152.

==== Northern section ====
State Route 91
- Location: East Feliciana Parish
- Length: 20.3 mi (32.7 km)
- Existed: 1921–1955

The northern section running from Slaughter to the Mississippi state line was designated as State Route 91. It was created in 1921 by an act of the state legislature as one of the original 98 state highway routes.

Route No. 91. Beginning at Norwood along Y. & M. V. Railroad to Slaughter.

— 1921 legislative route description

Originally, the north end of the highway was in Norwood as a direct route connecting Norwood with Centerville, Mississippi appears not to have existed at the time. By 1927, Route 91 had been extended, curving northwest to closely follow what was then the Yazoo and Mississippi Valley Railroad to the Mississippi state line. Otherwise, the route remained essentially the same up to the 1955 Louisiana Highway renumbering. By this time, the Yazoo and Mississippi Valley line had been absorbed into the Illinois Central Railroad.

==== Southern section ====
State Route 152
- Location: East Baton Rouge Parish, East Feliciana Parish
- Length: 13.9 mi (22.4 km)
- Existed: 1928–1955

The remainder of present-day LA 19, consisting of the southern portion of the route between Scotlandville and Slaughter, was added to the state highway system in 1928. As was common practice by the Louisiana Highway Commission (forerunner of the La DOTD), it was designated with a different route number from the highway it continued.

Route 152. Commencing at Scotland, Louisiana in the Parish of East Baton Rouge, and running to Slaughter, East Feliciana Parish, connecting Route No. 3 of the system of State Highways at Scotland with Route No. 91 of the system of State highways at Slaughter, running approximately parallel to the line of the Y. & M. V. Ry.

— 1928 legislative route description

This route also remained largely unchanged during the pre-1955 era. The only exception was a re-alignment of the highway between Baker and Zachary sometime after 1937. This improvement eliminated two grade crossings of the Illinois Central (now the Gloster Southern) railroad tracks and streamlined the route through Zachary. The original route made a zigzag across the tracks north of Baker and followed what is now Old Baker-Zachary Road into Zachary. In the center of town, the route turned east onto Church Street back across the railroad line, then north onto East Central Avenue to rejoin the current alignment. Once bypassed, the original route was designated as State Route C-2174. The portion of this route within the Zachary city limits was retained in the 1955 renumbering as LA 1203.

=== Post-1955 route history ===
LA 19 was created in 1955 as a collective renumbering of former State Routes 91 and 152.

La 19—From a junction with La-US 61 at or near Scotlandville through or near Zachary and Slaughter to the Mississippi state line north of Norwood.

— 1955 legislative route description

The route of LA 19 has remained the same since the 1955 renumbering, although the southern terminus in Scotlandville is now within the Baton Rouge city limits. The once independent town was annexed in stages between the early 1970s and early 1980s. The biggest improvement to LA 19 since its creation has been the widening of the highway to four lanes through most of East Baton Rouge Parish. This has served to accommodate the increased traffic volume caused by the suburban outgrowth of Baton Rouge. The section between LA 423 and Baker was widened in the late 1970s and extended south to connect with the newly constructed extension of I-110 around 1982. The widening of the portion between Baker and Zachary occurred by the end of the decade.

== Major intersections ==
| Parish | Location | mi | km | Destinations | Notes |
|---|---|---|---|---|---|
| East Baton Rouge | Baton Rouge | 0.0 | 0.0 | US 61 (Scenic Highway) – Baton Rouge, Natchez | Southern terminus; location also known as Scotlandville |
| East Baton Rouge | Baton Rouge | 0.8– 1.0 | 1.3– 1.6 | I-110 south – Baton Rouge | Exit 8A on I-110 |
| East Baton Rouge | Baton Rouge | 2.5 | 4.0 | LA 423 (Thomas Road) | Western terminus of LA 423 |
| East Baton Rouge | Baker | 3.6 | 5.8 | LA 3006 (Lavey Lane) | Western terminus of LA 3006 |
| East Baton Rouge | Zachary | 8.9 | 14.3 | LA 64 (Main Street) | |
| East Feliciana | Slaughter | 13.7 | 22.0 | LA 412 (Church Street) | |
| East Feliciana | Ethel | 18.4 | 29.6 | LA 956 | Northern terminus of LA 956 |
| East Feliciana | Ethel | 18.8 | 30.3 | LA 955 west | South end of LA 955 concurrency |
| East Feliciana | | 19.7 | 31.7 | LA 955 east | North end of LA 955 concurrency |
| East Feliciana | McManus | 22.5 | 36.2 | LA 10 – Jackson, Clinton | |
| East Feliciana | | 24.6 | 39.6 | LA 963 | |
| East Feliciana | Wilson | 28.1 | 45.2 | LA 68 (Sycamore Street) | Northern terminus of LA 68 |
| East Feliciana | Norwood | 31.8 | 51.2 | LA 422 | Western terminus of LA 422 |
| East Feliciana | | 34.0 | 54.7 | MS 33 north – Centreville | Northern terminus; continuation in Mississippi |
1.000 mi = 1.609 km; 1.000 km = 0.621 mi: Concurrency terminus; Incomplete access
