= Donna Douglas =

American actress and singer (1932–2015)

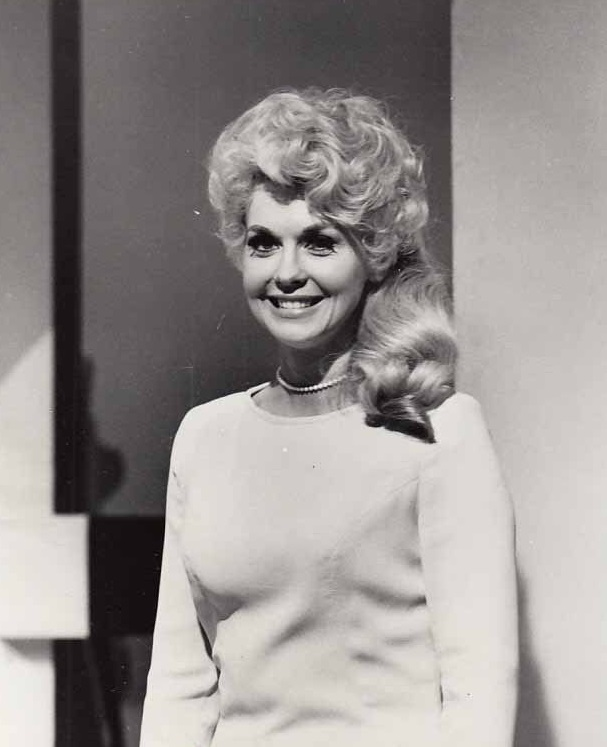
- Douglas in 1967
- Born: Doris Ione Smith; September 26, 1932; Pride, Louisiana, U.S.
- Died: January 1, 2015 (aged 82); Zachary, Louisiana, U.S.
- Resting place: Bluff Creek Community Cemetery, Bluff Creek, Louisiana
- Occupations: Actress; singer; writer; comedienne; real estate agent; inspirational speaker
- Years active: 1956–2008
- Spouses: Roland John Bourgeois Jr. (m. 1951; div. 1954); Robert M. Leeds (m. 1971; div. 1980)
- Children: 1

Donna Douglas (born Doris Ione Smith; September 26, 1932 – January 1, 2015) was an American actress and singer, known for her role as Elly May Clampett on The Beverly Hillbillies (1962–1971). Following her acting career, Douglas became a real estate agent, gospel singer, inspirational speaker, and author of books for children and adults.

== Early life ==
Douglas was born Doris Ione Smith in the community of Pride, East Baton Rouge Parish, Louisiana, on September 26, 1932. The younger of two children, she was the only daughter of Emmett Ratcliff Smith Sr., (Note: Her father's obituary, published in Baton Rouge Advocate, October 9, 1988, states: "Emmett R Smith Sr. — Died 2:30 pm Friday, October 7, 1988, near Port Allen, as the result of a boating accident. He was 81, a native of Baywood, and resident of Zachary. He was a retired Standard Oil Co. employee with 37 years service. Visiting at Galilee Baptist Church, Deerford Road, 12:30 pm to religious services at 2 pm. Sunday, conducted by the Rev. Tommy Jackson. Burial in Bluff Creek Baptist Church Cemetery, Bluff Creek....") who worked most of his life for Standard Oil, and his wife, Elma (née Robinson), a former telephone operator. (Note: Her mother's obituary, published in The Baton Rouge Advocate, January 2, 2004, states: "SMITH, ELMA ROBINSON In her early life, she was a telephone operator and was a joy and blessing to all who knew her. She died Wednesday, December 31, 2003, at 6:05 am at Zachary Manor Nursing Home. She was 93, born in Olive Branch/Clinton and a resident of Zachary. Visiting was at Charlet Funeral Home Inc., Zachary, from 5 pm to 9 pm Thursday, with recitation of the rosary at 7 pm. Visiting at St. John the Baptist Catholic Church from 10 am until service at 1 pm Friday, conducted by the Rev. Kenny Laird. Burial in St. Isidore Catholic Church Cemetery, Baker...")

Douglas attended Redemptorist High School, where she played softball and basketball, and was a member of the school's first graduating class. Douglas was named Miss Baton Rouge and Miss New Orleans in 1957.

== Career ==
Douglas moved to New York City to pursue a career in show business, and started as an illustration model for toothpaste advertisements. She was featured as the "Letters Girl" on NBC's The Perry Como Show in 1957 and as the "Billboard Girl" on NBC's The Steve Allen Show in 1959. These and other television appearances led New York photographers and newspaper reporters to award her the "Miss By-line" crown, which she wore on CBS' The Ed Sullivan Show.

Douglas appeared in a 1958 episode of The Phil Silvers Show "Bilko and the Crosbys" credited as Doris Bourgeois, her given name and her married name from her first marriage.

Hal B. Wallis saw the Sullivan episode and cast her in the role of Marjorie Burke in the movie drama Career (1959), starring Anthony Franciosa, Dean Martin, and Shirley MacLaine. This was followed by a bit part in the musical comedy Li'l Abner (1959) and the role of a secretary in the comedy/romance Lover Come Back (1961), starring Rock Hudson and Doris Day.

She made numerous television appearances in the late 1950s and early 1960s, including The Twilight Zone episode "Eye of the Beholder" (1960). She played Barbara Simmons in four 1961 episodes of the CBS detective series Checkmate. Her other credits include U.S. Marshal, Tightrope, The Adventures of Ozzie and Harriet, Bachelor Father, Adam-12, and Route 66. Douglas also appeared in Thriller, season one, episode 16, "The Hungry Glass".

=== The Beverly Hillbillies ===
Although Douglas was an active actress in the 1960s, she was still relatively unknown when selected from among 500 young actresses to work on The Beverly Hillbillies (1962–1971). Continually typecast as a result of her Hillbillies role, Douglas decided to focus on her career as a gospel singer.

During the 1966 summer hiatus of The Beverly Hillbillies, Douglas made her only starring feature-film appearance, cast as Frankie in Fred de Cordova's Frankie and Johnny (1966) with Elvis Presley. The film proved popular, but did little to advance Douglas's big-screen career.

With the 1973 death of Hillbillies co-star Irene Ryan, the 1980 death of Raymond Bailey, and Max Baer Jr.'s refusal to participate, Douglas joined Nancy Kulp and Buddy Ebsen in 1981 as the only original cast members to appear in the reunion movie Return of the Beverly Hillbillies. Douglas was a guest star on a number of other television programs and the subject of paper dolls, dolls, coloring books, and various toys during the height of the show's popularity. In a 2003 interview with "Confessions of a Pop Culture Addict", she summed up her views on the role: "Elly May was like a slice out of my life. She is a wonderful little door opener for me because people love her, and they love the Hillbillies. Even to this day, it's shown every day somewhere. But, as with any abilities, she may open a door for you, but you have to have substance or integrity to advance you through that door."

In 1992, Douglas and Baer attended Ebsen's 84th-birthday celebration in Beverly Hills, California. In 1993, Douglas, Ebsen, and Baer reunited on The Jerry Springer Show, and for a final time in a CBS-TV television special, The Legend of The Beverly Hillbillies.

In December 2010, Mattel released a new collection of three Barbies called the Classic TV Collection. These dolls were Samantha Stephens (from Bewitched, played by Elizabeth Montgomery); Jeannie (from I Dream of Jeannie, played by Barbara Eden); and Elly May Clampett.

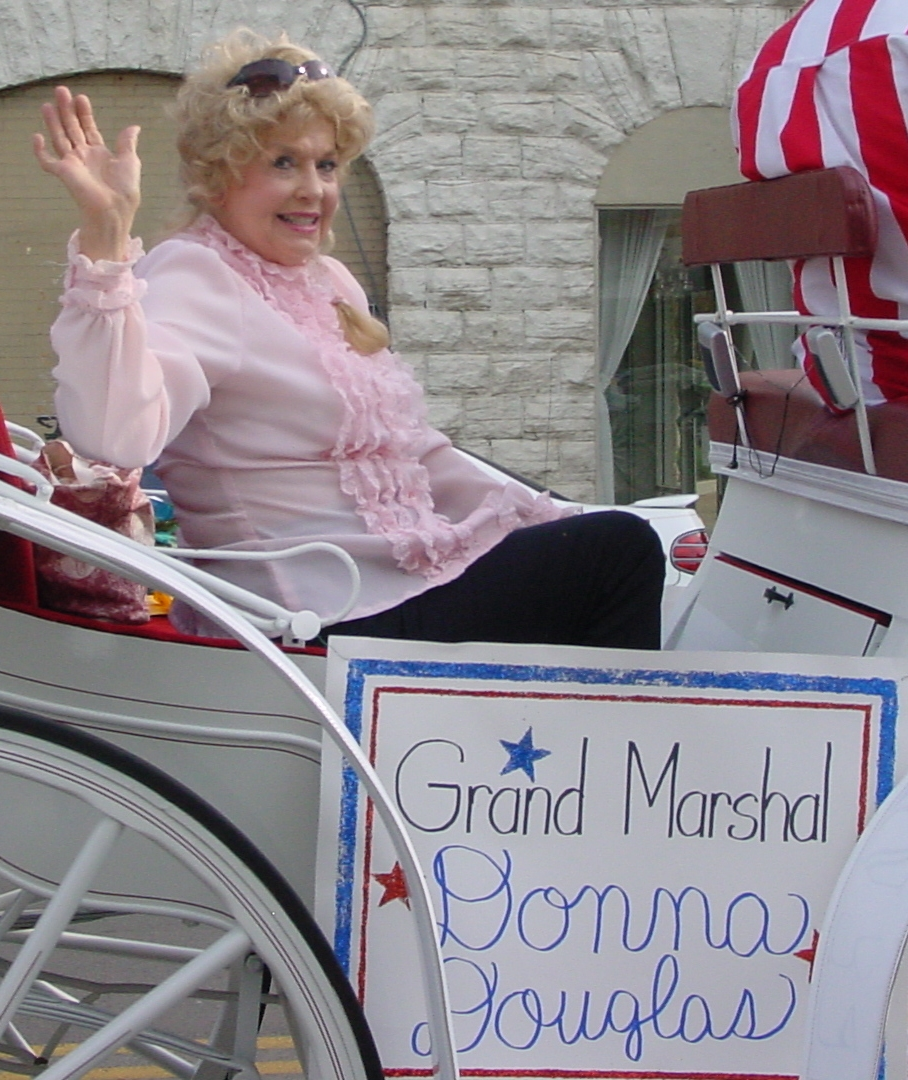
Douglas in 2007 as grand marshal at a parade in Lawrenceburg, Tennessee

=== After acting career ===
Douglas received her real-estate license after The Beverly Hillbillies finished production. She did not work in that field long, however, as she remained in show business and found other projects.

Douglas frequently performed as a gospel singer and was a speaker at church groups, youth groups, schools, and colleges across the United States. One focus of her charitable work was speaking in support of various Christian children's homes, mostly in the American South. She appeared at conventions and trade fairs. She recorded several gospel albums, the first released in 1982, and recorded a few minor country music records during the 1970s and 1980s.

Douglas wrote and published a religion-based children's book titled Donna's Critters and Kids: Children's Stories with a Bible Touch. The book included Bible stories featuring animals combined with a coloring book. In November 2011, she released a new children's book titled Miss Donna's Mulberry Acres Farm. In 2013, Douglas published a cookbook, Southern Favorites with a Taste of Hollywood, which collects recipes of Southern cooking from show-business friends and colleagues such as Ebsen, Phyllis Diller, Valerie Harper, and Debbie Reynolds. The book also has a section on good manners called "Hollywood Social Graces".

== Personal life ==
Douglas married her first husband, Roland Bourgeois Jr., in 1951. She had her only child, Danny Bourgeois, in 1954. The couple divorced that same year. She married Robert M. Leeds, director of The Beverly Hillbillies, in 1971; they divorced in 1980.

In 1982 in Broken Arrow, Oklahoma, Douglas enrolled at Rhema Bible Training Center, where she graduated in 1984 with an emphasis in children's ministry.

Douglas and Buddy Ebsen remained close friends for 32 years. In a 2011 interview with The Lincoln Times-News, she described Ebsen as "a wonderful man, very much like my own father, a quiet, reserved, and caring person".

In 2003, Douglas's mother and Ebsen died. Douglas and Max Baer, Jr had visited Ebsen in the hospital; following Ebsen's death, both delivered a eulogy at his funeral. A decade later, Douglas revealed the depth of her feelings for Ebsen in an interview with "Confessions of a Pop Culture Addict": "I loved Buddy Ebsen. He reminded me so much of my own dad. Most of my scenes were with Buddy, and most of Max's with Irene. Buddy was just a wonderful man. I related to him so easily. The night before he died, Max and I went up to the hospital to see him."

=== Lawsuits ===
==== Sister Act ====
On June 10, 1993, Douglas and her partner Curt Wilson in Associated Artists Entertainment, Inc., filed a $200 million lawsuit against The Walt Disney Company, Whoopi Goldberg, Bette Midler, their production companies, and Creative Artists Agency claiming that Sister Act was plagiarised from a book, A Nun in the Closet, owned by the partners. Douglas and Wilson claimed that in 1985, they had developed a screenplay from the book.

The lawsuit claimed that more than 100 similarities and plagiarisms existed between the movie and the book/screenplay owned by Douglas and Wilson. The lawsuit claimed that the developed screenplay had been submitted to Disney, Goldberg, and Midler three times during 1987 and 1988. In 1994, Douglas and Wilson declined a $1 million offer to settle the case. The judge found in favor of Walt Disney Pictures and the other defendants. Wilson stated at the time, "They would have had to copy our stuff verbatim for us to prevail."

==== Mattel ====
On May 4, 2011, Douglas filed a federal lawsuit claiming that Mattel and CBS Consumer Products used her name and likeness for a Barbie doll in the Classic TV Collection without her authorization. The suit alleged that packaging for the "Elly May" Barbie doll featured a photo of her portraying the character. She maintained that she had never endorsed the doll nor given Mattel permission to use her name to promote its sale, and she sought $75,000 in damages. She claimed that CBS and Mattel needed her approval to design the doll, while CBS and Mattel maintained that they did not need her consent or approval because the network held the exclusive rights to the character. It was settled on December 27, 2011, and details were confidential, but both sides claimed to be content with the outcome.

== Final years and death ==
In addition to her frequent traveling for celebrity appearances and speeches, Douglas enjoyed gardening, spending time with friends and family, and answering her fan mail.

Douglas died of pancreatic cancer at Baton Rouge General Hospital on January 1, 2015, aged 82. She is buried at East Feliciana Parish, Louisiana's Bluff Creek Cemetery.

Charlene Smith, Douglas's niece by marriage, said that Douglas returned to live in East Baton Rouge Parish around 2005: "She was always happy, always beautiful. You always saw her with all her makeup on. She never looked her age."

== Filmography ==
- Career (1959) as Marjorie Burke
- Li'l Abner (1959) as Chorus Dancer (uncredited)
- Bells Are Ringing (1960) as Party Guest (uncredited)
- Strangers When We Meet (1960) as Neighbor (uncredited)
- Lover Come Back (1961) as Deborah
- Frankie and Johnny (1966) as Frankie
- Chronicles of Life Trials (2013) as Marjorie (final film role)

== Television ==
- Bachelor Father (1959) as Alice in episode "Kelly's Idol"
- U.S. Marshal (1959) as Joyce Markham in episode "Trigger Happy"
- The Twilight Zone (November 11, 1960) as Janet Tyler in episode "Eye of the Beholder" and (May 25, 1962) as Woman No. 1 in episode "Cavender Is Coming"
- Lock-Up (1960) as Gloria Larkey in episode "The Case of Dan Gray"
- Whirlybirds (1960) as Girl in episode "Four Little Indians"
- The Detectives Starring Robert Taylor (1960) as Sandra Hoyle in episode "Alibis"
- Route 66 (November 2, 1960) as Model in episode "Layout at Glen Canyon"
- Thriller (January 3, 1961) in episode "The Hungry Glass"
- 77 Sunset Strip (April 28, 1961) as Rhonda Sheridan in episode "The Celluloid Cowboy"
- Hennesey (May 22, 1961) as Sheree in episode "His Honor, Dr. Blair"
- The Aquanauts (1961) as Nancy Gard in episode "The Stakeout Adventure"
- Michael Shayne (1961) as Dusa Quick in episode "Murder Is a Fine Art"
- Surfside 6 (two episodes, 1961)
- Dr. Kildare (1961) as Jenny in episode:"Second Chance"
- Pete and Gladys (two episodes, 1961)
- Mister Ed (three episodes, 1961–1962) as Jane Parker in episode "The Busy Wife"
- Sam Benedict (1961) as Francine in episode "Hanigan"
- The Beverly Hillbillies (1962–1971) (a main character) as Elly May Clampett
- The Defenders (1964) as Mary Andrews in episode "Drink Like a Lady"
- Night Gallery (January 26, 1972) as Mildred McVane in episode "Last Rites for a Dead Druid"
- Adam-12 (1972, season 5) as Nina Draper in episode "18 — The Beast"
- McMillan & Wife (January 6, 1974) as Barmaid in episode 5 "The Man Without a Face"
- Return of the Beverly Hillbillies (1981) as Elly May Clampett
- The Super Mario Bros. Super Show! (one episode, 1989) as Ellie Mae
- The Phil Donahue Show (1992) as herself in episode "Famous Past Celebrities"
- The Jerry Springer Show (1993) as herself in episode "Beverly Hillbillies on Jerry Springer"
- The Nanny (March 31, 1999) as herself in episode "California, Here We Come"

== Discography ==
- The Beverly Hillbillies (television soundtrack) (1963)
- Donna Douglas Sings Gospel (1982)
- Here Come the Critters (1983)
- Donna Douglas Sings Gospel II (1986)
- Back on the Mountain (1989)
