= Bank of Slaughter =

- U.S. National Register of Historic Places
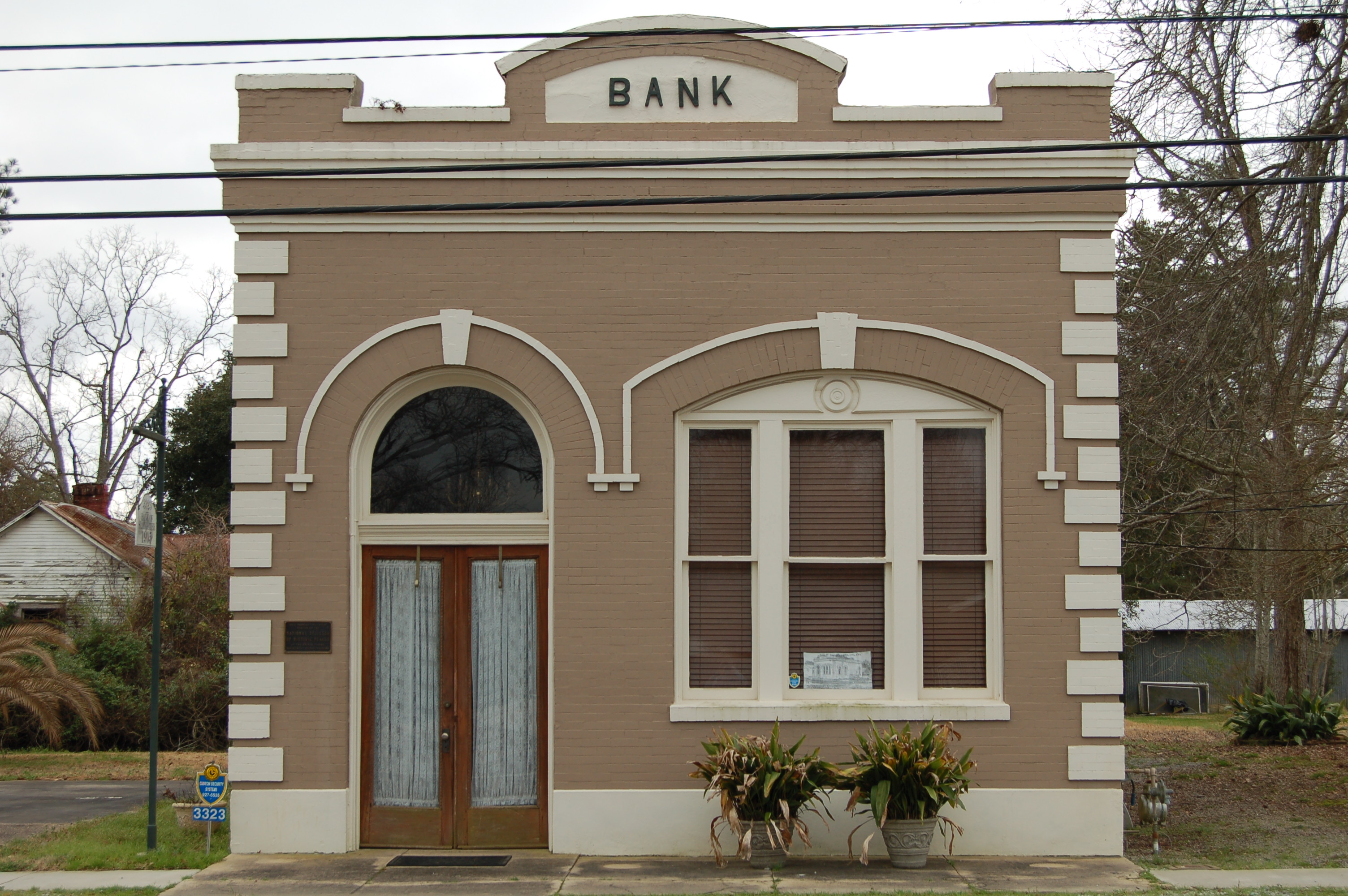

- Location within Louisiana Location within the United States
- Location: 3323 Church Street, Slaughter, Louisiana
- Coordinates: 30°43′04″N 91°08′40″W
- Area: less than one acre
- Built: 1905
- Architectural style: Italianate
- NRHP reference No.: 05000369
- Added to NRHP: May 6, 2005

The Bank of Slaughter is a restrained Italianate-style building built in 1905 and located at 3323 Church Street in Slaughter, Louisiana in East Feliciana Parish. It was listed on the National Register of Historic Places in 2005.

It is a small one-story brick building which is significant for its opening represented the arrival of banking services in the community of Slaughter. The bank was organized May 27, 1905 and opened for business September 12, 1905, with a capitalization of $15,000. The Bank of Slaughter remained the sole bank of the community until its closure during the Great Depression, on May 11, 1933.

== See also ==
- National Register of Historic Places listings in East Feliciana Parish, Louisiana
