= Oakland Plantation House (Gurley, Louisiana) =

Historic house in Louisiana, United States

- U.S. National Register of Historic Places
- Location within Louisiana Location within the United States
- Location: Along LA 963, about 0.63 miles (1.01 km) west of Gurley
- Nearest city: Gurley, Louisiana
- Coordinates: 30°52′18″N 91°08′41″W
- Built: 1827
- Architect: Thomas W. Scott
- NRHP reference No.: 80001720
- Added to NRHP: October 3, 1980

Oakland Plantation House is a historic mansion located Along LA 963, about 0.63 miles (1.01 km) west of Gurley, Louisiana.

The house was built by Judge Thomas W. Scott in 1827. It has a wide front gallery, and the entrance is highlighted by two large double doors. Inside there are plank ceilings, Federal period woodwork, beaded board walls, and molded Adam style mantels.

Judge Scott's son-in-law, Iveson Greene Gayden, named the house after his Mississippi alma mater, Oakland College.

The house fell into disrepair until it was bought in 1976 by an attorney, William Hutchinson McClendon III, and his wife, Eugenia Slaughter, who have fully restored Oakland Plantation.

The house was listed on the National Register of Historic Places on October 3, 1980.

== See also ==
- List of plantations in Louisiana
- National Register of Historic Places listings in East Feliciana Parish, Louisiana
