= Louisiana Highway 69 =

State highway in Louisiana, United States

Louisiana Highway 69

- Route of LA 69 highlighted in red

Route information
- Maintained by Louisiana DOTD
- Length: 15.356 mi (24.713 km)
- Existed: 1955 renumbering–present
- Tourist routes: National Scenic Byway: Great River Road

Major junctions
- South end: LA 70 in Grand Bayou
- LA 1 in White Castle
- North end: LA 1 west of Bayou Goula

Location
- Country: United States
- State: Louisiana
- Parishes: Assumption, Iberville

Highway system
- Louisiana State Highway System; Interstate; US; State; Scenic
← I-69	→ LA 70

Louisiana Highway 69 (LA 69) is a state highway located in southeastern Louisiana. It runs 15.36 miles (24.72 km) in a general north–south direction from LA 70 in Grand Bayou to LA 1 northwest of White Castle.

The route traverses the small town of White Castle, located on the west bank of the Mississippi River in Iberville Parish. It connects the town and surrounding farmland with the narrow ribbon of communities within the vast Atchafalaya Swamp situated along LA 70 and LA 75 on the Belle and Lower Grand rivers. LA 69 was designated in the 1955 Louisiana Highway renumbering from portions of several former state routes.

== Route description ==
From the south, LA 69 begins at a junction with LA 70 in an area of northern Assumption Parish known as Grand Bayou. The route heads north alongside the waterway of the same name through thickly wooded swampland. After 2.8 miles (4.5 km), LA 69 crosses into Iberville Parish and intersects LA 996, which leads to the community of Bruly St. Martin. The highway continues through the swamp for another 2.8 miles (4.5 km), at which point the surroundings begin to transition to dry farmland. 3.0 miles (4.8 km) later, LA 69 passes through the rural community of Samstown and intersects LA 404.

Shortly afterward, LA 69 enters the town of White Castle as more residences begin to line the highway. Traveling along Bowie Street, LA 69 crosses the Union Pacific Railroad (UP) tracks at grade and passes through the town's historic downtown area. LA 69 then has a junction with LA 1, a divided four-lane highway that connects with Donaldsonville to the southeast and Plaquemine to the northwest. LA 69 crosses LA 1 and turns west onto 4th Street, running concurrent with LA 405.

The two routes exit White Castle three blocks later and travel alongside the west bank levee of the Mississippi River for 2.9 miles (4.7 km) to the small community of Bayou Goula. Here, LA 405 continues straight ahead along the River Road while LA 69 turns west onto Augusta Road, an old gravel plantation road. The route ends about one mile (1.6 km) later at a second junction with LA 1.

=== Route classification and data ===
The majority of the route, running from Grand Bayou to White Castle, is classified by the Louisiana Department of Transportation and Development (La DOTD) as a rural major collector. The concurrency with LA 405 is classified as a rural minor collector, and the gravel section west of Bayou Goula is a rural local road. Average daily traffic volume in 2013 was reported as 2,400 vehicles from the southern terminus to LA 404, increasing to a peak of 6,000 through White Castle, while the remainder of the route carries less than 600 vehicles. The posted speed limit is generally 55 mph (90 km/h), decreased to 30 mph (50 km/h) and 25 mph (40 km/h) through White Castle. LA 69 is an undivided two-lane highway for its entire length.

The portion of LA 69 running concurrent with LA 405 along the west bank levee of the Mississippi River is a small part of a National Scenic Byway known as the Great River Road.

== History ==
=== Pre-1955 route numbering ===
In the original Louisiana Highway system in use between 1921 and 1955, the modern LA 69 was part of four separate state routes, as follows: State Route 999 from the Assumption–Iberville parish line to Samstown; State Route 253 from Samstown through White Castle; State Route 30 along the Mississippi River to Bayou Goula; and State Route 261 west from Bayou Goula. The portion of LA 69 traversing the swampland south of Samstown did not exist during much of the pre-1955 era, although it had been planned as part of Route 999 since 1930 and was included in the original legislative description of that route. The highway was completed as far south as the parish line sometime after 1937, allowing a connection with Grand Bayou via what is now LA 996 (former State Route 566). The portions of the pre-1955 routes now followed by LA 69 remained largely the same otherwise prior to the 1955 Louisiana Highway renumbering. The route was entirely gravel surfaced during this time except for a brief section of pavement through downtown White Castle.

=== Post-1955 route history ===
LA 69 was created in the 1955 renumbering, creating a continuous route between the Grand Bayou area and the town of White Castle. The highway continued to follow the existing route through Bruly St. Martin until the modern alignment was completed in the early 1960s.

Class "B": La 69—From a junction with La 70 near Grand Bayou through or near Bruly, St. Martin, White Castle and Bayou Goula to a junction with La 1.
Class "C": La 69—From a junction with La 1 at or near Bayou Goula southwest approximately 3.4 miles through or near Blythwood and Augusta.

— 1955 legislative route description

With the 1955 renumbering, the state highway department initially categorized all routes into three classes: "A" (primary), "B" (secondary), and "C" (farm-to-market). This system has since been updated and replaced by a more specific functional classification system. When finally completed, the new roadway in Assumption Parish was originally designated as part of LA 996 but was switched with the LA 69 designation around 1965. This change applied the route number within the "primary" system of state highways onto the best and most direct route, a practice not often followed during the pre-1955 system.

As the 1955 route description indicates, LA 69 originally continued along Augusta Road across LA 1 west of Bayou Goula, but this portion of the route was returned to local control shortly afterward. About this same time, the section of LA 69 south of White Castle through Samstown was paved. The roadway traversing the swamp between Grand Bayou and Samstown was paved around 1965, but the portion along Augusta Road in Bayou Goula remains gravel to this day.

== Transfer to local control ==
As of 2013 La DOTD had a program to transfer about 5,000 miles (8,000 km) of state-owned roadways to local governments in the following years. As of 2019 the portion of LA 69 running along Augusta Road in Bayou Goula was planned to be transferred from the state highway system to local control.

== Major intersections ==
Parish	Location	mi	km	Destinations	Notes
Assumption	Grand Bayou	0.000	0.000	LA 70 – Pierre Part, Donaldsonville	Southern terminus
Iberville		2.815	4.530	LA 996 – Bruly St. Martin	Northern terminus of LA 996
Iberville		7.802	12.556	LA 995 (Myles Road)	Western terminus of LA 995
Iberville	Samstown	8.683	13.974	LA 404	Eastern terminus of LA 404
Iberville	White Castle	11.258– 11.268	18.118– 18.134	LA 1 – Plaquemine, Donaldsonville	
Iberville	White Castle	11.374	18.305	LA 405 south (Bowie Street)	South end of LA 405 concurrency
Iberville		11.857	19.082	LA 993 (Richland Road)	Northern terminus of LA 993
Iberville	Bayou Goula	14.454	23.261	LA 405 north (River Road)	North end of LA 405 concurrency
Iberville		15.356	24.713	LA 1 – Plaquemine, Donaldsonville	Northern terminus
1.000 mi = 1.609 km; 1.000 km = 0.621 mi: Concurrency terminus
