= Return of the Beverly Hillbillies =

- Genre: Comedy
- Written by: Paul Henning
- Directed by: Robert Leeds
- Starring: Buddy Ebsen; Donna Douglas; Nancy Kulp; Ray Young; Imogene Coca; Werner Klemperer
- Music by: Billy May; Earl Scruggs
- Country of origin: United States
- Original language: English

Production
- Executive producers: Al Simon; Ron Beckman
- Producer: Paul Henning
- Cinematography: Frank Phillips
- Editor: Richard Greer
- Running time: 100 minutes
- Production company: CBS Entertainment Productions

Original release
- Network: CBS
- Release: October 6, 1981

Related
- The Beverly Hillbillies

Return of the Beverly Hillbillies is a 1981 American made-for-television comedy film based on the 1962–1971 sitcom The Beverly Hillbillies which reunited original cast members Buddy Ebsen, Donna Douglas and Nancy Kulp reprising their characters of Jed Clampett, Elly May Clampett and Jane Hathaway, along with newcomers Werner Klemperer as C.D. Medford, Ray Young as Jethro Bodine and Imogene Coca as Granny's 100-year-old mother. Few original cast members were absent: Irene Ryan (Granny) died in 1973, Raymond Bailey (Milburn Drysdale) died in 1980 and Max Baer Jr. (the original Jethro) chose not to take part.

The film was produced and written by original series creator Paul Henning and was intended as a pilot for a proposed revival of the series, but this never materialized. Return of the Beverly Hillbillies premiered as The CBS Tuesday Night Movie on October 6, 1981.

== Synopsis ==
Following the death of Granny, Jed Clampett returned to his roots to live in a backwoods cabin in the town of Bug Tussle rather than living alone at his Beverly Hills mansion after having voluntarily divided his massive fortune between daughter Elly May and nephew Jethro Bodine, both of whom have remained on the West Coast (Jethro is now a successful Hollywood producer running his own film studio and Elly May has opened a zoo for her beloved critters). Jane Hathaway is now a Washington bureaucrat working for the United States Department of Energy. Her former boss, Milburn Drysdale, has died.

It is 1981 and the Reagan administration is desperate to solve the energy crisis: they dispatch Jane and her obnoxious and stuffy boss C.D. Medford to search for the secret formula of Granny's powerful home-brewed "white lightning" which they are convinced could be the miracle cure for America's gas crisis. Since Granny died some time ago, Jane and C.D. arrive at Jed's old cabin, hoping to score just a few drops of Granny's medicine. Unfortunately, what little survives is ruined by C.D., and so Jed suggests that they contact either one of the "youngins" in California to see if they have any of Granny's medicine left because someone who sure isn't going to tell them is Granny's 100-year-old "Maw", who now runs an "old ladies" home in Bug Tussle and still holds the moonshine recipe.

== Cast ==
- Buddy Ebsen as Jed Clampett
- Donna Douglas as Elly May Clampett
- Nancy Kulp as Jane Hathaway
- Ray Young as Jethro Bodine
- Imogene Coca as Granny's Maw
- Werner Klemperer as C.D. Medford
- Linda Kaye Henning as Linda (Secretary)
- King Donovan as Andy Miller (Father)
- Lurene Tuttle as Mollie Heller
- Charles Lane as Chief
- George "Shug" Fisher as Judge Gillum
- Howard Culver as Veterinarian
- Dana Kimmell as 2nd Old Maid
- Fenton Jones as Square Dance Caller
- Heather Locklear as Heather

== DVD release ==
On March 12, 2013, Return of the Beverly Hillbillies was released on DVD for the first time by MPI Home Video.
