= Ethel, Louisiana =

- Unincorporated community
- Location within Louisiana Location within the United States
- Coordinates: 30°47′29″N 91°07′50″W
- Country: United States
- State: Louisiana
- Parish: East Feliciana
- Elevation: 164 ft (50 m)
- Time zone: UTC-6 (Central (CST))
  - Summer (DST): UTC-5 (CDT)
- ZIP code: 70730
- Area code: 225
- GNIS feature ID: 534840

Ethel is an unincorporated community in East Feliciana Parish, Louisiana, United States. The community is located along Louisiana Highway 19, 5.1 miles (8.2 km) north of Slaughter. Ethel has a post office with ZIP code 70730, which opened on September 15, 1884.

== Notable person ==
Jimmy Dotson, a blues singer, guitarist and drummer, was born in Ethel.
