= East Feliciana Parish, Louisiana =

Parish in Louisiana, United States

East Feliciana Parish
- Parish
- Parish of East Feliciana; Paroisse de Feliciana Est (French); Parroquia de Feliciana Oriental (Spanish)
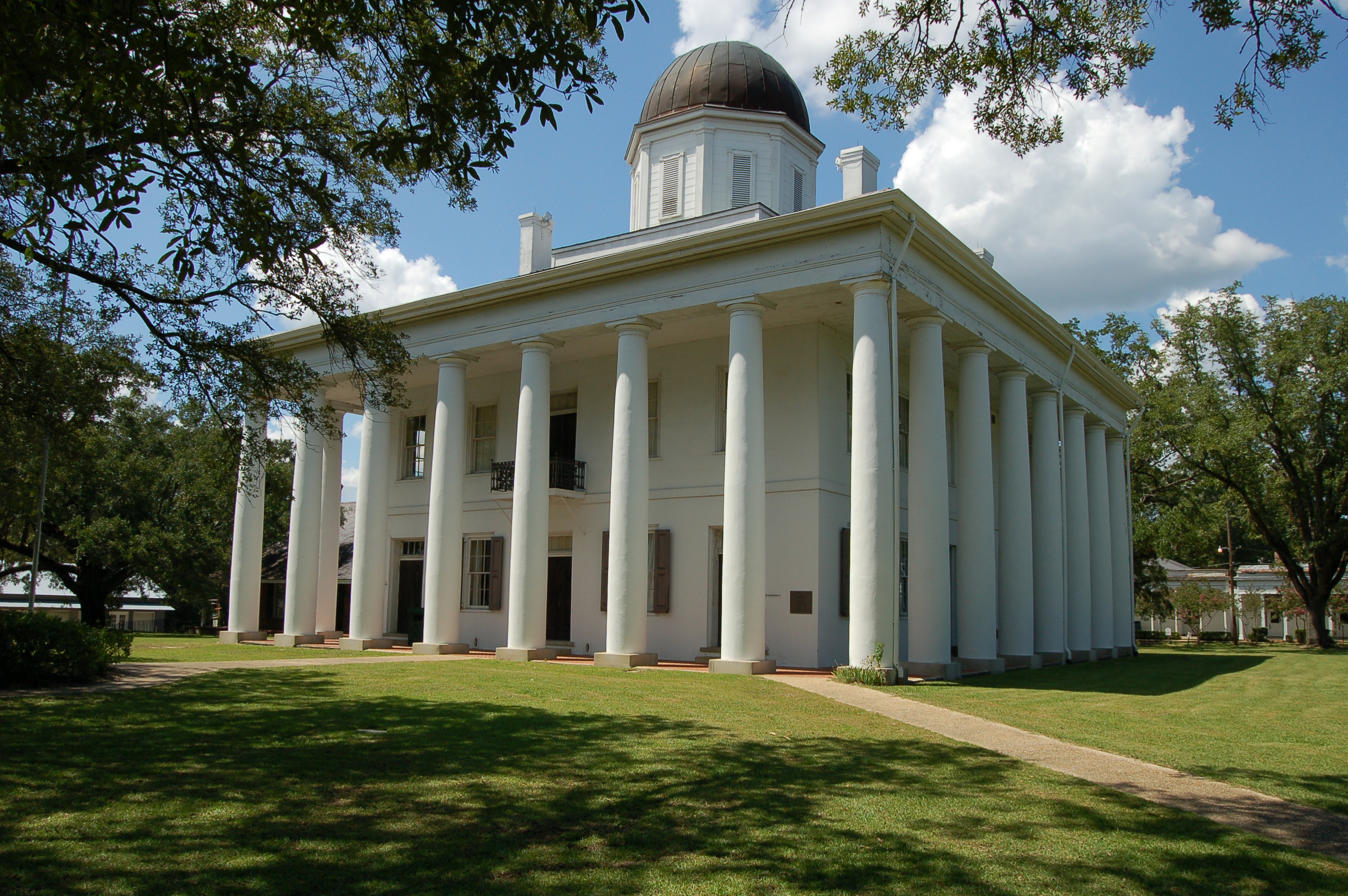
- East Feliciana Parish Courthouse

- Seal

- Location within the U.S. state of Louisiana
- Coordinates: 30°51′N 91°03′W
- Country: United States
- State: Louisiana
- Founded: 1824
- Named for: Marie Felice de Gálvez
- Seat: Clinton
- Largest town: Jackson

Area
  - Total: 456 sq mi (1,180 km^{2})
  - Land: 453 sq mi (1,170 km^{2})
  - Water: 2.4 sq mi (6.2 km^{2}) 0.5%

Population (2020)
  - Total: 19,539
  - Estimate (2025): 18,911 ▼
  - Density: 43.1/sq mi (16.7/km^{2})
- Time zone: UTC−6 (Central)
  - Summer (DST): UTC−5 (CDT)
- Congressional districts: 5th, 6th
- Website: www.eastfelicianaclerk.org

East Feliciana Parish (French: Paroisse de Feliciana Est, Spanish: Parroquia de Feliciana Oriental) is a parish located in the U.S. state of Louisiana. At the 2020 census, the population was 19,531. The parish seat is Clinton.

Established when Feliciana Parish was divided in 1824, both East and West Feliciana parishes are part of the Baton Rouge metropolitan statistical area. They are also considered part of the Florida Parishes, at one time part of Spain's West Florida colony.

== History ==
The parish was part of Feliciana Parish, which was founded and named in 1810 by Spaniards who then controlled the territory. The Spanish governor, Bernardo de Gálvez, named it in honor of his wife, Marie Felicité.

After the United States annexed this territory, population continued to increase. It had been developed for sugar cane plantations and business was thriving. In 1824, the state legislature divided the parish into East Feliciana Parish and West Feliciana Parish, so that residents would have easier access to their parish seats.

The Louisiana State Insane Asylum was the first state institution in the parish, established near the town of Jackson in 1847. It was greatly enlarged and improved under the administration of Dr. John Welch Jones, who was appointed as superintendent in 1874, during the Reconstruction era. The bi-racial legislators in power at the time made commitments to public education and state welfare institutions. The facility was later called East Louisiana State Hospital.

== Geography ==
According to the U.S. Census Bureau, the parish has a total area of 456 square miles (1,180 km^{2}), of which 453 square miles (1,170 km^{2}) is land and 2.4 square miles (6.2 km^{2}) (0.5%) is water.

=== Major highways ===
- U.S. Highway 61
- Louisiana Highway 10
- Louisiana Highway 19
- Louisiana Highway 63
- Louisiana Highway 67
- Louisiana Highway 68
- Louisiana Highway 409
- Louisiana Highway 412
- Louisiana Highway 422
- Louisiana Highway 432
- Louisiana Highway 952
- Louisiana Highway 953
- Louisiana Highway 954
- Louisiana Highway 955
- Louisiana Highway 956
- Louisiana Highway 957
- Louisiana Highway 958
- Louisiana Highway 959
- Louisiana Highway 960
- Louisiana Highway 961
- Louisiana Highway 963
- Louisiana Highway 964
- Louisiana Highway 3255

=== Adjacent parishes and counties ===
- Wilkinson County, Mississippi (northwest)
- Amite County, Mississippi (northeast)
- St. Helena Parish (east)
- East Baton Rouge Parish (south)
- West Feliciana Parish (west)

== Communities ==
=== Towns ===
- Clinton (parish seat)
- Jackson (largest municipality)
- Slaughter

=== Villages ===
- Norwood
- Wilson

=== Unincorporated communities ===
- Bluff Creek
- Ethel
- Felps
- Gurley
- Woodland

== Demographics ==
Historical population
Census	Pop.	Note	%±
1830	8,247		—
1840	11,893		44.2%
1850	13,598		14.3%
1860	14,697		8.1%
1870	13,499		−8.2%
1880	15,132		12.1%
1890	17,903		18.3%
1900	20,443		14.2%
1910	20,055		−1.9%
1920	17,487		−12.8%
1930	17,449		−0.2%
1940	18,039		3.4%
1950	19,133		6.1%
1960	20,198		5.6%
1970	17,657		−12.6%
1980	19,015		7.7%
1990	19,211		1.0%
2000	21,360		11.2%
2010	20,267		−5.1%
2020	19,539		−3.6%
2025 (est.)	18,911	▼	−3.2%
U.S. Decennial Census; 1790-1960 1900-1990; 1990-2000 2010

East Feliciana Parish, Louisiana – Racial and ethnic composition Note: the US Census treats Hispanic/Latino as an ethnic category. This table excludes Latinos from the racial categories and assigns them to a separate category. Hispanics/Latinos may be of any race.
Race / Ethnicity (NH = Non-Hispanic)	Pop 1980	Pop 1990	Pop 2000	Pop 2010	Pop 2020	% 1980	% 1990	% 2000	% 2010	% 2020
White alone (NH)	9,582	9,957	10,989	10,666	11,411	50.39%	51.83%	51.45%	52.63%	58.40%
Black or African American alone (NH)	9,096	9,025	10,012	9,052	7,108	47.84%	46.98%	46.87%	44.66%	36.38%
Native American or Alaska Native alone (NH)	20	21	33	60	60	0.11%	0.11%	0.15%	0.30%	0.31%
Asian alone (NH)	52	22	48	51	46	0.27%	0.11%	0.22%	0.25%	0.24%
Native Hawaiian or Pacific Islander alone (NH)	x	x	1	1	9	x	x	0.00%	0.00%	0.05%
Other race alone (NH)	0	0	17	14	42	0.00%	0.00%	0.08%	0.07%	0.21%
Mixed race or Multiracial (NH)	x	x	103	215	472	x	x	0.48%	1.06%	2.42%
Hispanic or Latino (any race)	265	186	157	208	391	1.39%	0.97%	0.74%	1.03%	2.00%
Total	19,015	19,211	21,360	20,267	19,539	100.00%	100.00%	100.00%	100.00%	100.00%

At the 2019 American Community Survey, there were 19,371 people living in the parish, down from 20,267 at the 2010 United States census. The 2019 census-estimated population comprised 6,959 households living in 8,487 housing units spread throughout the parish. There were 1,595 businesses operating in East Feliciana. By the 2020 United States census, there were 19,539 people, 6,959 households, and 4,777 families residing in the parish.

In 2010, the racial and ethnic makeup of the parish was the following: 53.2% were White, 44.9% Black and African American, 0.3% American Indian and Alaska Native, 0.3% Asian, 0.2% of some other race and 1.1% of two or more races; 1.0% were Hispanic or Latin American of any race. At the 2019 census-estimates, 54.5% were non-Hispanic white, 43.6% Black and African American, 0.5% American Indian and Alaska Native, 0.3% Asian, 0.2% some other race, and 0.9% multiracial. Hispanics and Latin Americans of any race made up 1.7% of the total population. During the 2020 census, the parish's race and ethnic composition was 58.3% non-Hispanic white, 36.38% Black and African American, 0.31% Native American, 0.24% Asian, 0.05% Pacific Islander, 2.63% other or multiracial, and 2.0% Hispanic or Latino of any race.

As of 2019-2021's census estimates, approximately 40% of the population was employed in the parish, and the home-ownership rate was 80.5%. The median value of owner-occupied housing units was $139,300, and median gross rent was $647. Residents had a median household income of $51,803; males earned a median income of $61,105 versus $32,243 for females. At the 2000 United States census, the median household income was $31,631, and the median family income was $37,278. Males had a median income of $31,804 versus $20,243 for females. The per capita income for the parish was $15,428. An estimated 23.3% of the parish lived at or below the poverty line in 2019, up from 23% at the 2000 U.S. census.

According to the Association of Religion Data Archives in 2020, the Southern Baptist Convention was the parish's largest Christian denomination, Christianity being the largest religion as part of the Bible Belt. Southern Baptists were spread out in 16 congregations and numbered 5,248; following, United Methodists numbered 1,636. Roman Catholicism had 250 adherents.

== Education ==
East Feliciana Parish School Board operates public schools in the parish. Elementary schools include Jackson Elementary School, Slaughter Elementary School, and Clinton Elementary School. Upper public schools include East Feliciana Middle and High school. Some students in the parish attend Wilkinson County Christian Academy in Wilkinson County, Mississippi.

The parish is in the service area of Baton Rouge Community College.

Silliman Institute in Clinton was established in the late 1960s.

== Government and infrastructure ==
The East Feliciana Parish Police Jury is the governing body of the parish and consists of nine representatives elected by district.

East Louisiana State Hospital, currently referred to as Eastern Louisiana Mental Health System is located in Jackson. Its main building is considered to be one of the largest and most significant Greek Revival buildings in Louisiana, it has been placed on the National Register of Historic Places. The institution was one of the first mental hospitals in the South.

The Louisiana Department of Public Safety and Corrections operates the Dixon Correctional Institute in Jackson.

United States presidential election results for East Felicina Parish, Louisiana
Year	Republican		Democratic		Third party(ies)	
Year	No.	%	No.	%	No.	%
1912	1	0.23%	422	95.91%	17	3.86%
1916	21	4.11%	489	95.69%	1	0.20%
1920	30	5.37%	529	94.63%	0	0.00%
1924	25	4.73%	504	95.27%	0	0.00%
1928	160	20.46%	622	79.54%	0	0.00%
1932	65	5.23%	1,178	94.77%	0	0.00%
1936	102	8.80%	1,057	91.20%	0	0.00%
1940	164	13.41%	1,059	86.59%	0	0.00%
1944	220	20.20%	869	79.80%	0	0.00%
1948	127	10.29%	267	21.64%	840	68.07%
1952	876	46.23%	1,019	53.77%	0	0.00%
1956	912	37.45%	1,304	53.55%	219	8.99%
1960	313	16.76%	415	22.23%	1,139	61.01%
1964	1,900	79.63%	486	20.37%	0	0.00%
1968	457	11.17%	1,409	34.44%	2,225	54.39%
1972	1,992	48.98%	1,603	39.41%	472	11.61%
1976	1,668	31.34%	3,485	65.47%	170	3.19%
1980	2,650	38.56%	4,033	58.68%	190	2.76%
1984	4,166	49.59%	4,122	49.07%	113	1.35%
1988	3,527	47.99%	3,659	49.79%	163	2.22%
1992	2,813	35.63%	4,093	51.84%	989	12.53%
1996	2,949	35.10%	4,714	56.11%	738	8.78%
2000	4,051	50.02%	3,870	47.78%	178	2.20%
2004	5,021	54.57%	4,091	44.46%	89	0.97%
2008	5,432	54.61%	4,383	44.06%	132	1.33%
2012	5,397	52.87%	4,648	45.53%	164	1.61%
2016	5,569	55.46%	4,235	42.17%	238	2.37%
2020	6,064	57.70%	4,280	40.73%	165	1.57%
2024	6,020	60.52%	3,809	38.29%	118	1.19%

== Notable people ==
- Donna Douglas (1932-2015), actress who starred on The Beverly Hillbillies. She is buried in Bluff Creek's Baptist Church cemetery.
- Erick Erickson, Editor of RedState
- John Welch Jones (1826-1916), medical doctor, Confederate cavalry officer and one-time superintendent of the Louisiana State Insane Asylum
- Junius Wallace Jones (1890-1977), Major-General, United States Air Force
- Lawrence Brooks (1909-2022), the oldest American veteran of World War II, was born in Norwood.
- Eddie Robinson, football coach at Grambling State University, was born in Jackson, Louisiana.
- John D. Travis (1940-2016), state representative for District 62, including his native East Feliciana Parish, 1984 to 2000
- Kendell Beckwith, NFL player, currently plays for the Tampa Bay Buccaneers. Attended East Feliciana High School and went on to play for the LSU Tigers before being drafted by Tampa Bay.

== See also ==
- National Register of Historic Places listings in East Feliciana Parish, Louisiana
- Louisville, New Orleans and Texas Railway – Clinton and Port Hudson Railroad
