= Glynn, Louisiana =

Unincorporated community in Louisiana

- Unincorporated community
- Location of Glynn in Louisiana
- Coordinates: 30°37′36″N 91°21′19″W
- Country: United States
- State: Louisiana
- Elevation: 36 ft (11 m)
- Time zone: UTC-6 (CST)
  - Summer (DST): UTC-5 (CDT)
- ZIP code: 70736
- Area code: 225
- GNIS feature ID: 543240

Glynn is an unincorporated community in southeastern Pointe Coupee Parish, Louisiana, United States. The community is located along Louisiana Highway 416, west of the Mississippi River.

== History ==
In 1847, an Irishman named Martin Glynn immigrated to New Orleans, Louisiana and set himself up as a wholesale merchant, grocer, and cotton factor. As his fortune grew, Glynn purchased property in West Baton Rouge and Pointe Coupee parishes. After the Civil War, Glynn moved his growing family to the 3,000 acres (12 km^{2}) he had acquired.

Around the turn of the century, the Texas and Pacific Railroad began laying track through his property, and on December 23, 1899, a post office was established. Martin's son, Charles Wilson Glynn, became its first postmaster. The post office, located near the intersection of Louisiana Highway 416 and Louisiana Highway 982, was in operation until 2024.

== Notable person ==
- Chris Williams — offensive tackle for the Buffalo Bills
