= Chris Williams (offensive lineman) =

American football player (born 1985)

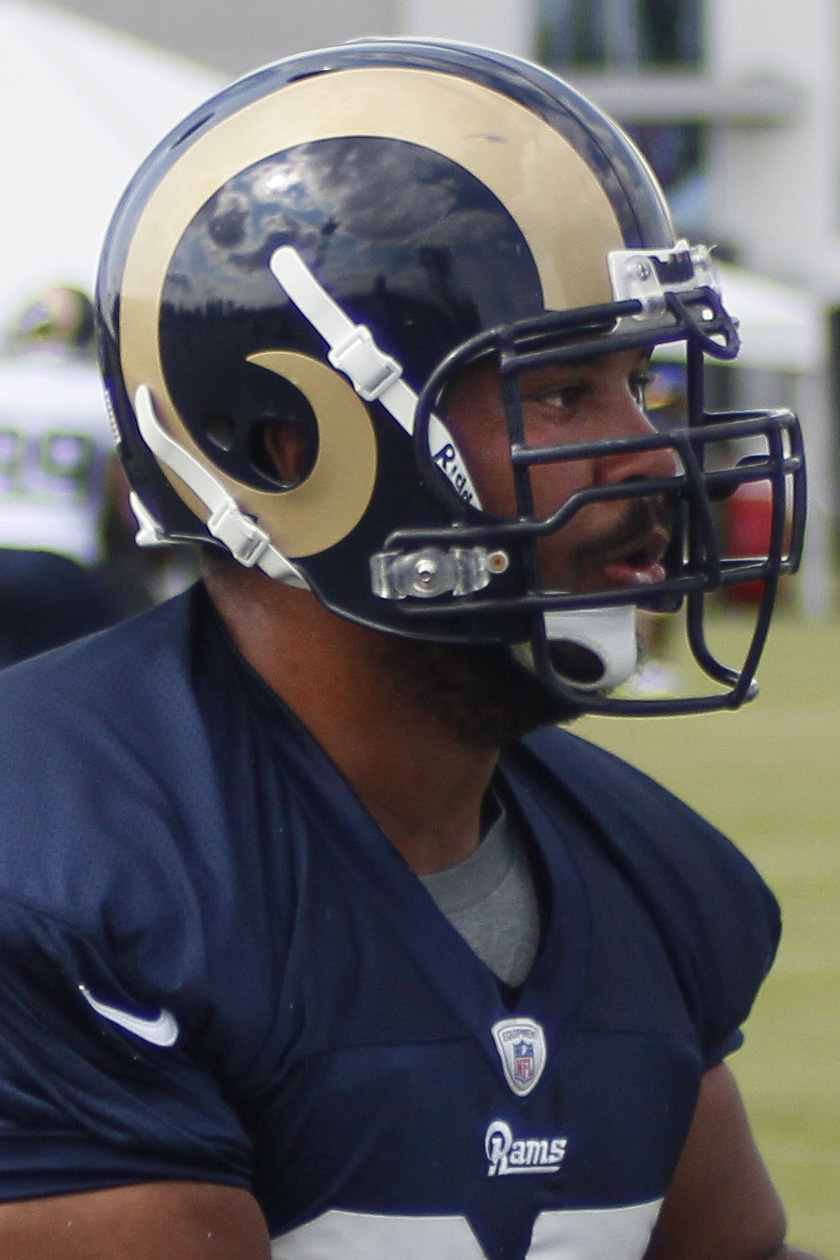
- Williams with the St. Louis Rams in 2013

No. 74, 65
- Position: Guard

Personal information
- Born: August 26, 1985 (age 41); Glynn, Louisiana, U.S.
- Listed height: 6 ft 6 in (1.98 m)
- Listed weight: 320 lb (145 kg)

Career information
- High school: Catholic (Baton Rouge, Louisiana)
- College: Vanderbilt (2004–2007)
- NFL draft: 2008: 1st round, 14th overall pick

Career history
- Chicago Bears (2008–2012); St. Louis Rams (2012–2013); Buffalo Bills (2014)

Awards and highlights
- First-team All-SEC (2007); Second-team All-SEC (2006)

Career NFL statistics
- Games played: 72
- Games started: 57
- Stats at Pro Football Reference

Christopher Joseph Williams (born August 26, 1985) is an American former professional football player who was a guard in the National Football League (NFL). He played college football for the Vanderbilt Commodores and was selected by the Chicago Bears 14th overall in the 2008 NFL draft. Williams also played for the St. Louis Rams and the Buffalo Bills.

== College career ==
After graduating from Catholic High School (Baton Rouge, Louisiana), Williams attended Vanderbilt where he played in 36 games and started 33 games. In 2007, he was First-team All-Southeastern Conference after allowing just one sack in 12 games. As a junior, Williams was a Second-team All-SEC selection after starting all 12 games at left tackle and allowing a single quarterback sack. The prior season Williams played all twelve games, starting nine at left guard but also playing left tackle. Williams was redshirted as a true freshman and did not see action the following season either.

== Professional career ==
Pre-draft measurables
Height	Weight	Arm length	Hand span	40-yard dash	10-yard split	20-yard split	20-yard shuttle	Three-cone drill	Vertical jump	Broad jump	Bench press
6 ft 6 in (1.98 m)	315 lb (143 kg)	33 1/2 in (0.85 m)	10 in (0.25 m)	5.17 s	1.78 s	2.98 s	4.85 s	7.95 s	25.0 in (0.64 m)	8 ft 7 in (2.62 m)	21 reps
All values from NFL Combine

=== Chicago Bears ===
Williams was drafted by the Bears in the first round with the 14th overall pick in the 2008 NFL draft. On July 23, 2008, it was announced that he had signed a five-year contract with the Bears. Williams missed the camp's first weekend after sustaining a minor back injury. He was later diagnosed with separate injury, a herniated disc, which required minor surgery to repair.

Williams started taking part in conditioning and work-out drills in September. On November 2, 2008, he made his professional debut on the special teams in a win against the Detroit Lions. Williams was a starter in 2009, and played at right tackle to accommodate Orlando Pace, whom the team acquired via free agency on April 2, 2009. Smith eventually moved Williams back to left tackle after Pace was faced with inconsistent play and injuries. His first major test was to protect Jay Cutler's blindside against the highly touted Baltimore Ravens defense. The following week, he was paired against Jared Allen of the Minnesota Vikings, one of the league's top defensive lineman and pass rushers. Williams' prevented Allen from sacking Cutler, as the Bears beat the Vikings, 36–30.

Williams started the 2010 season as the Bears starting left tackle. However, he was injured early during the team's second game against the Dallas Cowboys. Williams spent the next several weeks nursing a hamstring injury and missed three games. Upon recovering from his injury, Mike Tice, the team's offensive line coach, decided to move Williams to the left guard position.

Williams was released by the Bears on October 16, 2012.

=== St. Louis Rams ===
Williams signed with the St. Louis Rams on October 22, 2012. He re-signed with the team on April 1, 2013, for $2.75 million on a one-year contract.

=== Buffalo Bills ===
On March 12, 2014, Williams signed a four-year, $13.5 million contract with the Buffalo Bills. The deal includes $5.5 million in guaranteed money.

His contract was terminated after a failed physical on July 28, 2015.

== Personal life ==
Williams was invited to participate in a shoot-the-puck contest during the Chicago Blackhawks and Calgary Flames playoff on April 18, 2009. During the contest, he successfully shot two pucks into two small openings in a goal from center ice. Williams claims that he had never shot a puck prior to the contest. Williams is an assistant football coach and teacher at Davidson Academy in Nashville tn Williams is married and has two children, a daughter and a son.
