= Torbert, Louisiana =

Unincorporated community in Louisiana

- Unincorporated community
- Location within Louisiana Location within the United States
- Coordinates: 30°33′16″N 91°29′25″W
- Country: United States
- State: Louisiana
- Parish: Pointe Coupee
- Elevation: 20 ft (6.1 m)
- Time zone: UTC-6 (Central (CST))
  - Summer (DST): UTC-5 (CDT)
- ZIP code: 70762
- Area code: 225
- GNIS feature ID: 539968
- FIPS code: 22-76020

Torbert, Louisiana is a community located in Pointe Coupee Parish, Louisiana, United States. It was first settled chiefly by Italian immigrants in the early 1900s.

Torbert was originally affiliated with the zip code 70781. However, on September 28, 2002, a decision was made to consolidate post offices in the parish. This consolidated Torbert with the postal zip code of 70762 (Oscar).

Major intersections in the community of Torbert include Louisiana Highway 978 with U.S. Highway 190, and also with Louisiana Highway 979.

Bayou Grosse Tete is a major waterway in Torbert.

Torbert was a major filming area of the miniseries "Bonnie and Clyde (2013 miniseries)", using the site of (now closed) Wilson's Lounge located at Manda Road. Other areas of Torbert are also included in the show.
