= Lawrence Brooks (American veteran) =

American World War II veteran (1909–2022)

Lawrence Nathanial Brooks
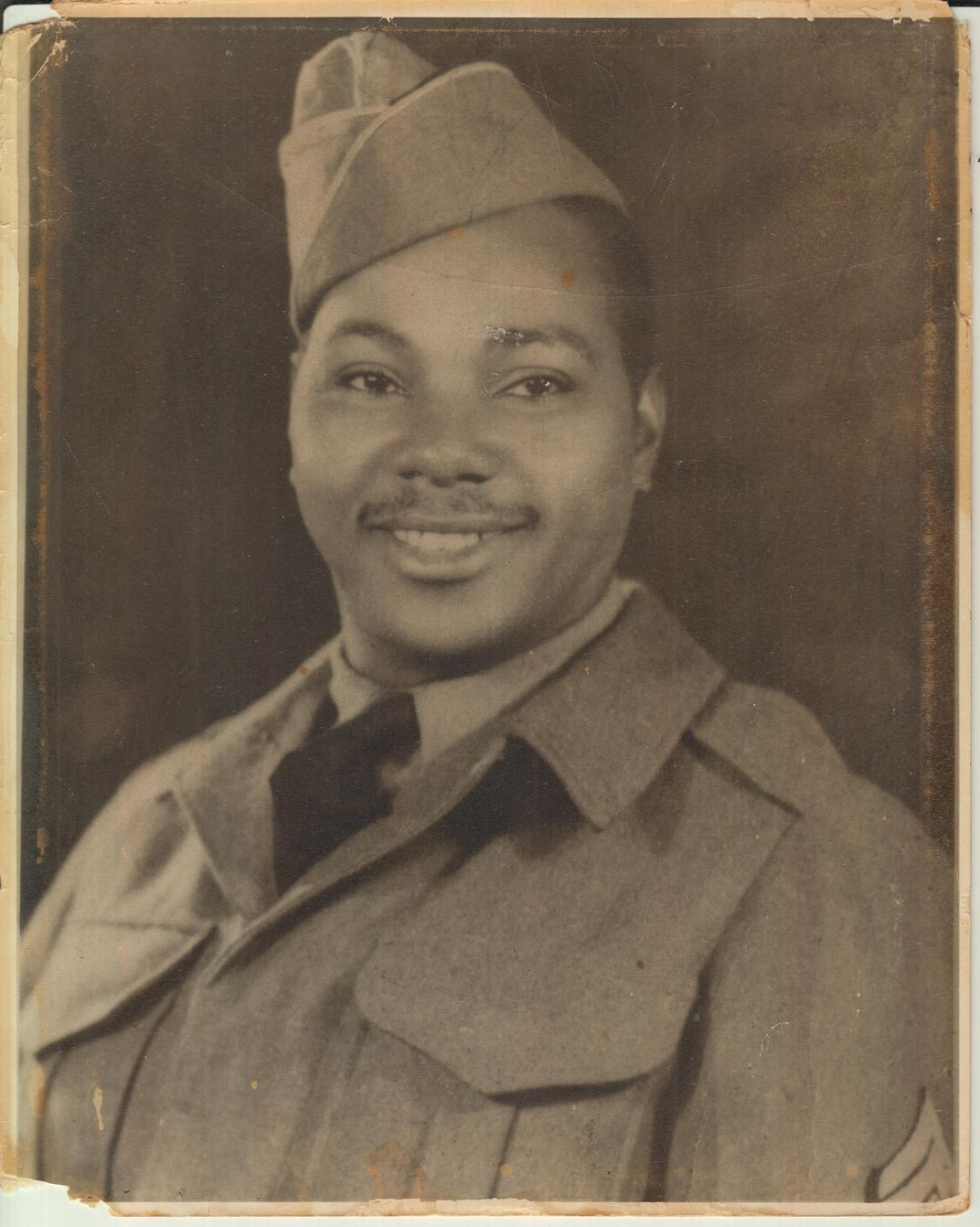
- Brooks in 1941
- Born: September 12, 1909; Norwood, Louisiana, US
- Died: January 5, 2022 (aged 112 years, 115 days); New Orleans, Louisiana, US
- Other name: Honey (nickname)
- Spouse: Leona Boyd Brooks
- Children: 6 (biological father of 4, stepfather of 2)
- Military career
- Allegiance: United States
- Branch: United States Army
- Service years: 1940–1945
- Rank: Private first class
- Unit: 91st Engineer Battalion
- Conflicts: World War II
- Awards: Asiatic Pacific Campaign Medal; Good Conduct Medal; Meritorious Service Medal; Presidential Unit Citation; WWII Victory Medal

Lawrence Nathanial Brooks (September 12, 1909 – January 5, 2022) was the oldest living man in the United States and the oldest known living American World War II veteran.

== Early life ==
Brooks was born on September 12, 1909, to Edward Brooks and Julia Bailey Brooks. He grew up in Norwood, Louisiana, and had 14 siblings. When he was an infant, the family moved to several cities closer to the Mississippi Delta, but he was raised primarily in the small town of Stephenson. He lived too far away from a school to attend one, so he was instead taught at home.

== Military service ==
Brooks was drafted into the army in 1940, when he was 31. At the time, he was employed at a sawmill. He was discharged in 1941, after a year of mandatory service, but he rejoined the army after the attack on Pearl Harbor. He served in the 91st Engineer Battalion in the United States Army in New Guinea and the Philippines during World War II. Brooks was a soldier in the Pacific Theatre from 1941 to 1945. He reached the rank of private first class.

Brooks's unit, an engineering corps, was tasked mainly with building infrastructure. The army was segregated during his service, and he was responsible for assisting white officers with daily tasks.

During a posting in Australia, Brooks said that he was treated better by the white people there than in the United States in the decades prior to the civil rights movement.

== Later life ==
After his military service, Brooks worked as a forklift operator in New Orleans until his retirement, and he had five children. His wife, Leona, died shortly after Hurricane Katrina. In the mid-2010s, The National WWII Museum began to host an annual birthday party for Brooks. In 2020, this celebration included a flyover of World War II aircraft above Brooks's house, with the museum's "Victory Belles", a trio of singers performing songs predominantly from the 1940s era. The city of New Orleans also recognized Brooks's birthday with an official proclamation.

=== Death ===
Brooks died on January 5, 2022, in his New Orleans home, aged 112 years and 115 days. His daughter, Vanessa Brooks, confirmed his death to magazine Military Times hours later. She said that he had been back and forth to the New Orleans VA Hospital in recent months. After his death, actor Gary Sinise posted a tribute on Twitter. Louisiana governor John Bel Edwards also posted, saying: "I am sorry to hear of the passing of Mr. Lawrence Brooks, America’s oldest World War II veteran and a proud Louisianan". President Joe Biden said Brooks was "truly the best of America".
