= Spillman, Louisiana =

- Unincorporated community
- Location within Louisiana Location within the United States
- Coordinates: 30°55′48″N 91°17′01″W
- Country: United States
- State: Louisiana
- Parish: West Feliciana
- Elevation: 256 ft (78 m)
- Time zone: UTC-6 (Central (CST))
  - Summer (DST): UTC-5 (CDT)
- Area code: 225
- GNIS feature ID: 541194

Spillman is an unincorporated community in West Feliciana Parish, Louisiana, United States.
