= Gloster Southern Railroad =

Overview
- Headquarters: Gloster, Mississippi
- Reporting mark: GLSR
- Locale: Gloster, Mississippi to Slaughter, Louisiana
- Dates of operation: 1987–2008

Technical
- Track gauge: 4 ft 8 1/2 in (1,435 mm) standard gauge

The Gloster Southern Railroad (reporting mark GLSR) was a United States shortline railroad that operated in Mississippi and Louisiana. The GLSR began operation in 1990 and provided freight service from Gloster, Mississippi, to the Illinois Central Railroad (now Canadian National) interchange at Slaughter, Louisiana.

The line was owned by Georgia-Pacific (GP) which had purchased and refurbished 35 miles (56 km) of an abandoned branch line to provide service to a GP oakwood mill in Gloster. The GLSR operated four or five freight trains per week until the plant closed in December 2002. One year later, Genesee & Wyoming acquired three short-line railroads from GP. However, this sale did not include the GLSR.

In September 2004, GP announced that they would re-open the Gloster oakwood mill. However, they did not continue to operate the GLSR. The McComb Enterprise Journal reported on April 2, 2008, that the Georgia-Pacific Corporation is closing its railroad and that the town of Gloster was interested in the rail bed.

The Gloster Southern Railroad applied to discontinue service on its entire line in December 2009, and crews began removing the railway and roadbed. By June 2013, it was reported that all of the track had been moved and sold for recycling.

== Equipment ==
No.	Builder	Build Date	Model	Purchase Date	Photo
1501	AT&SF #17954	May 1953	CF7	04/86	
1502	AT&SF		CF7		Photo
903	AT&SF		SW900		
