= Wilson, Louisiana =

- Village
- Location of Wilson in East Feliciana Parish, Louisiana.

- Location of Louisiana in the United States
- Coordinates: 30°55′12″N 91°06′57″W
- Country: United States
- State: Louisiana
- Parish: East Feliciana

Area
  - Total: 2.72 sq mi (7.05 km^{2})
  - Land: 2.71 sq mi (7.02 km^{2})
  - Water: 0.012 sq mi (0.03 km^{2})
- Elevation: 272 ft (83 m)

Population (2020)
  - Total: 348
  - Density: 128.4/sq mi (49.57/km^{2})
- Time zone: UTC-6 (CST)
  - Summer (DST): UTC-5 (CDT)
- Area code: 225
- FIPS code: 22-82215
- GNIS feature ID: 2407571

Wilson is a village in East Feliciana Parish, Louisiana, United States. The population was 348 in 2020. It is part of the Baton Rouge metropolitan statistical area.

== Geography ==
Wilson is located in northwestern East Feliciana Parish. Louisiana Highway 19 passes through the village, leading north 3.5 miles (5.6 km) to Norwood and south 35 miles (56 km) to Baton Rouge. Clinton, the East Feliciana Parish seat, is 8 miles (13 km) to the southeast.

According to the United States Census Bureau, Wilson has a total area of 2.7 square miles (7.0 km^{2}), of which 0.01 square miles (0.02 km^{2}), or 0.42%, is water.

== Demographics ==
Historical population
Census	Pop.	Note	%±
1890	281		—
1900	470		67.3%
1910	762		62.1%
1920	470		−38.3%
1930	354		−24.7%
1970	606		—
1980	656		8.3%
1990	707		7.8%
2000	668		−5.5%
2010	595		−10.9%
2020	348		−41.5%
2025 (est.)	357	▲	2.6%
U.S. Decennial Census

Wilson racial composition as of 2020
Race	Number	Percentage
White (non-Hispanic)	70	20.11%
Black or African American (non-Hispanic)	259	74.43%
Other/Mixed	11	3.16%
Hispanic or Latino	8	2.3%

As of the 2020 United States census, there were 348 people, 202 households, and 120 families residing in the village.
