= Norwood, Louisiana =

- Village
- Location of Norwood in East Feliciana Parish, Louisiana.

- Location of Louisiana in the United States
- Coordinates: 30°58′09″N 91°07′23″W
- Country: United States
- State: Louisiana
- Parish: East Feliciana

Area
  - Total: 4.10 sq mi (10.62 km^{2})
  - Land: 4.08 sq mi (10.58 km^{2})
  - Water: 0.015 sq mi (0.04 km^{2})
- Elevation: 312 ft (95 m)

Population (2020)
  - Total: 279
  - Density: 68.3/sq mi (26.38/km^{2})
- Time zone: UTC-6 (CST)
  - Summer (DST): UTC-5 (CDT)
- Area code: 225
- FIPS code: 22-56295
- GNIS feature ID: 2407514
- Website: norwood.municipalimpact.com

Norwood is a village in East Feliciana Parish, Louisiana, United States. As of the 2020 census, Norwood had a population of 279. It is part of the Baton Rouge metropolitan statistical area.

== Geography ==
Norwood is located in northwestern East Feliciana Parish. Louisiana Highway 19 passes through the village, leading south 39 miles (63 km) to Baton Rouge and north 2 miles (3 km) to the Mississippi border. Centreville, Mississippi, and Clinton, the East Feliciana Parish seat, is 10 miles (16 km) to the southeast.

According to the United States Census Bureau, Norwood has a total area of 4.1 square miles (10.6 km^{2}), of which 0.02 square miles (0.04 km^{2}), or 0.40%, is water.

== Demographics ==
Historical population
Census	Pop.	Note	%±
1950	414		—
1960	427		3.1%
1970	348		−18.5%
1980	421		21.0%
1990	317		−24.7%
2000	337		6.3%
2010	322		−4.5%
2020	279		−13.4%
2025 (est.)	261	▼	−6.5%
U.S. Decennial Census

Norwood racial composition as of 2020
Race	Number	Percentage
White (non-Hispanic)	217	77.78%
Black or African American (non-Hispanic)	60	21.51%
Hispanic or Latino	2	0.72%

As of the 2020 United States census, there were 279 people, 127 households, and 71 families residing in the village.

== Notable person ==
- Lawrence Brooks (1909-2022), the oldest American veteran of World War II, was born in Norwood.
