= Slaughter, Louisiana =

- Town
- Town of Slaughter
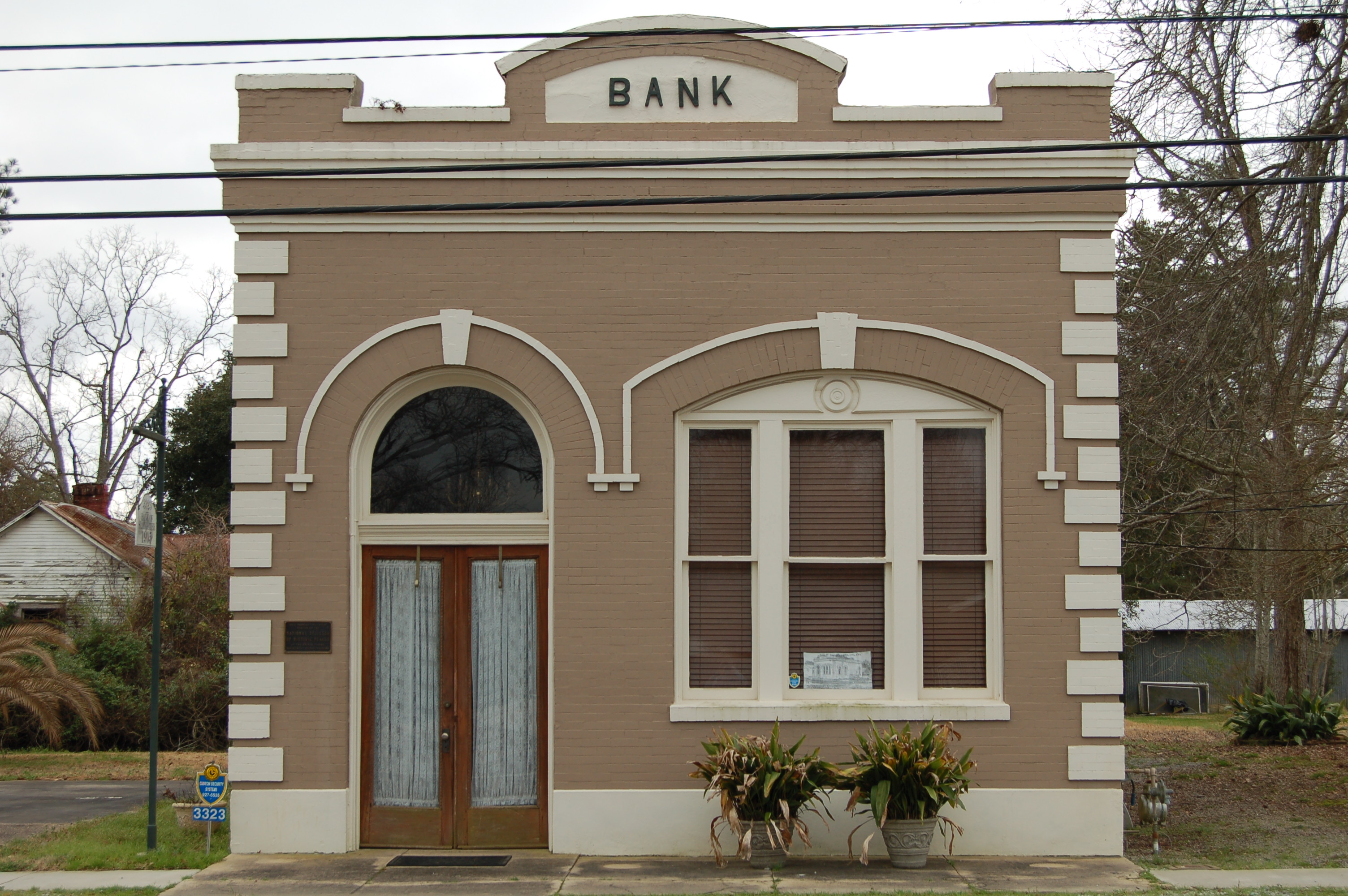
- The historic Bank of Slaughter

- Location of Slaughter in East Feliciana Parish, Louisiana.

- Location of Louisiana in the United States
- Coordinates: 30°43′19″N 91°07′50″W
- Country: United States
- State: Louisiana
- Parish: East Feliciana
- Founded: 1889

Government
  - Mayor: Janis Landry
  - Police Chief: Walter Smith

Area
  - Total: 5.47 sq mi (14.18 km^{2})
  - Land: 5.47 sq mi (14.16 km^{2})
  - Water: 0.0077 sq mi (0.02 km^{2})
- Elevation: 128 ft (39 m)

Population (2020)
  - Total: 1,035
  - Density: 189.4/sq mi (73.11/km^{2})
- Time zone: UTC-6 (CST)
  - Summer (DST): UTC-5 (CDT)
- ZIP code: 70777
- Area code: 225
- FIPS code: 22-70770
- GNIS feature ID: 2407349
- Website: www.townofslaughter.org

Slaughter is a town in East Feliciana Parish, Louisiana, United States. As of the 2020 census, Slaughter had a population of 1,035. Slaughter is part of the Baton Rouge metropolitan statistical area.

== History ==
The area was originally called Belzara, which was named after the post office in the area. The community was later called Burnsville, in honor of the land surveyor who cut the railroad right-of-way through the area. The town's name is from an Illinois Central Railroad Depot for the farm of the Slaughter family. The town was incorporated as "Slaughter" in 1889. The Gloster Southern Railroad served the town from 1987 to 2008. figures in the title of Michael Ondaatje's novel about jazz player Buddy Bolden entitled Coming Through Slaughter. Slaughter was designated a town in 2002.

== Geography ==
Slaughter is located along the southern edge of East Feliciana Parish. The town is bordered on the south by the city of Zachary in East Baton Rouge Parish.

Louisiana Highway 19 passes through Slaughter, leading north 15 miles (24 km) to Wilson and south 20 miles (32 km) to Baton Rouge. Clinton, the East Feliciana Parish seat, is 14 miles (23 km) to the northeast.

According to the United States Census Bureau, Slaughter has a total area of 5.5 square miles (14.2 km^{2}), of which 0.01 square miles (0.02 km^{2}), or 0.16%, is water.

== Demographics ==
Historical population
| Census | Pop. | Note | %± |
|---|---|---|---|
| 1900 | 259 | | — |
| 1910 | 287 | | 10.8% |
| 1920 | 215 | | −25.1% |
| 1930 | 327 | | 52.1% |
| 1940 | 306 | | −6.4% |
| 1950 | 290 | | −5.2% |
| 1960 | 403 | | 39.0% |
| 1970 | 580 | | 43.9% |
| 1980 | 729 | | 25.7% |
| 1990 | 827 | | 13.4% |
| 2000 | 1,011 | | 22.2% |
| 2010 | 997 | | −1.4% |
| 2020 | 1,035 | | 3.8% |
| 2025 (est.) | 975 | ▼ | −5.8% |
U.S. Decennial Census

Slaughter racial composition as of 2020
| Race | Number | Percentage |
|---|---|---|
| White (non-Hispanic) | 878 | 84.83% |
| Black or African American (non-Hispanic) | 70 | 6.76% |
| Native American | 6 | 0.58% |
| Asian | 3 | 0.29% |
| Pacific Islander | 2 | 0.19% |
| Other/Mixed | 57 | 5.51% |
| Hispanic or Latino | 19 | 1.84% |

As of the 2020 United States census, 1,035 people, 435 households, and 298 families reside in the town. At the 2019 American Community Survey, 87.6% of the population were non-Hispanic white, 8.0% Black and African American, 1.4% two or more races, and 3.1% Hispanic and Latin American of any race. The town had a median age of 48.1.

At the 2000 U.S. census, there were 1,011 people, 359 households, and 286 families residing in the village. The population density was 184.3 inhabitants per square mile (71.2/km^{2}). There were 376 housing units at an average density of 68.6 per square mile (26.5/km^{2}). The racial makeup of the village was 94.56% White, 3.56% African American, 0.99% Native American, 0.10% Asian, 0.40% from other races, and 0.40% from two or more races. Hispanic or Latino of any race were 0.79% of the population.

There were 359 households, out of which 38.2% had children under the age of 18 living with them, 64.6% were married couples living together, 8.9% had a female householder with no husband present, and 20.1% were non-families. 16.7% of all households were made up of individuals, and 7.5% had someone living alone who was 65 years of age or older. The average household size was 2.82, and the average family size was 3.17.

The village's population was spread out, with 28.8% under the age of 18, 7.9% from 18 to 24, 30.8% from 25 to 44, 24.8% from 45 to 64, and 7.7% who were 65 years of age or older. The median age was 33. For every 100 females, there were 101.8 males. For every 100 females age 18 and over, there were 98.3 males.

The median income for a household in the village was $44,896, and the median income for a family was $46,932. Males had a median income of $34,375 versus $21,141 for females. The village's per capita income was $17,457. About 3.4% of families and 3.5% of the population were below the poverty line, including 3.1% of those under age 18 and 5.7% of those age 65 or over.

== Education ==
East Feliciana Parish School Board serves Slaughter. Slaughter Elementary School and Slaughter Community Charter School are located in Slaughter.
