= Bluff Creek, Louisiana =

- Unincorporated community
- Location within Louisiana Location within the United States
- Coordinates: 30°44′48″N 90°51′26″W
- Country: United States
- State: Louisiana
- Parish: East Feliciana
- Elevation: 125 ft (38 m)
- Time zone: UTC-6 (Central (CST))
  - Summer (DST): UTC-5 (CDT)
- Area code: 225
- GNIS feature ID: 533244

Bluff Creek is an unincorporated community in East Feliciana Parish, Louisiana, United States.
