= Gurley, Louisiana =

- Unincorporated community
- Location within Louisiana Location within the United States
- Coordinates: 30°52′10″N 91°08′02″W
- Country: United States
- State: Louisiana
- Parish: East Feliciana
- Elevation: 207 ft (63 m)
- GNIS feature ID: 554633

Gurley is an unincorporated community in East Feliciana Parish, Louisiana, United States, on Louisiana Highway 963. Gurley is located ten miles from the state of Mississippi.

== Education ==
Gurley is served by the East Feliciana Parish School Board headquartered in Clinton.

== Historical significance ==
Gurley is the location of Oakland Plantation House, a site listed on the National Register of Historic Places.

== Businesses ==
According to the Gurley Chamber of Commerce, there are 506 businesses.
