= Wildwood =

Wildwood and Wild Wood may refer to:

== Populated places ==
=== Australia ===
- Wildwood, Victoria, a suburb of Melbourne

=== Canada ===
- Wildwood, Alberta, a hamlet
- Wildwood, Calgary, Alberta, a neighborhood
- Wildwood, Saskatoon, Saskatchewan
- Wildwood Park, Winnipeg, Manitoba

=== United States ===
- Wildwood, California
  - Lake Wildwood, California
- Wildwood, Florida
- Wildwood, Georgia
- Wildwood, Chicago, Illinois
- Wildwood, Indiana
- Wildwood, Kentucky
- Wildwood, Michigan, an unincorporated community
- Wildwood, Charlevoix County, Michigan, an unincorporated community
- Wildwood, Cheboygan County, Michigan, an unincorporated community
- Wildwood, Minnesota
- Wildwood, Missouri
- Wildwood, New Hampshire, a former village
- Wildwood, New Jersey
- Wildwood, Oregon, in Clackamas County
- Wildwood, Oregon, in Lane County
- Wildwood, Pennsylvania
- Wildwood, Roanoke, Virginia
- Wildwood, Washington
- Wildwood, Wisconsin

== Parks and recreation areas ==
- Wildwood Discovery Park, a wildlife park in Kent, England
- Wildwood Park for the Arts, an arts venue and gardens in Little Rock, Arkansas, United States
- Wildwood Preserve Metropark, Toledo, Ohio, United States
- Wildwood Recreation Site, Wildwood, Clackamas County, Oregon
- Wildwood Regional Park, a park in Thousand Oaks, California, United States
- Wildwood State Park, Long Island, New York, United States

== Buildings in the United States ==
- Wildwood Correctional Complex, a prison complex near Kenai, Alaska
- Wildwood (Hot Springs, Arkansas), listed on the NRHP in Arkansas
- Wildwood School, a school in Los Angeles, California
- Wildwood Farm, Skylight, Kentucky, listed on the NRHP in Kentucky
- Wildwood Plantation House, Jackson, Louisiana, listed on the NRHP in Louisiana
- Wildwood Cottage, Harrisville, New Hampshire
- Wildwood (Semora, North Carolina), a historic home
- Wildwood House (Ferguson, Missouri), a style house
- Wildwood Hall, Newbury, Vermont, listed on the NRHP in Vermont
- Wildwood Park Elementary, a school in Puyallup, Washington
- Wildwood (Beckley, West Virginia), a historic home
- Wild Wood High School (disambiguation), multiple schools

== Types of landscape ==
- British wildwood, an ancient natural landscape of post-ice age Britain

== Music ==
- "The Church in the Wildwood", a song by William S. Pitts
- Wild Wood, a solo record by Paul Weller
- "Wildwood Flower", a traditional American folk song often associated with the Carter Family

== Books ==
- Wildwood: The Wildwood Chronicles, Book 1, a children's fantasy novel by Colin Meloy, illustrated by Carson Ellis.
- Under Wildwood: The Wildwood Chronicles, Book 2, a children's fantasy novel by Colin Meloy, illustrated by Carson Ellis.
- Wildwood Imperium: The Wildwood Chronicles, Book 3, a children's fantasy novel by Colin Meloy, illustrated by Carson Ellis.

== Films ==
- Wildwood (film), a 2026 film based on the novel series

== Ships ==
- Wildwood (PC-1181), a US Navy submarine chaser during World War II

== Businesses ==
- Wildwood Enterprises, Inc, a film and television production company co-founded by Robert Redford
- Wildwood Kitchen, a British casual dining chain

== See also ==
- Wildewood, Maryland
