= Wildwood House =

Wildwood House may refer to:

== Places ==
in the United States (by state)

- Wildwood Farm, Skylight, KY, listed on the NRHP in Oldham County, Kentucky
- Wildwood Plantation House, Jackson, Louisiana, listed on the NRHP in East Feliciana Parish, Louisiana
- Wildwood House (Ferguson, Missouri), listed on the NRHP in St. Louis County, Missouri
- Wildwood Cottage, Harrisville, New Hampshire, listed on the NRHP in Cheshire County, New Hampshire
- Wildwood Hall, Newbury, Vermont, listed on the NRHP in Orange County, Vermont

== Publisher ==
- Wildwood House (publisher), a London-based publishing house

== See also ==
- Wildwood (disambiguation)
