= Wolfenbarger Site =

NRHP-listed site in Lewis County, Washington

- U.S. National Register of Historic Places
- Washington State Heritage Register
- Location within Washington (state)
- Location: Address restricted
- Nearest city: Curtis, Washington
- Coordinates: 46°35′13″N 123°06′36″W
- Area: less than one acre
- NRHP reference No.: 77001346
- Added to NRHP: May 2, 1977

The Wolfenbarger Site, located near Curtis, Washington, is an archaeological site of the Kwalhioqua–Clatskanie people, and during the early 20th century, part of the Klaber Hop Fields farm of Herman Klaber. The site has been listed on the National Register of Historic Places (NRHP) since 1977.

The site was once a domestic village of the Willapa people with habitation noted between the years 1000 and 1499. The restricted grounds, measuring 9 m × 60 m (30 ft × 197 ft), is located on a creek bank and considered mostly undisturbed, a rarity for an archaeological site in Washington state.

== History ==
The land was once settled by the Kwalhioqua–Clatskanie people, also known as the Willapa or Willoopah. The Willapa used the area as a domestic village and for agriculture.

Artifacts from the Wolfenbarger Site were proposed to be stored in a museum setting at the Boistfort High School, a neighboring NRHP-listed schoolhouse, as a means to keep the school open during the late 1970s after a levy failure.

== Site ==
The address to the grounds is restricted but the site is described as located on a terraced bank of Beaver Creek approximately 2 miles (3.2 km) south of the unincorporated community of Curtis. The site is 9 m × 60 m (30 ft × 197 ft) and near the time of its addition to the NRHP, was summarized to contain trees such as Douglas fir and red cedar with some oak and alder. The land was covered in various plant species including bracken fern, Oregon grape, and salal. The underbrush was noted to have a composted layer up to 7 cm (2.8 in) thick and the alluvial soil considered advantageous for farming.

== Significance ==
The Wolfenbarger Site covers a period of indigenous habitation of the area between years of 1000 and 1499. The small parcel is also acknowledged as part of the region's hops production in the Curtis-Klaber-Boistfort agricultural valley between 1920 and 1924, specifically Klaber Hop Fields under ownership of prominent hops merchant, Herman Klaber. (Note: A few sources mention that the Klaber Hop Fields were placed on the National Register of Historic Places (NRHP) in 1977. As of 2026, no documentation exists to support the claim. The point of the discrepancy may be due to the Wolfenbarger Site's location near the community of Klaber and the protected grounds partially overlapping the hop yards.) The site was noted as being "virtually undisturbed", a rarity for archaeological sites in Southwest Washington.

The area was protected under the National Register of Historic Places on May 2, 1977. The site is also listed with the Washington State Heritage Register.
