= Kwalhioqua–Clatskanie people =

Kwalhioqua-Clatskanie
Total population
- assimilated into Coast Salish

Regions with significant populations
- southwestern Washington

Languages
- Kwalhioqua-Clatskanie

The Willapa or Willoopah, also known as Kwalhioqua / Kwalhiokwa, were a Northern Athapaskan-speaking people in southwestern Washington, United States. Their territory was the valley of the Willapa River and the prairie between the headwaters of the Chehalis and Cowlitz Rivers.

Together with the Clatskanie people (also: Tlatskanai / Klatskanai, according to tradition originally part of the "Suwal/Swaal" subgroup) in the upper Nehalem River Valley and along the headwaters of the Klaskanine and Clatskanie River in northwestern Oregon they spoke dialects of the now extinct Kwalhioqua-Clatskanie (Kwalhioqua–Tlatskanai) language, the Willapa dialect was the most divergent. The Kwalhioqua lived north of the lower Columbia River, the Clatskanie (Tlatskanai) to the south, separated by the territory of the Lower Chinook-speaking Shoalwater Bay Chinook (or Willapa Chinook) or Clatsop and the Kathlamet (Cathlamet), who spoke another Chinookan variant. The Kwalhioqua–Clatskanie people were dispersed among Coast Salish peoples in the 19th century and their language was extinct before the 1930s."

The Willapa or Kwalhioqua had two subdivisions or subgroups:

- the Suwal or Swaal (or "Upper Willapa River Valley Kwalhioqua") on headwaters of the Chehalis River - called by the Lower Cowlitz and Upper Chehalis Owhillapsh.
- the Wela'pakote'li or Willapa (or "Lower Willapa River Valley Kwalhioqua") on Willapa River - called by the Lower Cowlitz and Upper Chehalis Swilaumsh.

== Archaeology ==
The Wolfenbarger Site is a protected archaeological site of the Willapa people near Curtis, Washington. The small parcel is part of a larger residential village that existed between 1000 and 1499. The exact location is restricted to the public and considered "virtually undisturbed". It has been listed on the National Register of Historic Places since 1977.
