= Ceres, Washington =

Former community in Lewis County, Washington

- Former community, locale
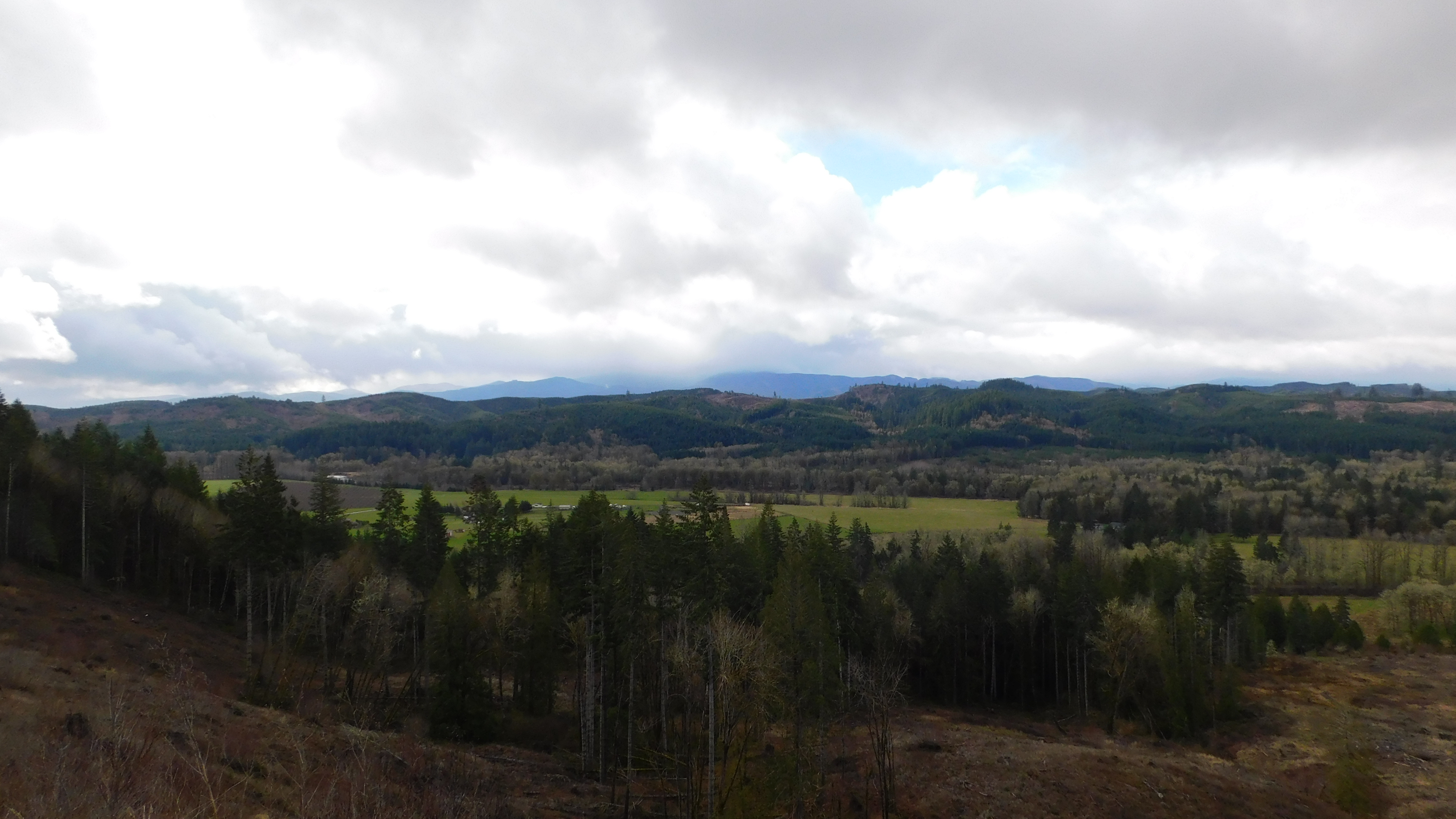
- View of valley from Ceres Hill, 2025

- Location within Washington (state) Location within the United States
- Coordinates: 46°36′28″N 123°09′12″W
- Country: United States
- State: Washington
- County: Lewis
- Elevation: 240 ft (73 m)
- Time zone: UTC-8 (Pacific (PST))
  - Summer (DST): UTC-7 (PDT)
- ZIP Code: 98532
- Area code(s): 360, 564

Ceres, also known as Ceres Hill, was a former farming and railroad depot community and is a locale in Lewis County, in the U.S. state of Washington. The area is located off Washington State Route 6 in a bend of the Chehalis River. The Willapa Hills Trail bisects the former community.

== History ==
The area began with a train depot known as Long's Crossing and was a rail stop on the South Bend line for Northern Pacific Railroad. Across from the station, the town grew to include a general store. The large depot was a prominent marker on the rail, painted red and often busy due to the farming of hops in the area. The community was eventually named by the Northern Pacific Railroad after Ceres, the Roman goddess of agriculture, due to the fertile soil in the area.

By the late 1890s, the rail stop became known as Ceres station, and the first iteration of the Ceres Bridge was constructed at the turn of the 20th century. In the 1890s, the area became a logging site and a splash dam was built in 1897, but destroyed later that year after a large flood event. A steamboat, named the "Carrie Davis", operated out of Ceres during its early history, ferrying passengers and goods to the Skookumchuck River. (Note: The dates the steamer operated are unclear but it was owned by an early pioneer in the Adna-Claquato region, J.T. Browning. See source listed.)

Ceres began to grow in the new century, with the build of a grocery store in August 1908; the post office was established in the store in October of that year. Telephone lines were installed in 1911 to "intermediate houses of note", with reports that Ceres residents were delighted. Timber harvesting continued in the community into the late 1910s, with the area supporting a logging camp. Approximately 300 feet (91.4 m) of the Northern Pacific tracks in Ceres were torn away in early-January 1914 after a landslide caused by heavy rainfall. Peaking in the 1920s, Ceres residents began the Ceres Improvement Club, which had their own hall.

Known as an agriculture community with a small population, Ceres was often described as a farming district beginning in the 1920s, and sometimes referred to as a neighborhood. By the 1930s, Ceres became synonymous with the moniker, Ceres Hill, and reporting in the 1960s classified the community as an area.

After disastrous floods to the region due to the Great Coastal Gale of 2007, reporting provided details on infrastructure and residential damages in the Ceres Hill Road area, but does not mention Ceres as a town or community.

=== Post office ===
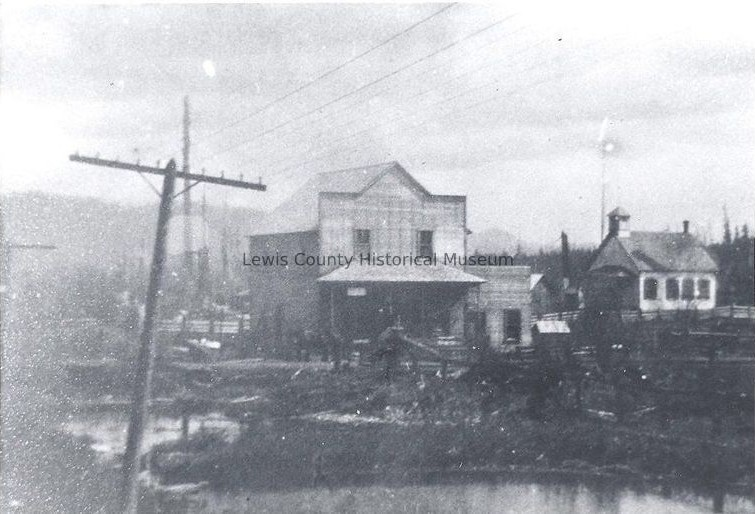
Ceres post office and school, c. 1909

A post office called Ceres was first established between 1892 and 1893 and another official office was begun in 1908 inside the newly constructed grocery store; it remained in operation until 1931. The office began as a pigeon-hole messagebox but by the 1920s, the Ceres postmaster was in charge of a route that delivered mail three days a week to surrounding towns such as Boistfort, the neighboring communities of Doty and Dryad, and went as far west as Pe Ell. Residents could sign up with the Ceres office, and postal workers were legally required to exchange and deliver mail from registered members on the route.

By 1930, the route was removed and mail was available for pickup in Chehalis; the Ceres postmaster resigned at the end of the year. Attempts were made to hire a new head of the post office, and the Ceres route was reintegrated to the Chehalis delivery circuit, but a new Ceres postmaster was never hired as "the compensation is so small no one will take the position permanently". The Ceres post office was officially announced as closed, May 29, 1931.

== Geography ==
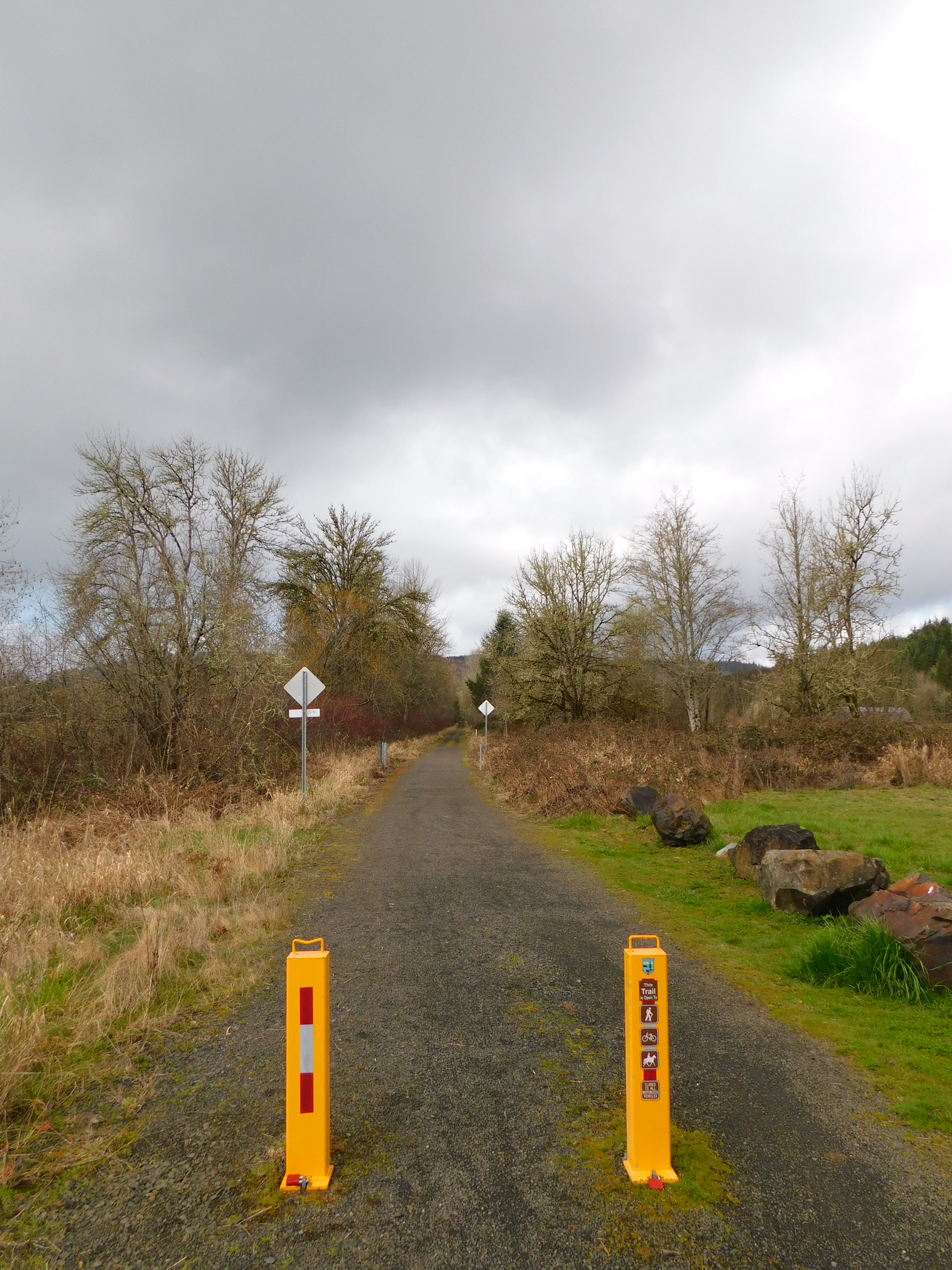
Willapa Hills Trailhead at Ceres, 2025

Ceres is located approximately 12 miles (19 km) west of Chehalis and the area is known for its fertile soil. In the early days of settlement, the region in which Ceres is located was referred to as King's prairie.

== Education ==
The Ceres community is first mentioned as having a school in 1900, where a musical performance was held by students from the state juvenile detention center, Green Hill School. By 1910, Ceres hosted two schools and districts, given the numbers 67 and 138. The Ceres school No. 67 was part of consolidated district, but legally separated from such in 1917 and joined with No. 138. The student population was never large, with the total number of pupils once recorded as 15 in 1918. The school closed before the 1936–1937 school year as a new road built by the Public Works Administration allowed Ceres students to travel to nearby Klaber, Washington.

== Economy ==
The region was known for its farming and agricultural use. Ceres was particularly known for the cultivation of hops, with a farmer once receiving an award from a show in New York City. Ceres was also a large producer of prized Holstein cows, setting a world record in 1933 for the number of birthed calves.
