= Klaber, Washington =

Former community in Lewis County, Washington

- Former community, unincorporated place
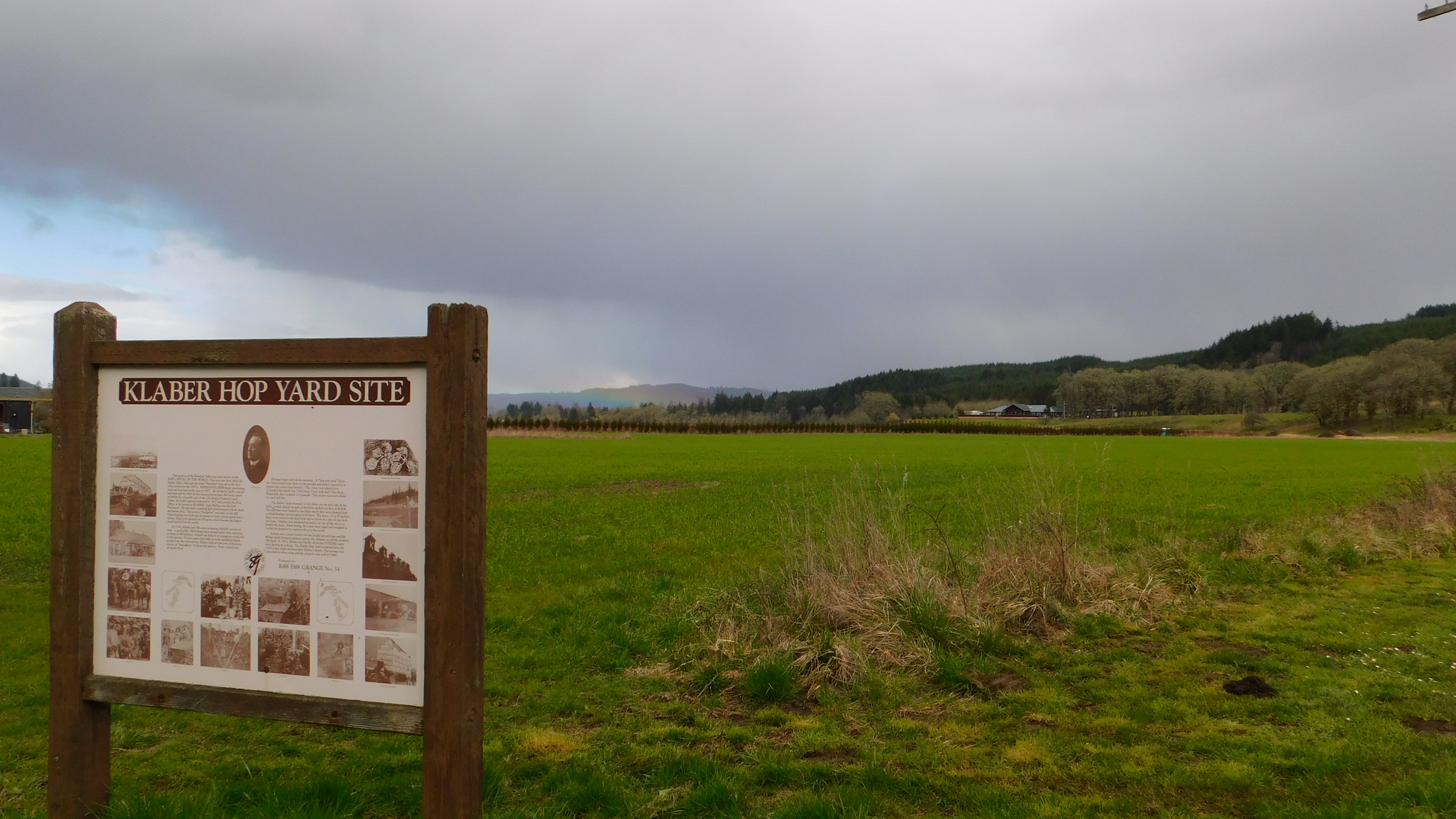
- Interpretive sign, Klaber Hop Fields, 2025
- Nickname: "Hops Capital of the World"
- Location within Washington (state) Location within the United States
- Coordinates: 46°33′42.37″N 123°07′40.48″W
- Country: United States
- State: Washington
- County: Lewis

Area
  - Land: 0.5625 sq mi (1.457 km^{2})
- Elevation: 243 ft (74 m)
- Time zone: UTC-8 (Pacific (PST))
  - Summer (DST): UTC-7 (PDT)
- Area code(s): 360, 564
- GNIS feature ID: 1511073

Klaber, a former community and company town, is a locale and unincorporated place in Lewis County, in the U.S. state of Washington. The area is located near the South Fork Chehalis River and is situated between the communities of Curtis and Boistfort, Washington. Klaber has also been considered to be a ghost town.

The community was formed by hops merchant, Herman Klaber, as he began purchasing land in the Boistfort Valley in 1903 for the purpose to create a hops farm and company town. A post office was officially established in 1906 under the name, Klaberville. The town was renamed to Klaber the following year. The Klaber Hop Fields, along with a drying kiln and employee housing, were constructed. The hop yard, encompassing 200 acres (81 ha), and the kiln, were considered at the time to be largest of their types in the Pacific Northwest and perhaps in the United States.

Ongoing issues with insects and mildew, along with poor weather for the crop, led to consistent problems in growing hops in Klaber. Herman Klaber died during the sinking of the Titanic in 1912. His death led to mismanagement at the fields, and financial struggles brought on by World War I and the Prohibition era, led to further business difficulties. The Klaber Hop Field shuttered in 1945 and the community began to wane.

A wooden historical sign denoting the Klaber community and hop growing history is located at the edge of the original Klaber Hop Field next to Boistfort Elementary School. The non-native hopbush from the Klaber fields have spread throughout the region.

== History ==
=== Indigenous history ===
The Boistfort Valley was settled by a distinct, isolated group of Athapaskans, the Kwalhioqua. The indigenous group arrived approximately 3,000 years before the Klaber community was formed. Known as "fierce mountain people", the Kwalhioqua's language and customs were noted to be much different than that of surrounding Native American tribes.

Despite being in an isolated environment that protected the Kwalhioqua from epidemics that decimated other native groups, the tribe was considered to have lost their separate identity, or to be extinct in the area, by the mid-1800s. The cause is theorized to be due to a combination of "venereal disease and intermarriage" and being grouped with other indigenous cultures during the early formations of the Chehalis Reservation.

=== Klaber settlement ===
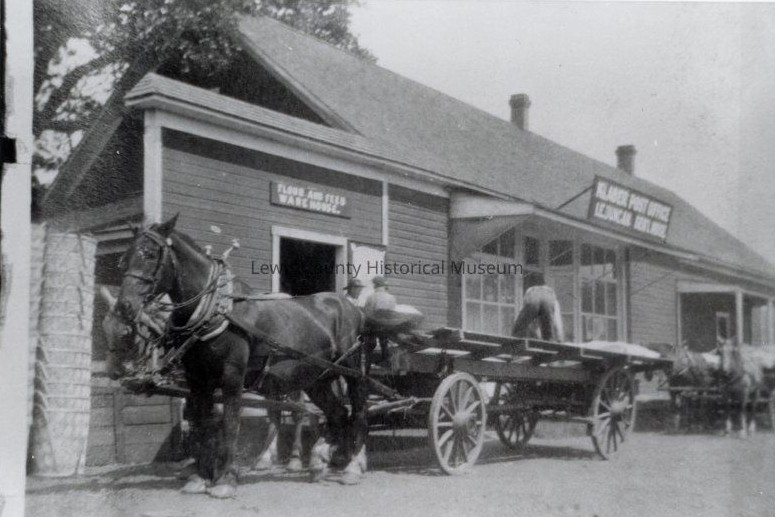
Klaber Post Office, circa 1900s

The community of Klaber, known as the "Hops Capital of the World", was founded in 1906 by hops broker, Herman Klaber. Klaber, with the intent to grow hops, began buying up donation land claims in the Boistfort Valley near the South Fork Chehalis River; his initial purchase was 80 acres (32 ha) in 1903 from C.W. Maynard. He eventually obtained a total of 360 acres (150 ha) that included additional tracts from the Hogue and Roundtree families.

His last acquisitions were noted to have been finalized by June 1906 during which he submitted an application to create a post office named "Klaberville". He immediately began constructing a barn, home, and four kilns. Further investing $75,000, equivalent to $2,687,500 in 2025, to build a community he wished to initially call Klaberville, the hops merchant had 200 acres (81 ha) planted with hops on the land claim of the Hogue family. The hopyard, at its beginning, was considered the largest in the Pacific Northwest and perhaps in the United States. Klaber also ordered the planting of an orchard along with the build of a 920-square-foot (85 m^{2}) general store that contained a barber shop, blacksmith shop, meeting hall, and the new post office.

The attempt to create a Klaberville post office was protested by residents of Boistfort in November 1906; the post office was moved and established in Klaberville in early December. In April 1907, the post office, which had existed and named for Boistfort for almost 50 years at the time, was renamed Klaber; government officials were convinced to do so by Herman Klaber.

The town had a small population, recording 80 residents in 1910, but the census grew to over 2,000 during the annual hop harvesting seasons. Described as a company town, Klaber also had a ten-room home for the manager of the hop field, and a two-story house for the assistant. Hot and cold water was provided by a gravity well and reservoir tank system, accessing a nearby spring. The telephone system in the town was privately owned and Klaber did not have a fire department; calls for emergencies used a special ring tone to alert other members of the community, all of whom could overhear telephone conversations on the single line. The service was upgraded to dial tone in 1956.

West Side School principal, Ira (Asa) Whittaker, died during the 1908 school year after accidentally shooting himself during a hunting trip at Klaber. Five children belonging to the Rhodes family in Klaber died in February 1922 after an accidental poisoning. The children, ranging between 3 and 10 years of age, had been given what was supposed to be epsom salts by Bessie Rhodes, their mother. Mrs. Rhodes was noted to suffer from anxiety over having further children after several miscarriages, as well as "female troubles", but was found innocent by a jury. The cause or responsibility of the poisoning remains unknown. The children were buried in separate coffins at the Boistfort cemetery. (Note: Reporting of the Rhodes children poisoning often spells the community as Claber. See The Bakersfield Californian source listed as an example.)

=== Community withers ===
After the hop fields closed in 1945, the town "withered and died". The two-story, 40 ft × 100 ft (12 m × 30 m) Klaber Post Office ceased operations after it burned down in September 1958. The cause of fire, with an estimated loss more than $15,000 (equivalent to $167,388 in 2025), was undetermined. (Note: By 1920, the Klaber Post Office was considered "fourth-class". A postmaster at the time earned an annual salary of $205 (equivalent to $3,295 in 2025).) A fire district was created to cover the Curtis and Klaber area in 1962. The department was housed in a building donated by Weyerhaeuser located in Boistfort.

=== 21st century ===
By 2001, the community's existence was reported to be noted only by a wooden historical sign located at the edge of the original hop field next to Boistfort Elementary School. The community of Klaber has sometimes been described in the intervening decades as a ghost town.

An alcoholic beverage known as Klaber Fair Beer has been manufactured by Dick's Brewing Company. The beer was named in honor of the community, Herman Klaber, and the extinct hop farm. It had been served at the Southwest Washington Fair beginning in 2009. A descendant Klaber hop that grows invasively in the region, and cultivated at the fairgrounds, was used in the brewing process.

== Herman Klaber ==
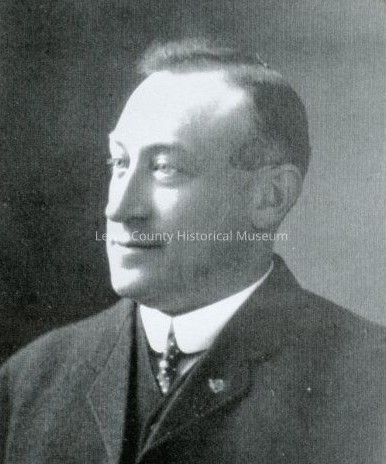
Herman Klaber, circa 1905-1910

Herman Klaber became known under several monikers including the "Hop King of Lewis County", "Hop King", or "King of Hops".

After beginning his career as a hops merchant, Klaber created the Herman Klaber Company, buying thousands of pounds of hops along the West Coast of the United States. He married Gertrude Ginsburg in February 1907. In addition to his field in "Klaberville", he also owned a hop farm approximately 1.5 miles (2.4 km) southwest of Chehalis.

During the picking season, Herman Klaber lived in a large, two-story bungalow featuring a wraparound porch situated upon a hillock that overlooked the hop field and community. (Note: Klaber referred to his hop field home as "the ranch".) Five cottages were built for his servants. By 2001, his house in Klaber remained; most of the original details were lost after it was remodeled to offset damage from prior renters. A bathroom and outhouse used by hop pickers was noted to remain and several artifacts have been found on the property.

Herman Klaber, a first-class passenger on the Titanic, died during the sinking of the ocean liner on April 15, 1912; his remains were either not recovered or not identified. (Note: Whether or not Klaber's body was recovered, or unidentified, is disputed in reports. See sources in the section for the discrepancy.)

His wife sold the Klaber home, and any personal property that remained, vowing never to return to the hop field company town. Gertrude Klaber, who never remarried, died on March 17, 1961.

== Klaber Hop Fields ==
=== Beginnings and success ===
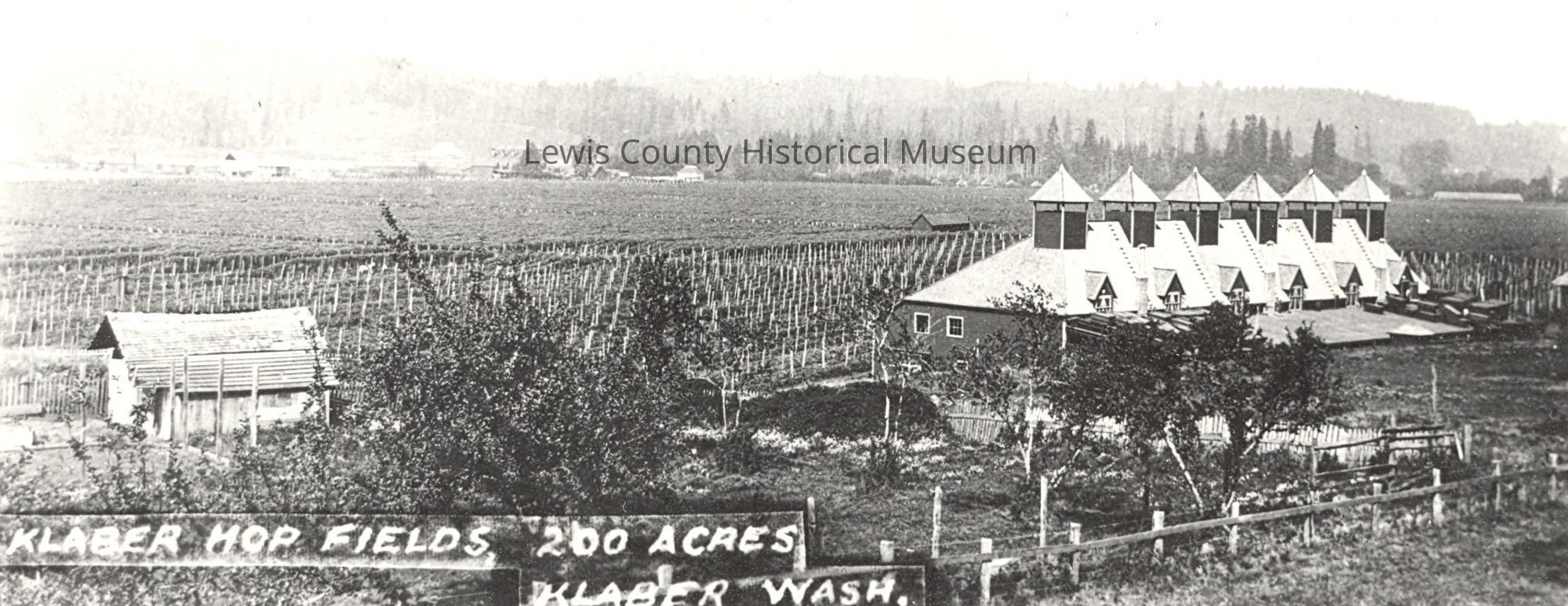
Klaber Hop Fields, circa 1900s

Also known as the Klaber Hops Farm or Klaber Hop Yards, the Klaber Hop Fields once existed in the town, overlapping with the communities of Boistfort and Curtis. Recorded between 200 acres (81 ha) and up to 360 acres (150 ha), (Note: The acreage of the Klaber Hop Fields varies widely in sources, from as low as 140 acres (57 ha) to as high as 400 acres (160 ha). Most reporting tends to mention the hop yards to encompass about 200 acres (81 ha); the 360 acres (150 ha) listings is usually in reference to the overall size of Herman Klaber's land purchase for the entire community. See sources throughout the article for the discrepancy.) both the farm and drying kilns were considered among the largest in the world between 1912 and 1920. The Klaber name was individually spelled out on the kiln's six chimneys and was noted to be viewed for "miles around". (Note: A total of 12 kilns existed at the kiln building, built in a manner that the facility could be accessed from both sides from the field.) The crop was known as "Klaber's Chehalis Hops".

At the community's peak, it was estimated to have a population of 2,000 during the hop-picking season; most residents worked at the hop fields. During the harvest, the town was considered a "miniature city". Herman Klaber ordered 400 homes built, which included wood floors, a wood-burning stove, and accessible water. The 144-square-foot (13.4 m^{2}) homes were lined in two rows. Workers, using tents, set up camps based on racial or cultural backgrounds; (Note: The camp area at the hop fields was known as "Tent Row".) laborers included indigenous workers, primarily people from the Upper Chehalis and Cowlitz tribes.

The opening of the local school season was often delayed until after the harvest. Stores in the valley and surrounding area accepted slips known as "hop tickets' in lieu of money. (Note: By 1975, a news article in The Daily Chronicle reported that older residents in Klaber Valley still used an expression, "Oh, I'll pay you in hop picking".) The $1 tickets were punched for every box a worker filled; the containers held 125 lb (57 kg) (or 25 US bushels (0.88 m^{3})). (Note: In order to achieve more "hop tickets", workers often chose to pick the crop in the early mornings. The weight was increased per box due to the collected dew on the hops. It took an average adult laborer approximately 3 hours to fill a box. Workers were paid an average wage of $3 per day, equivalent to $104 in 2025.) Before the 1910 harvesting season, Klaber created a temporary theater for "moving picture shows". The theater was meant to keep laborers in the community while providing entertainment to offset the workers from "becoming restless". The film industry publication, The Moving Picture World, stated that the "scheme meets with favor".

The dried hop cones were delivered to the "red depot" in Ceres where the crop was shipped on the Northern Pacific Railway line. On average, the hop farm yielded 1,500 bales, or between 300,000 pounds (140,000 kg) and 400,000 pounds (180,000 kg), annually. By 1910, approximately 900 acres (360 ha) in the Klaber Valley and the surrounding area were used to grow hops by various farmers.

Local pastors in Centralia and Chehalis demanded that members of their congregation not work at the Klaber farm due to hops being primarily used in the production of beer. In arguments against, laborers at the field, or those with a "thin conscience", stated the crop was also used to make yeast for bread and mostly ignored the demands, continuing to work at the hop yard.

=== Hop yard after Klaber's death ===
In 1912, a "downy, mildew fungus" began infecting the hop plants. After Klaber's death, financial losses and mismanagement, along with the spreading fungus, led to consistent struggles in hop production at the fields. Reports during the time and up until 1920, referred to the hop growing sector as a "growth industry"; however, business losses at Klaber occurred during the onset of World War I as shipments to Germany were disrupted.

Approximately 35 acres (14 ha) of the Klaber yards were plowed in 1917 to grow oats; reports began mentioning the fields as "at one time" the largest of its type in the United States. By 1923, the widespread hop fields in Lewis County had diminished in numbers. The reduced 135-acre (55 ha) Klaber yards, as well as a 35-acre (14 ha) field in Ceres owned by James "Jim" Chamberlain, were the only such farms remaining in the county.

Pests, such as aphids and a lice known as red spider, along with hot summers that burned the tips of the hop plant, were a long-running concern. Engineered pump systems, operated under horse and machine power, had been implemented by the early 1920s and were used to spray the crop to protect it from insects.

During the beginning of the Prohibition era, the fields began to wane. Large yields in the late 1920s, including over 800 bales in 1927, did not lead to sales. Despite rising prices for hops, the 1929 yield remained unsold and over 1,300 bales were in storage before the 1931 harvest season due to "unsatisfactory market conditions". The persistent concerns of lice and mold continued into the 1930s and despite rising prices for hops, the 1929 yield remained unsold. European markets still purchased from the company during the time but ongoing mismanagement of the company began taking a toll.

Near the end of the Klaber Hop Field's active production, the yards produced a low of 150 bales.

=== Closure ===
In 1936, the Klaber hop fields were noted to have been in a state described as, "grown up to weeds". The Chamberlain hop farm was extinct and a 25-acre (10 ha) plot known as the Garbe yard near Chehalis was the only significantly remaining active hop field in the county.

The decline at the Klaber yards worsened after a large blaze in July 1940 destroyed a barn, dairy, and a hop kiln; the loss was estimated to be $10,000, equivalent to $229,810 in 2025. Gertrude Klaber still owned portions of the community by that year. The Klaber Hop Fields closed in 1945, unable to overcome the persistent issues of mildew, coupled with an ongoing lack of leadership after Herman's death.

Most hop production in Washington state began shifting to Benton and Yakima counties due to better weather for the crop. There were no known producing hop fields in Lewis County by 1975. The non-native hopbush from the Klaber fields have spread throughout the region, most notably at the Discovery Trail outside of Centralia.

== Geography ==
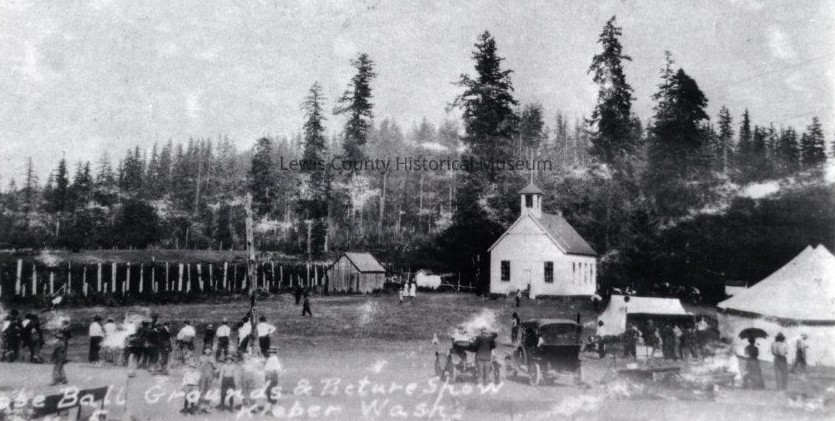
Schoolhouse, hop fields, and baseball field in Klaber, circa 1900

Klaber is located in Lewis County, Washington, immediately next to the community of Boistfort and south of Curtis. Situated in the Boistfort Valley, also known as Klaber Valley, the community rests on the South Fork Chehalis River. Klaber is considered by the Geographic Names Information System to be a populated, unincorporated place and has also been referred to as a ghost town.

The Klaber Hop Yard spanned from the historic Boistfort School up a small hill known as Boistfort Hill near Hubbard Road.

== Arts and culture ==
A historical sign marks the existence of the Klaber hop fields near the Boistfort Elementary School.

The archaeological Wolfenbarger Site, listed on the National Register of Historic Places (NRHP), is situated near Klaber. The Boistfort High School, also an NRHP location, is at the Klaber-Boistfort border. (Note: A few sources mention that the Klaber fields were placed on the National Register of Historic Places (NRHP) in 1977. As of 2026, no documentation exists to support the claim. The Wolfenbarger Site, which is located near the community of Klaber and added to the NRHP in that year, may be the point of the discrepancy.)

== Economy ==
Beginning in the 19th century, agriculture farming was the primary economic industry of the Boistfort Valley and the Klaber community. Major crops included barley, oats, timothy hay, and wheat. Hops were first grown in the 1880s. By the late 1950s, broccoli became a staple crop.

A sawmill known as the Klaber Lumber Company opened in the community on the Chehalis River in 1922. The mill had a daily capacity of 25,000 feet (7,620.0 m) and an early order for 150,000 feet (45,720.0 m) of lumber was to be used to construct a bridge across the river. The company had exclusive rights to 10 million feet (3,048,000.0 m) of timber.
