= Wildwood School (disambiguation) =

Wildwood School is a private K-12 school in west Los Angeles, California.

Wildwood School or Wildwood High School may also refer to:

- Wildwood School (Saskatoon), Canada
- Wildwood High School, a public high school in Cape May County, New Jersey
