= Timothy Bancroft House =

Historic house in New Hampshire, United States

- U.S. National Register of Historic Places
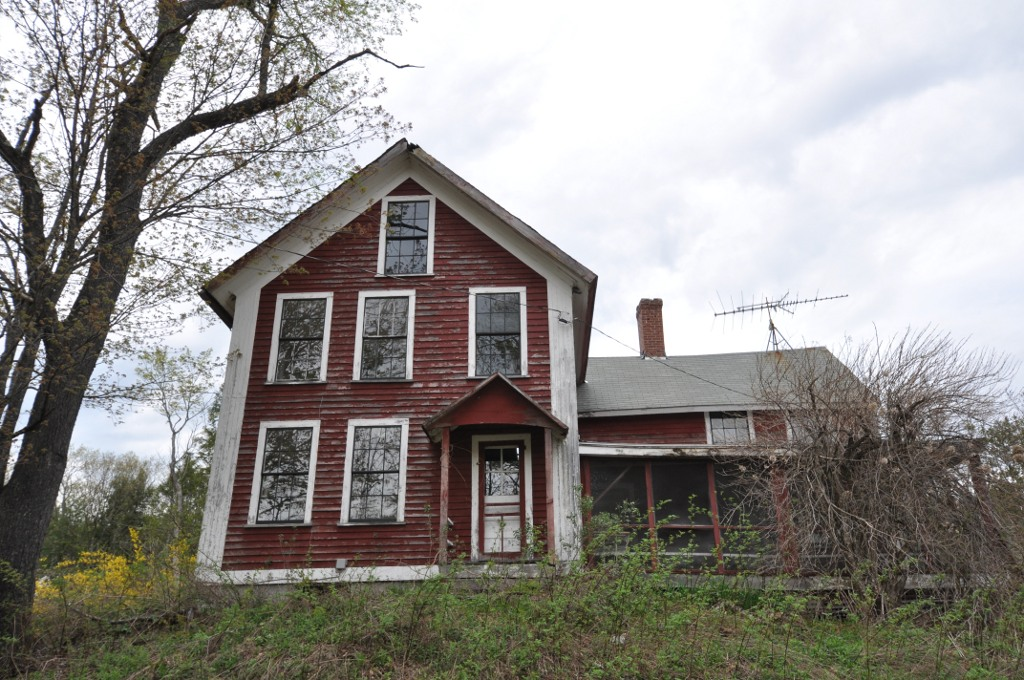

- Location within New Hampshire Location within the United States
- Location: Bancroft Rd., Harrisville, New Hampshire
- Coordinates: 42°57′54″N 72°5′57″W
- Area: 1.5 acres (0.61 ha)
- Built: 1785
- Architectural style: Greek Revival
- MPS: Harrisville MRA
- NRHP reference No.: 86003241
- Added to NRHP: January 14, 1988

The Timothy Bancroft House is a historic house on Bancroft Road in Harrisville, New Hampshire. Located in a rural area once known as Mosquitoville, this c. 1785 wood-frame house was built by Timothy Bancroft, who operated a sawmill nearby that was one of the town's major industries for nearly a century. The house was listed on the National Register of Historic Places in 1988.

== Description and history ==
The Timothy Bancroft House stands in what is now a rural and isolated area of northern Harrisville, near the end of Bancroft Road. Set on a rise overlooking the former mill site, it is a 2 1/2-story wood-frame structure, with a gabled roof and clapboarded exterior. An older ell extends to the east, with its own central chimney. The styling of the house is Greek Revival, with wide cornerboards and a gabled hood over the entrance. A shed-roof porch extends across the front of the ell.

Timothy Bancroft is believed to have built the ell of this house in about 1785; the larger main block was probably added in the mid-19th century. During the 19th century, the Bancroft mill complex was at the center of a community known variously as Mosquitoville and Mosquitobush. The complex included a number of additional buildings, and the busy mill supplied wood products to the textile mills in Harrisville center, and was a major local employer. The mill burned in 1875. The house was subsequently used as housing for another nearby sawmill, and then as a summer residence.

== See also ==
- Wildwood Cottage, another Mosquitoville remnant
- National Register of Historic Places listings in Cheshire County, New Hampshire
