= Herman Klaber =

American hops merchant (1870–1912); died on the Titanic

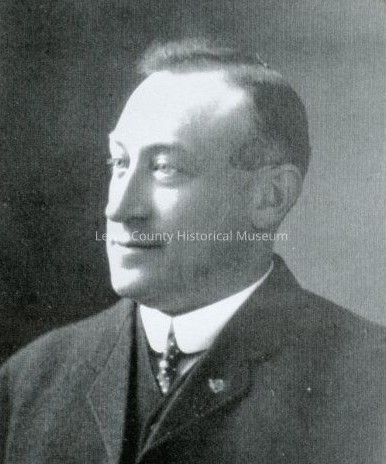
- Herman Klaber, circa 1905-1910
- Born: November 18, 1870; San Francisco, California
- Died: April 15, 1912 (aged 41); North Atlantic Ocean
- Other names: "Hop King of Lewis County" "Hop King" "King of Hops"
- Occupations: Businessman, merchant
- Years active: 1890s to 1912
- Spouse: Gertrude Ginsburg (m. 1907)
- Children: 1

Herman Klaber (November 18, 1870 – April 15, 1912) was an American businessman and hops merchant who once owned and operated the Klaber Hop Fields in Klaber, Washington, for a time considered the largest hops yard in the Pacific Northwest, and possibly in the United States.

Klaber was born in 1870 in San Francisco, California, and began his career in the hops industry by the early 1890s, creating his own merchant company that was considered the largest hops business in the United States. By 1903, he began purchasing hundreds of acres in the Boistfort Valley of Southwest Washington with the intent to construct a company town to support a large hops farm and drying kiln facility. The town, officially established in 1906, was originally given the name, "Klaberville".

Herman Klaber died during the sinking of the Titanic on April 15, 1912. After his death, the Klaber Hop Yard began suffering a slow decline from lower yields due to fungal infections and insects, subsequent financial losses, and ongoing mismanagement. The farm shuttered in 1945 and his town, Klaber, withered. A historical sign marks the former community and the Klaber Hop Fields.

== Early life ==
Klaber was born near San Francisco on November 18, 1870, to George and Bertha Klaber, Austrian and German immigrants, respectively. George became a citizen of the United States in 1848. Herman was of Jewish heritage and was reported to be 6 feet (1.8 m) tall, with brown hair and a "high forehead and straight nose".

== Hops merchant career ==
After completing his education, Klaber began his career in the hops industry as a clerk for William Uhlmann and Co., at the time one of the largest hop merchants in the United States. He often visited hop fields in Washington state during this time and gained recognition as a "genial hop buyer". By the early 1890s, he created his own merchant company, Klaber, Wolf & Netter, with offices located in Portland, San Francisco, and Tacoma; the company became the largest hop business in the United States. Klaber was also an owner of Seattle's Independent Brewing Company.

In 1893, Klaber moved to Tacoma, continuing his business pursuits in hops, while also selling insurance and owning a cigar store. He created the Herman Klaber Company, buying thousands of pounds of hops along the West Coast of the United States.

He married his wife, Gertrude Ginsburg, in February 1907; their daughter, Bernice Janet, was born in February 1910. Born in 1885, Gertrude was 15 years younger than Herman but was noted to be "undeterred" by the age difference. The couple lived primarily in Tacoma, along with Klaber's mother and two nieces, including Dorothy Danhauser. The Klabers moved to Portland by 1910.

Klaber, Wolf & Netter expanded into London in 1907 and in November 1908, Klaber testified before the House Ways and Means Committee to ask for higher tariffs on imported hops; the industry at the time was declared as "on its last legs".

=== Klaber Hop Fields ===
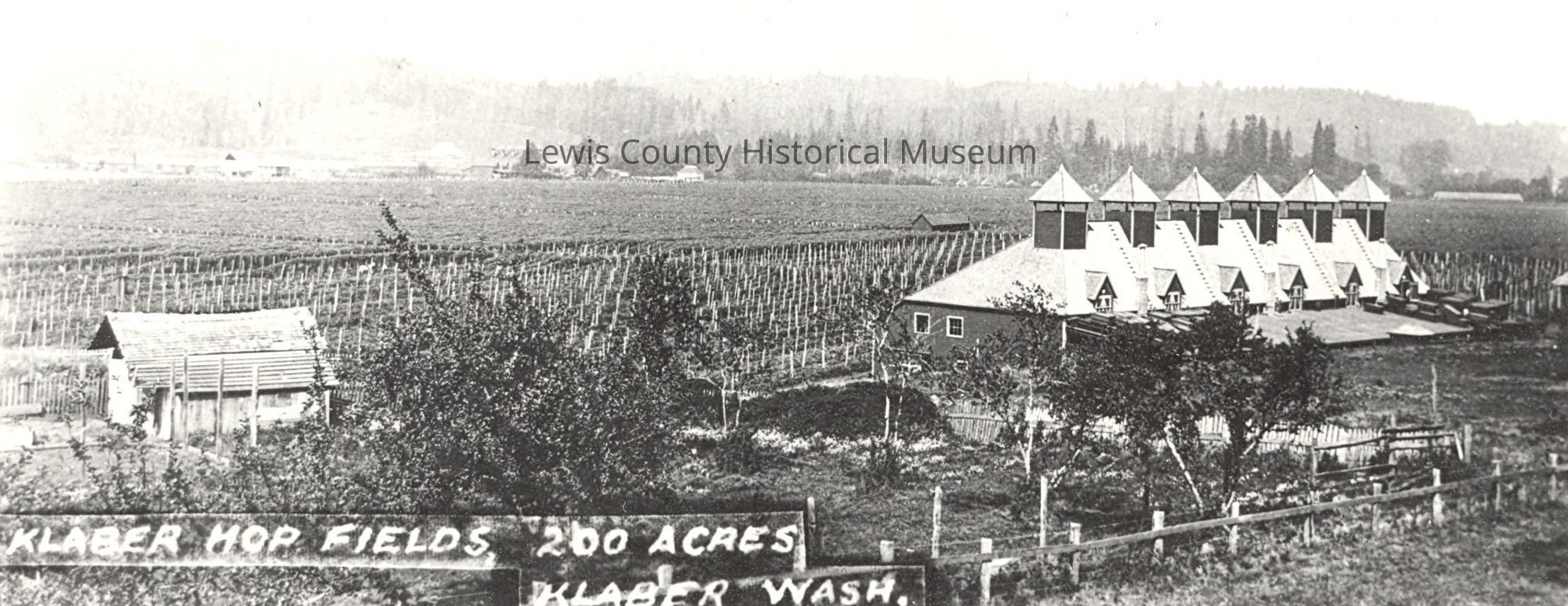
Klaber Hop Fields, circa 1900s

Herman Klaber founded the company town of Klaber, Washington, known as the "Hops Capital of the World", in 1906. Intending to grow hops, Klaber began buying up donation land claims in the valley surrounding the town. He obtained a total of 360 acres (150 ha) from several families. He submitted an application to create a post office named "Klaberville".

He immediately began constructing a barn, home, and four kilns. Further investing $75,000, equivalent to $2,687,500 in 2025, the hops merchant had 200 acres (81 ha) planted with hops. (Note: The acreage of the Klaber Hop Fields varies widely in sources, from as low as 140 acres (57 ha) to as high as 400 acres (160 ha). Most reporting tends to mention the hop yards to encompass about 200 acres (81 ha); the 360 acres (150 ha) listings is usually in reference to the overall size of Herman Klaber's land purchase for the entire community. See sources throughout the article for the discrepancy.) The Klaber Hop Fields, also known as the Klaber Hops Farm or Klaber Hop Yards, along with a 12-kiln facility, was considered the largest in the Pacific Northwest, and perhaps in the United States. The crop was known as "Klaber's Chehalis Hops".

Herman Klaber ordered 400 homes built with accessible water. Workers set up tent camps based on racial or cultural backgrounds; (Note: The camp area at the hop fields was known as "Tent Row".) laborers included indigenous workers, primarily people from the Upper Chehalis and Cowlitz tribes. In addition to his Klaber field, he also owned a hop farm approximately 1.5 miles (2.4 km) southwest of Chehalis.

Klaber became known under several monikers, including the "Hop King of Lewis County", "Hops King", or "King of Hops".

During the picking season, Herman lived in Klaber in a large, two-story bungalow that overlooked the hop field and community. (Note: Klaber referred to his hop field home as "the ranch".) He had five cottages built for his servants. His primary residence was located on a bluff in Tacoma that overlooked Commencement Bay. (Note: Klaber's house in Tacoma, a two-story American Craftsman built in 1905, was razed in the 1950s.) By 2001, his house in Klaber remained. Most of the original details were lost after it was remodeled to offset damage from prior renters; several artifacts have been found on the property.

After Klaber's death, financial losses and mismanagement, along with a spreading fungus and pest infections, led to consistent struggles in hop production at the fields. The Klaber Hop Fields closed in 1945, unable to overcome the persistent issues of mildew, coupled with an ongoing lack of leadership after Herman's death. The community "withered and died"; a historical sign located at the edge of the original hop field next to Boistfort Elementary School denotes the former company town.

== Death on the Titanic ==
Herman Klaber, alone, boarded the RMS Olympic in January 1912 to travel to Europe; he signed a will and testament before he departed. Klaber had been in Europe for business purposes to find a cure to combat mildew that permeated his Washingtion hop yields and to potentially sell the Klaber fields. After coming upon a Seattle businessman reading a copy of The Seattle Times, he booked passage on the RMS Titanic after becoming homesick for his wife, child, and Washington state; Klaber referred to the state as "God's country". (Note: Klaber, who occupied cabin C-142 under ticket No. 113028, was recorded to have purchased his Titanic passage at a cost of 26 pounds, 11 shillings, or $150, equivalent to $5,004 in 2025. He shared his cabin with Austen Partner, a London stockbroker.) A first-class passenger, he died during the sinking of the ocean liner on April 15, 1912; his remains were either not recovered or not identified. (Note: Whether or not Klaber's body was recovered, or unidentified, is disputed in reports. A death deposition was signed by a witness testifying that Klaber boarded a train that was reserved for Titanic passengers. See sources in the section for the discrepancy. During the recovery and retrieval of bodies, his cousin, David Netter, sent a telegram and letter, along with a photograph, detailing Herman's physical descriptions. Netter hoped that his correspondence would aid in identifying Klaber's body.)

In reports of the sinking and the prominent people who died, Klaber was considered among one of the most wealthy on the Titanic. His estate at the time of his death was reported to be $500,000, equivalent to $16,681,034 in 2025. Gertrude and Bernice received 60% of the estate. Some employees of his company, as well as workers at the Klaber Hop Fields, received up to $1,000. Two Beth Israel congregations in Portland and Tacoma also received $1,000; the money was meant to create stained glass windows in honor of his parents. His niece, Dorothy Danhauser, inherited $25,000, equivalent to $834,052 in 2025.

== Family ==
In February 1914, Dorothy Danhauser was murdered in San Francisco by her ex-fiancée, Abraham Pepper, who was distraught over Dorothy's marriage to another man a week prior. Using the inheritance as an excuse to meet, Pepper shot Danhauser in the back of the head. After Pepper shot at her body as she lay on the floor, he shot himself in the temple; immediate reports after the crime mentioned that he was still alive but unlikely to overcome his wound. Pepper "rallied" and survived after surgery; a charge of murder was submitted. The charge was changed to manslaughter and Pepper pled guilty. He was sentenced to eight years in San Quentin Prison. (Note: In news reports of Pepper's survival and guilty plea, the date of the murder is sometimes reported as occurring on April 24, 1914 despite evidence to the contrary. See sources about Danhauser's murder for the discrepancy.)

Twenty-six year old Gertrude sold their Klaber home, and any personal property that remained. She planned to never return to the hop field company town, moving to Sacramento after Herman's death. Gertrude Klaber, who never remarried, died on March 17, 1961. Their daughter, Bernice, married but had no children and died a year after her mother in February 1962.
