= Curtis, Washington =

Unincorporated community in Washington, United States

- Unincorporated community
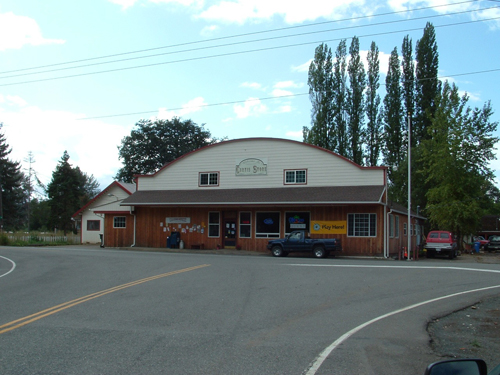
- The Curtis Store

- Location within Washington (state) Location within the United States
- Coordinates: 46°35′13″N 123°06′36″W
- Country: United States
- State: Washington
- County: Lewis
- Elevation: 230 ft (70 m)
- Time zone: UTC-8 (Pacific (PST))
  - Summer (DST): UTC-7 (PDT)
- ZIP Code: 98538
- Area code(s): 360, 564
- GNIS feature ID: 1510904

Curtis is an unincorporated community in the U.S. state of Washington. It is located less than 3 miles north of Boistfort, and is south of Washington State Route 6. The South Fork Chehalis River flows through the town.

== History ==
A post office has been in operation since 1901 inside the Curtis General Store. Benjamin L. Curtis, the first postmaster of the area, built the store and gave the community his name.

At its founding, the town's economy was based on logging and farming, particularly hops. The Klaber Hop Fields (Farm) once existed in Curtis, overlapping with the communities of Boistfort and Klaber. Recorded at 360 acres (150 ha), it was the largest hops field in the world for a time.

Curtis suffered severe flooding during the Great Coastal Gale of 2007, including the loss of operations at the post office where mud, measured to be up to 8 feet (2.4 m) deep, inundated the Curtis Store. The post office was temporarily moved to Boistfort Elementary School.

== Arts and culture ==
=== Historic buildings and sites ===
Curtis is home to two listings on the National Register of Historic Places, the Boistfort High School and the Wolfenbarger Site. A railroad covered bridge existed in Curtis but was removed in 1975 in favor of a steel girder crossing.

The Boistfort Valley Farm, also known as the Lewis County Barn, was constructed approximately in 1913 by the Beall family and is listed on the Washington State Heritage Barn Register (WSHBR). The 34 ft × 46 ft (10 m × 14 m) structure was originally used to raise rabbits to provide fur for clothing; it was later converted to a dairy barn. A grant from WSHBR helped to repair the foundation and roof of the barn, which was completed in 2009.

== Education ==
The community once had a two-room schoolhouse. Curtis students are now served by the Boistfort School District and the Boistfort Consolidated School.

== Government and politics ==
Presidential Elections Results
Year	Republican	Democratic	Third parties
2008	67.5% 139	30.6% 63	1.9% 4
2012	73.1% 136	25.8% 48	1.1% 2
2016	66.7% 138	23.7% 49	9.7% 20
2020	72.9% 180	26.3% 65	0.8% 2
2024	69.8% 206	28.5% 84	1.7% 5

=== Politics ===
As Curtis is an unincorporated community, there are no defined bounds, and the precinct may be incongruous with the census boundaries.

The 2020 election included two votes for candidates of the Libertarian Party and two votes for write-in candidates. In the 2024 election, there were 2 votes cast for write-in candidates and 3 votes were tallied for Robert F. Kennedy Jr..

== Notable people ==
- Warren A. Taylor, first Speaker of the Alaska House of Representatives
