= Wildwood, Washington =

Unincorporated community in Washington, United States

- Unincorporated community
- Location within Washington (state) Location within the United States
- Coordinates: 46°27′34″N 123°05′24″W
- Country: United States
- State: Washington
- County: Lewis
- Established: 1889
- Elevation: 354 ft (108 m)
- Time zone: UTC-8 (Pacific (PST))
  - Summer (DST): UTC-7 (PDT)
- ZIP Code: 98596
- Area code(s): 360, 564

Wildwood is an unincorporated community in Lewis County, in the U.S. state of Washington. The town is located between Boistfort and Vader. The community's early days, similar to other areas in Lewis County, had an economy driven by lumber production however it has retained its predominant agricultural roots. The area is known for its elk hunting.

== History ==
Wildwood was first settled by non-Native people in 1881. A post office called Wildwood was established on August 24, 1889 by Thomas G. Naylor and remained in operation until 1930. The moniker was chosen as it was descriptive of the original condition of the town site.

== Education ==
The first school in Wildwood opened in 1884, built by volunteers using lumber donated by the neighboring town of Boistfort. The school remained until a district division in 1895. A small school existed for a brief time in the 1910s and 1920s.
