= Boistfort High School =

Historic landmark in Boistfort, Washington

- U.S. National Register of Historic Places
- Washington State Heritage Register
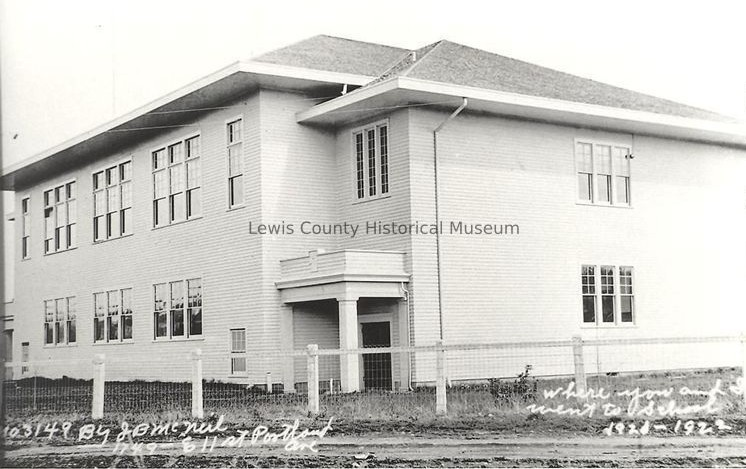
- Boistfort High School, ca. 1921–1922

- Location within Washington (state)
- Location: 983 Boistfort Road, Curtis, Washington
- Coordinates: 46°32′59″N 123°07′55″W
- Area: less than one acre
- Built: 1918
- Built by: C.A. Haynes
- Architect: C.E. Troutman
- MPS: Rural Public Schools in Washington from early Settlement to 1945 MPS
- NRHP reference No.: 87001335

Significant dates
- Added to NRHP: August 7, 1987
- Designated WSHR: April 29, 1987

Boistfort High School is an historic schoolhouse located in Boistfort, Washington. The school was listed on the National Register of Historic Places in 1987.

The Boistfort community began its educational pursuits by 1854, creating the first school and district in what was then known as the Washington Territory. The initial schoolhouse was the residence of a homesteader family. Due to the spread of settler population in the territory at the time, along with Boistfort's commitment to education, the town was the first proposed location of the University of Washington.

A standard schoolhouse was built by 1874, replaced by a high school and campus in 1912. The facilities could not keep up with the growing rise of students in the Boistfort-Curtis-Klaber region, known as the Boistfort Valley, mostly due to several district consolidations. As a result, the historic Boistfort High School was constructed and completed in 1918. Due to the effects of the Great Influenza, the school was only temporarily opened later that year with a formal dedication and opening not held until April 1919. The facility, when built, was one of only two schools in the county meant exclusively for high school students.

Boistfort High School, at the time of its NRHP designation, was considered to be in a mostly unaltered state. The building was home to a first-floor centralized gym and the schoolhouse contained original flooring, woodwork, and classroom layouts, including an assembly hall. It held six classrooms and when constructed, was noted for its modern educational amenities.

The facilities became a central hub for the community and the grounds grew to become a campus. A detached gymnasium was built in the mid-1920s and the Boistfort Elementary School was erected in 1936 after another consolidation. Since its beginnings, the high school provided classes geared for college, or for students less inclined to attend a university and move from the region, a focus on agriculture and homemaking. Enrollment was considered high for the area but the student population was often recorded between 40 and 60 pupils.

Financial difficulties, and calls for the Boistfort school district to consolidate with larger communities, began to materialize in the early 1970s. Failures to raise tax funds and increasing maintenance costs led to the end of the school's use as an education center. Boistfort High School closed before the start of the 1977–1978 school year.

Boistfort High School has been recognized as a symbol of the community's pride, noted for its connection to the town's history of focus towards public education.

== Early history of education in Boistfort ==
The first school in Boistfort began in 1853 or 1854, (Note: Although most reports refer to 1854 as the year the first Boistfort school opened, a number of sources mention 1853. See sources throughout the article for the discrepancy.) the first such school and district in Washington Territory. The school, with 5 pupils, was held at the home and tutelage of Mary Buchanan Newland. An official schoolhouse built of cedar planks, "near the old grove on the Stillman place", was begun in 1854 and completed in 1855; first classes were held during that spring or summer under J.W. Anderson, a local lawyer. Newland's husband, Thomas, became the county's superintendent between 1854 and 1856.

As the Boistfort Valley was more populous than the Puget Sound region at the time, the community was chosen by territory legislation as a site in 1855 or 1856 for the University of Washington. (Note: An 1855 report by the Olympia Pioneer and Democrat mentioned that Boistfort was to be the location of a branch of the University of Washington, not the main campus.) No buildings were constructed and following legislation in 1859 scrapped the idea opting for a 10-acre (4.0 ha) parcel in the middle of Seattle. (Note: The University of Washington's move out of Boistfort to Seattle is reported at times to be waylaid by a temporary proposal to place the college at Cowlitz Prairie in approximately 1860.) The loss of the state college was suspected to be partially due to ongoing conflicts in the region between Native Americans and settlers during the time.

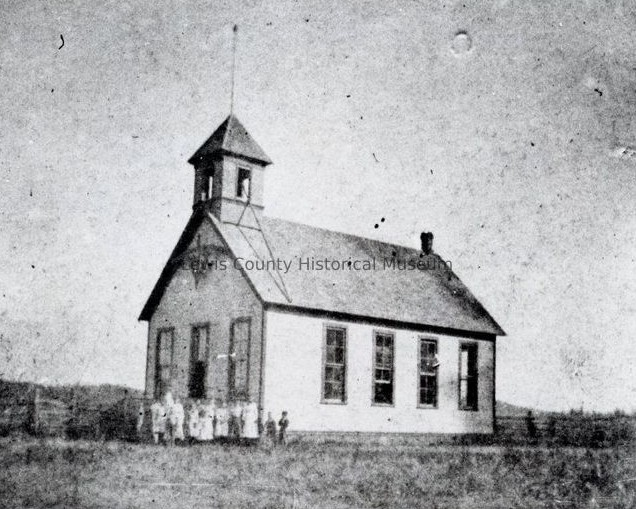
Baw Faw School, 1895

A permanent schoolhouse was built in 1874, and was considered more centrally located in the valley; Boistfort was classified as District No. 1. The building and grounds were sold to the community's Baw Faw Grange for $400 in 1912 when a new schoolhouse was built. A bell from the 1874, which had been kept by a local family for over 60 years after the organization could find no immediate use for it, was put on display by the local Lions Club outside of the grange building in January 2018.

A large consolidation of eight education systems in 1910 led to the formation of school district No. 204, known either as the Klaber or Boistfort school district. During this time, eighth graders and high school students were taught at the Boistfort Church but a new school facility was built across the Chehalis River from the 1855 school in 1912. The high school, one of three educational buildings constructed on a campus between Boistfort and Klaber, (Note: The NRHP form reports the 1912 school facility as a single, three-room schoolhouse.) cost $4,000 and was dedicated in September 1912. Within just a few years, the growing high school student population made the situation untenable.

== Boistfort High School ==
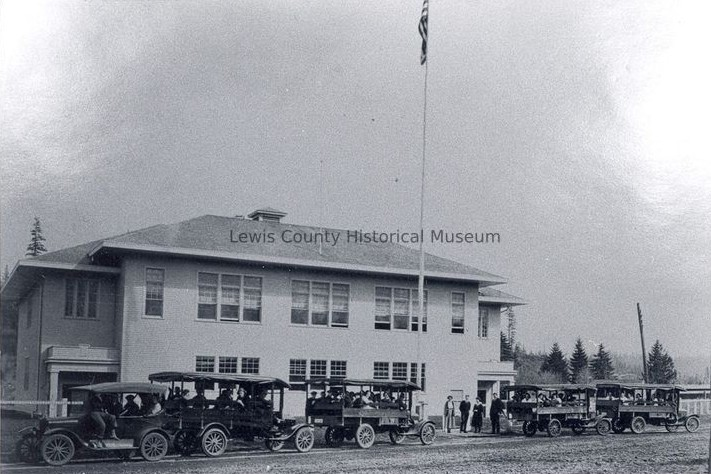
Boistfort High School, 1920

Boistfort High School was constructed during the summer and autumn of 1918 and was the first such school to be exclusively for use as a high school in the Boistfort Valley. The school's opening was delayed by the effects of the Great Influenza epidemic but was temporarily of use by December 1918 when the county authorized districts to reopen as they saw fit. The school opened fully for students in 1919, with a dedication ceremony held on April 4, 1919. The event lasted from mid-morning until late into the evening. Various local and regional people who were in several education and agriculture fields spoke and the evening keynote speaker was Edmond S. Meany, a noted professor from the University of Washington. Meany's speech highlighted Boistfort's early education history and the community's connection to the university.

At the time, Boistfort High School was one of just two high schools in Lewis County. Due to the rural nature of the valley, various methods to transport students were undertaken, including an early form of school bus. By 1925, the building was being used for both elementary and high school students from eight consolidated districts and official school buses were used. At the time, it was also known as the Boistfort Community School. The community voted for a larger gymnasium and the district's property was valued at $1.5 million.

A detached, 5,400-square-foot (500 m^{2}) gymnasium was constructed behind the school beginning in May 1924. The $7,600 facility included a 40 ft × 70 ft (12 m × 21 m) basketball court and a raised stage. The building, of colonial-style architecture, was designed by Chehalis architect, Jacque "Jack" DeForest Griffin, noted for his work in the Chehalis Downtown Historic District and his design of the Lewis County Courthouse. The district purchased four school buses in 1929 after selling the 1912 schoolhouse.

Another consolidation in 1933 created a larger school district known as No. 234. The school facility continued to serve the region both educationally and as a meeting place for various clubs and organizations for decades. The valley's younger students were served by a new Boistfort Elementary School, constructed in 1936. The elementary grounds received various new pieces of playground equipment during an upgrade in 1957. A newer, detached gymnasium was built on the high school grounds in the 1960s.

The campus' two baseball fields were renovated and upgraded during a volunteer project spanning from 2000 to 2002. The efforts on the fields, which are used for other sports and opened to members of the community, were overseen by the Boistfort Lion's Club with grants and donations totaling almost $100,000.

=== Closure ===
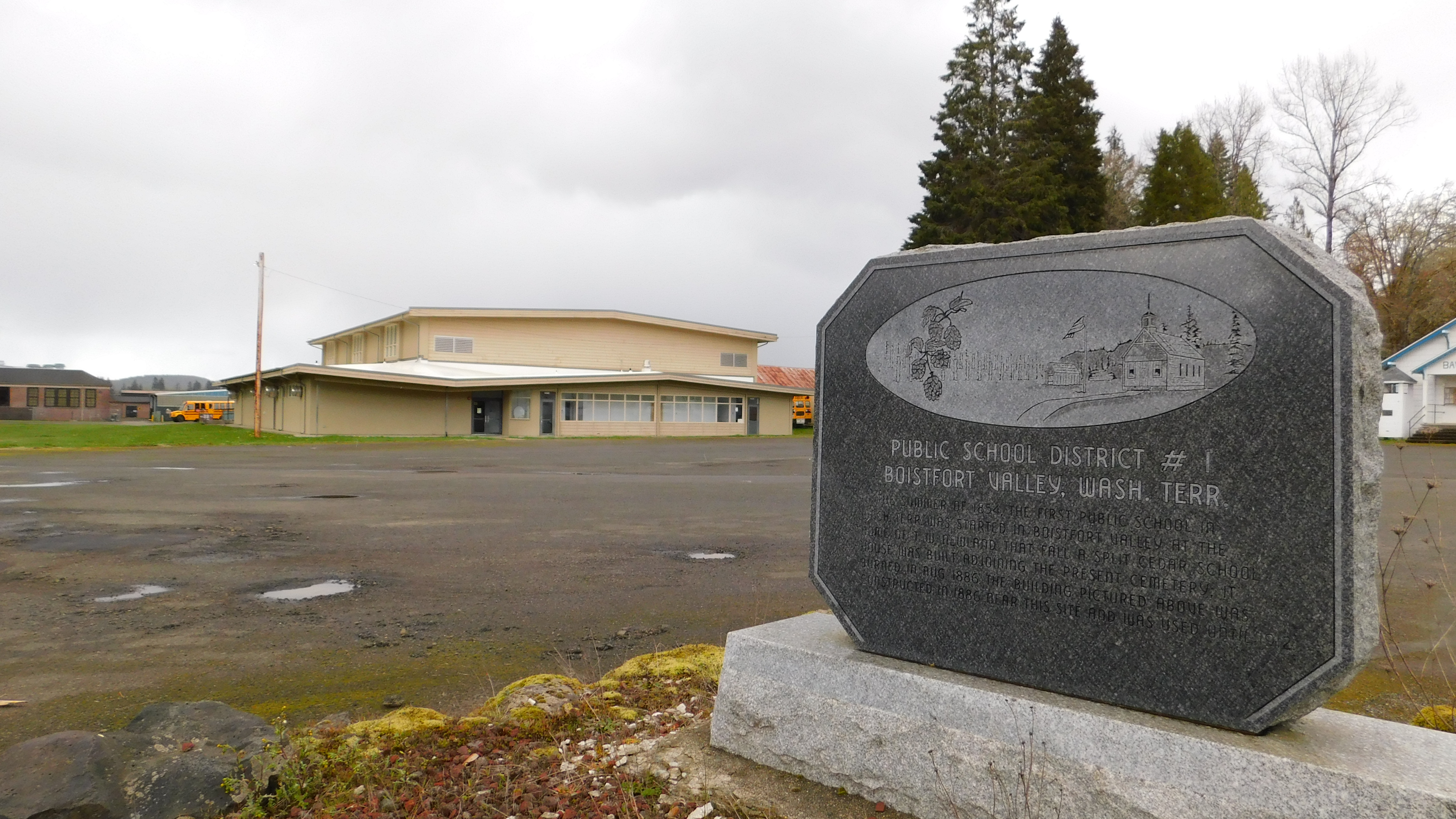
School and historical marker, 2025

Tax funds to maintain and operate the school became an issue by the early 1970s, with two special one-year levies introduced in 1971. At a combined $58,000, the monies were required for basic maintenance costs and the purchase of a new bus. In anticipation of a proposed Weyerhaeuser manufacturing plant in the Boistfort-Curtis-Klaber region which was expected to increase the student population, the district purchased a 16-acre (6.5 ha) parcel in late-1973 that was adjacent to the existing Boistfort campus. The plot was purchased from George Wolfenbarger for $16,002. The timber facilities did not materialize.

By 1974, with approval from both the district and state education boards, early attempts were made to consolidate the district with Adna despite local opposition and concerns over costs. High schoolers were to be transferred to a new proposed school in Curtis. A $60,000 levy was passed that year but the funding was for a single school year. The district attempted two levies in 1975 for a combined total of $172,000 which would have covered costs for maintenance and operations, the purchasing of educational materials and supplies, a limited hiring of staff, and raises for teachers and administrators. Money was also planned to be used to cover expenses for sports and school clubs as well as hot lunches, which had been removed from the basic budget. Funding failures and lack of proper contracts in the school's athletic department nearly led to a student strike at the beginning of the 1975 school year.

The continuing financial demands, coupled with ongoing dissatisfaction between school staff and district administrators, two levy votes failed in 1977, including a final effort in May, to raise over $144,000. The votes failed to achieve a 60% minimum threshold to pass.

Boistfort High School officially closed before the beginning of the 1977–1978 school year. With a contract between the Boistfort and Chehalis school districts, a majority of students elected to attend high school in Chehalis. A smaller number chose to study in Adna with one student opting for the high school in Pe Ell. The school yard at the high school was vandalized in October 1977.

An attempt to reopen Boistfort High School was offered by the school district via another levy, reduced to under $32,000; the proposition failed the following February. Artifacts from the Wolfenbarger Site, a nearby NRHP-listed archaeological site, were proposed to be stored in a museum setting at the high school as a means to keep the school open.

In 2004, the school district considered demolishing Boistfort High School over concerns of asbestos and the building remaining vacant since its closure.

== Geography ==
Boistfort High School is located on Boistfort Road in Boistfort, Washington on the community's border with Klaber. (Note: The school's location is often reported or listed as varying between Boistfort, Curtis, or Klaber. See sources throughout the article for the discrepancy.) The NRHP form lists the schoolhouse's location to be in the community of Curtis and centrally located in the Boistfort Valley, surrounded by farm land. The Chehalis River is situated approximately 100 yards (91.4 m) south of the schoolhouse.

The high school is part of an overall campus that includes the Boistfort Elementary School.

== Architecture and features ==
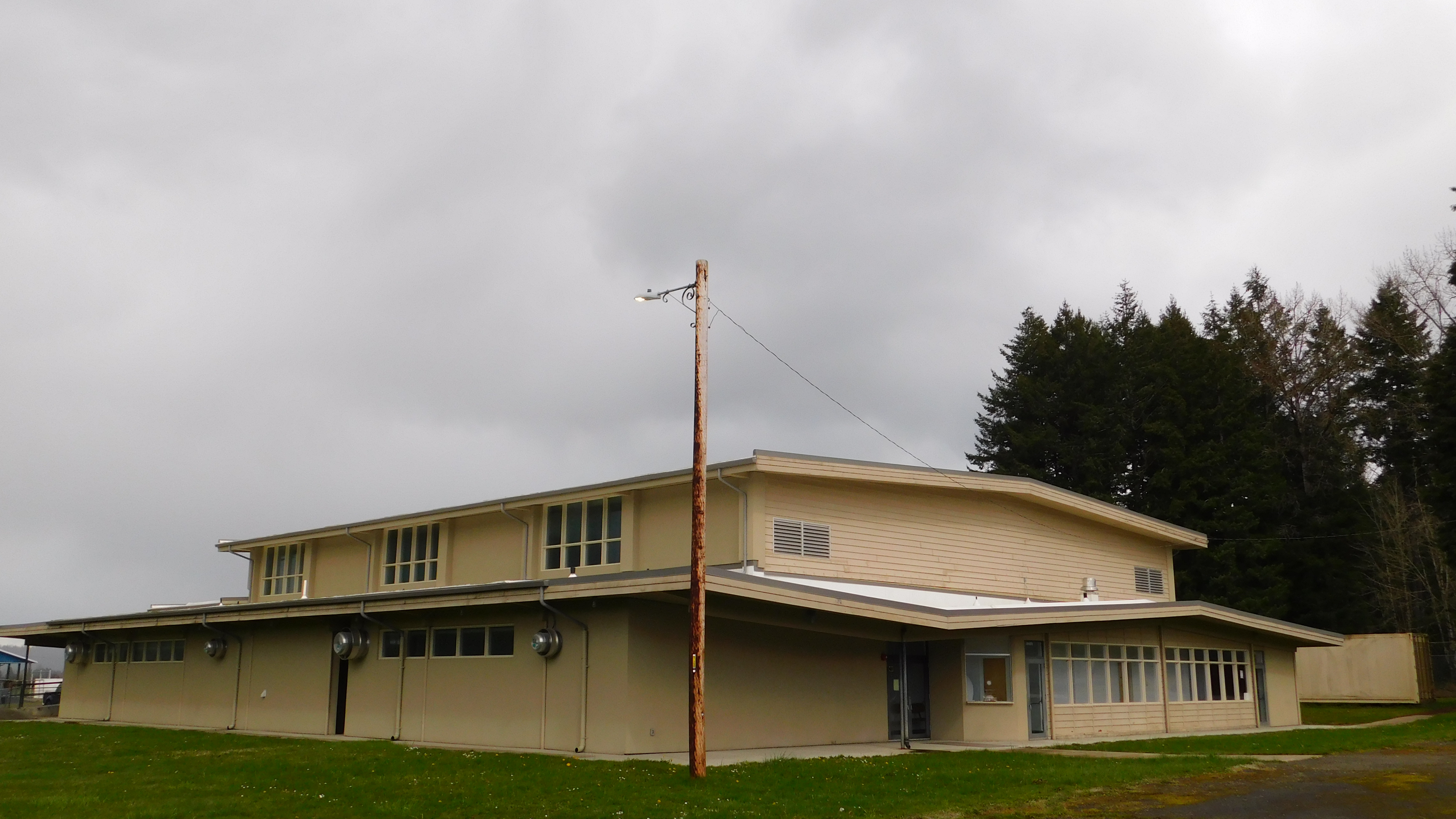
Boistfort High School, 2025

Unless otherwise noted, the details provided are based on the 1987 National Register of Historic Places (NRHP) nomination form and may not reflect updates or changes to Boistfort High School in the interim.

Boistfort High School is a two-story frame building on a concrete foundation with a rectangular footprint. The front lawn is considered part of the NRHP listing.

=== Exterior ===
The building features a hip roof with a flat top, and contains broad, expanding eaves. A brick chimney, rising above the roof, is located at the rear of the building. Cedar clapboard, 6 inches (15 cm) wide, cover the exterior walls which contain various groupings of multiple-over-one sash windows. On the front face, windows on the second floor contain six-panel transoms.

Three entrances are located on the schoolhouse, including a double-door, central rear entry that projects from the façade. Access via the front of the school is located at the corners of the building with two recessed entryways. Porticoes originally covered the corner access points but had been removed at some point before the NRHP nomination. The entrances were boarded up and the double-doors moved to the side walls in the 1960s, constructed with covered ramps to allow access for handicapped students.

Flood lights, as a protection against increasing vandalism, were installed in 1971.

=== Interior ===
Wide hallways, running parallel to the front and rear walls of the school, determines the layout of the building. The first floor contains a dominate, centrally located gymnasium with original wood floors, wainscotting, and spectator balconies at the opposite ends of the indoor recreation area. Additional space on the ground floor is taken up by classrooms, in which original wooden chair rails and picture rails, as well as chalkboards, remain.

The second floor is host to additional classrooms, with a large home economics room, as well as a library and assembly hall on the west end of the school building. A raised stage, with side alcoves, are features in the auditorium. A "manual training department" classroom was open at the time the school was dedicated. Throughout the interior, the schoolhouse retains original fir flooring, door and window millwork, and paneled doors.

At the time of Boistfort High School's construction, amenities such as the indoor gym along with its balconies and locker room, the assembly room, and classroom facilities were considered progressive and up-to-date. The school was listed to contain 10 rooms, six of them as classrooms. By 1923, the district spent $1,800, equivalent to $34,014 in 2025, on framed photographs that lined the main, first-floor hallway or were placed in classrooms; the pictures were considered a "feature of the district".

=== Renovations and alterations ===
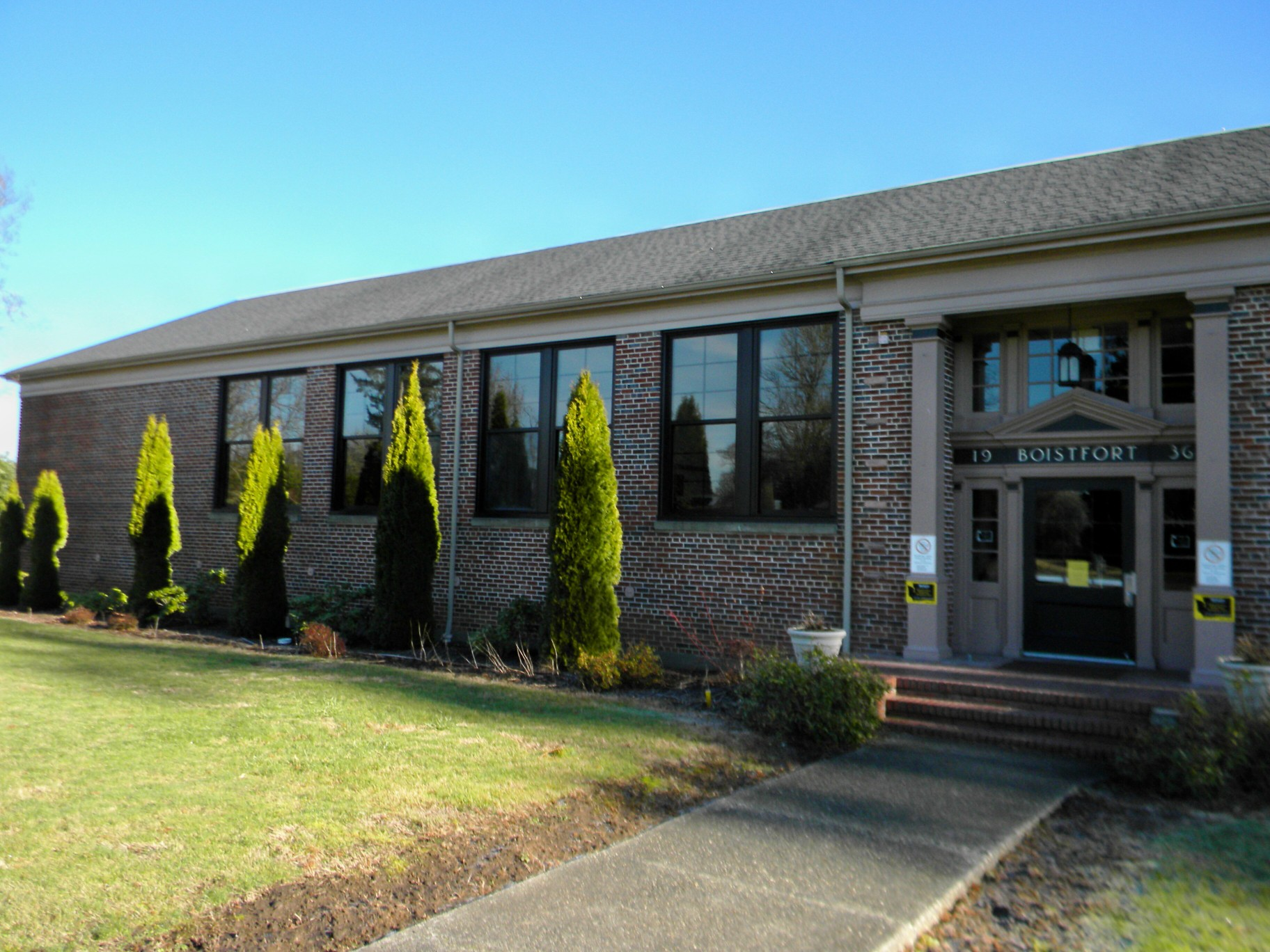
Boistfort Elementary School, 2015

With the exceptions to the relocation of the corner portico entrances to the building's side walls and the build of a separate gymnasium, the schoolhouse was considered to be in an almost unaltered state.

=== Non-contributing properties ===
A gymnasium located behind the school, constructed in the 1960s, and the nearby Boistfort Elementary School, built in the 1930s, are not included in the NRHP listing. The gym, though part of the high school campus, is a detached structure.

== Education ==
By the 1920s, courses were geared for either advancement into college or focused on regional needs, particularly agriculture and farming. Examples include classes on dairy production and soil studies, as well as homemaking and "domestic engineering". Farming students maintained a garden plot and homemaking pupils learned "household chemistry". Students were also able to take a manual training class which taught hand tool usage and care, with a focus on tools used in farming or other agricultural pursuits. The training class also taught woodworking. A class on radio and wireless technology was introduced for the autumn 1923 school year; antennas had been built on the grounds by students the prior semester. Shorthand and typing classes were introduced in 1928.

In 1957, classes were expanded to include a boys home economics course and a wood-and-metal shop class for girls. A revised code of conduct for the student body was completed in 1970. Girls were allowed to wear pants throughout the school year but not blue jeans and all students were required to "use good judgement in their appearance".

Students held an annual event known as the May Day Festival where a coronation of a king and queen from the student body was a highlight of the affairs.

=== Sports ===
The boys basketball team won the overall county championship with an undefeated season in 1922, with another title in 1925. The team won the county Class B title in 1935. That same year, the baseball team achieved a county title, going undefeated in their division. The team was recognized with an award known as the Wilson Athletic Company trophy.

With a listed enrollment of just 35 students, the Boistfort's boys basketball team earned a berth for the first time to the state's Class B tournament in 1968.

== Enrollment ==
Before the construction of Boistfort High School, the previous high school facility recorded an attendance of 23 students in 1916; the count was the largest in Boistfort's history.

By 1922, enrollment for high school students was listed at 51, with reports in 1925 listing between 50 and 60 pupils. As the facilities temporarily taught elementary classes before the 1930s elementary school was built, a total of 250 pupils were enrolled at the school. A slight drop to 48 students was recorded for the 1928 year.

The student population continued to fluctuate into the mid-20th century, with a high of 61 pupils in 1957 and a drop to 35 students by 1968. A tally in 1975 recorded 61 students at Boistfort High School.

== Significance ==
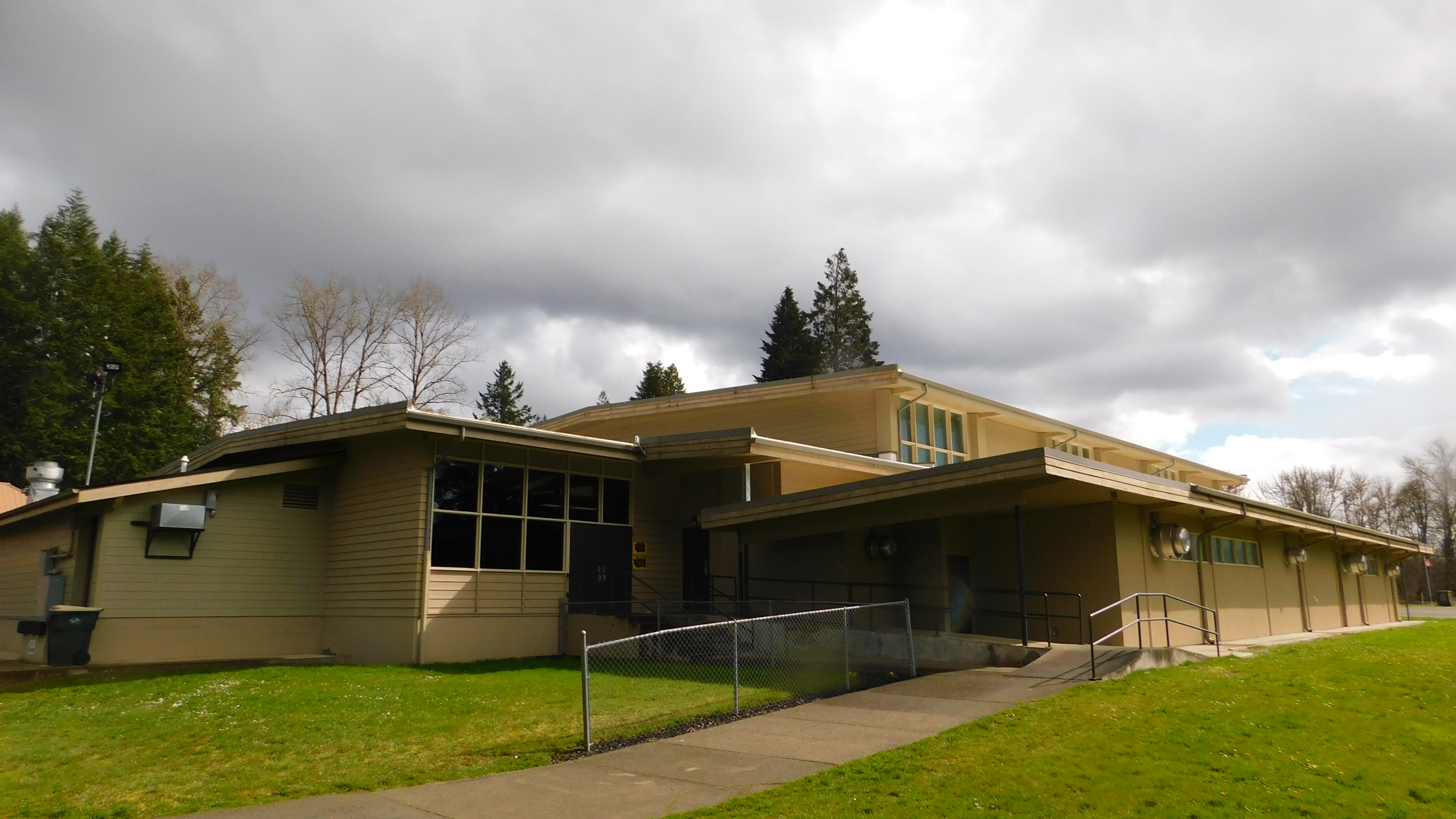
Alternate view, 2025

Boistfort High School was added to the National Register of Historic Places on August 6, 1987. Contributing factors to the listing was Boistfort's connection to the "growth of public education" in the rural valley with the schoolhouse noted for being the first such school specifically meant for high school students in the region. The school was recognized for the increase in local student attendance and subsequently, as an "evolution of the educational system in the early 20th century". The school building was recognized for its "excellent integrity of form, fabric, and association" as well as being the leading school facility in the Boistfort Valley.

At the dedication ceremony, the school was considered to be of long-lasting importance to the community and was declared as a symbol of the pride and value that Boistfort directed towards the education of its youth. A plaque to commemorate the 1854 Newland school site was arranged between the town and the Washington State Historical Society in 1922. The marker was to be affixed to an oak tree that had grown at the location of the schoolhouse. The community's historic education tradition stemming from the 1850s allows the town to be associated with the 1987 NRHP Multiple Property Documentation Form, "Rural Public Schools in Washington from Early Settlement to 1945".

Prior to the national designation, the school was listed with the Washington State Heritage Register on August 7, 1987.

== Notable alumni ==
- Scott Crossfield, test pilot
