= Boistfort, Washington =

- Unincorporated community
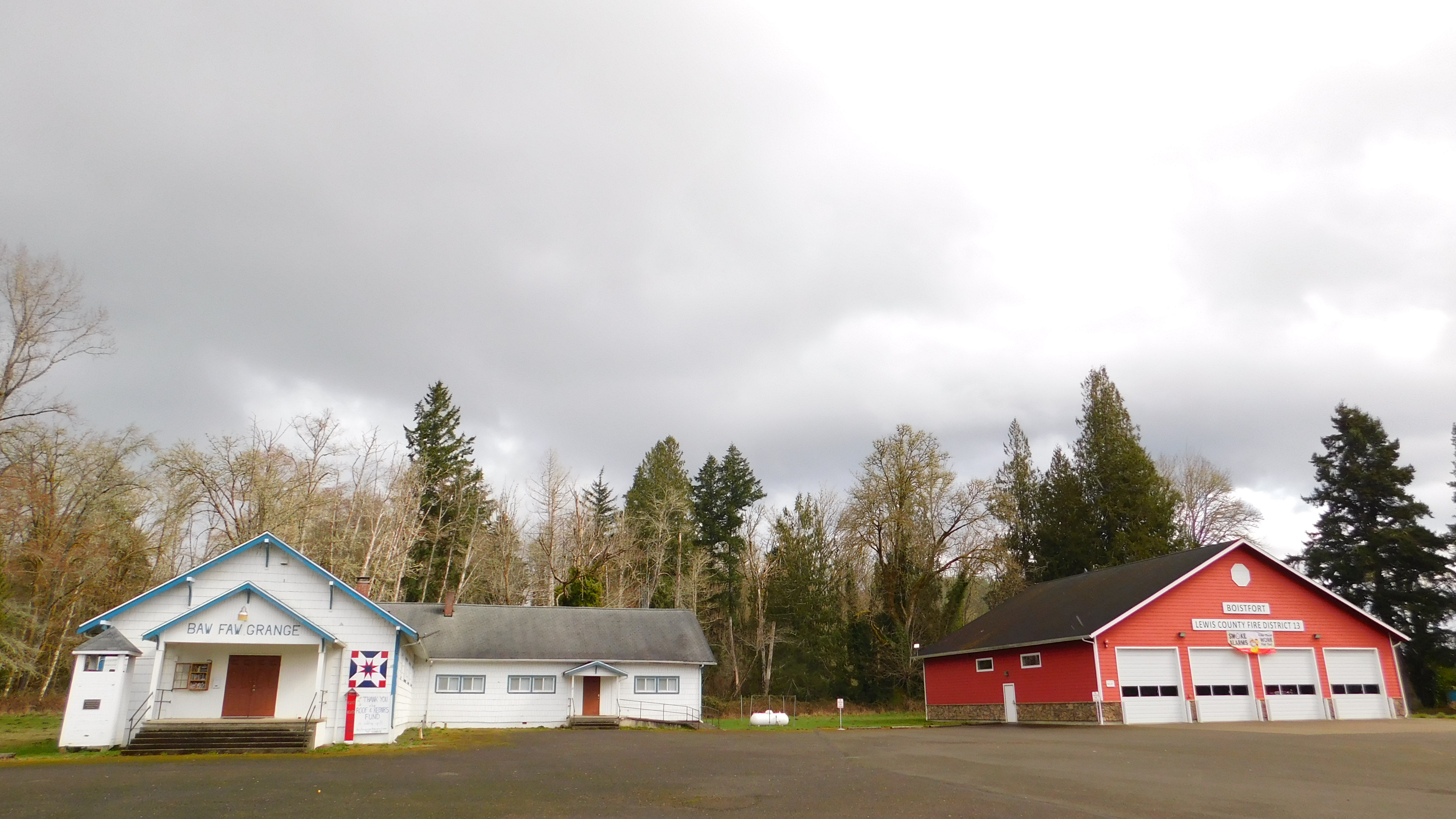
- Boistfort grange hall and fire department, 2025

- Location within Washington (state) Location within the United States
- Coordinates: 46°32′06″N 123°08′01″W
- Country: United States
- State: Washington
- County: Lewis
- Established: 1857
- Elevation: 285 ft (87 m)

Population (2019)
  - Total: around 300
- Time zone: UTC-8 (Pacific (PST))
  - Summer (DST): UTC-7 (PDT)
- ZIP Code: 98532
- Area code(s): 360, 564
- GNIS feature ID: 1510831

Boistfort (/ˈbɔɪstfɔːrt/) is an unincorporated community in the northwest United States, in Lewis County, Washington, about twenty miles (30 km) southwest of Chehalis.

Boistfort established, in 1853, the first public school and school district in Lewis County and the Territory of Washington. The community was originally chosen for the site of the University of Washington.

== Etymology ==
The Boistfort valley grasslands were originally known under the name, Talaln, by the indigenous Cowlitz people and became known as Baw Faw Prairie by pioneer settlers. The community intentionally adopted the French name Boisfort, which was pronounced as "Baw Faw", and was fitting for the area as the word has been translated as "heart of the forest", "strong wood or heavy forest" or "small valley surrounded by green hills". The spelling was officially changed to Boistfort. The Boistfort name has no connection to the pioneer Borst family or Fort Borst.

== History ==
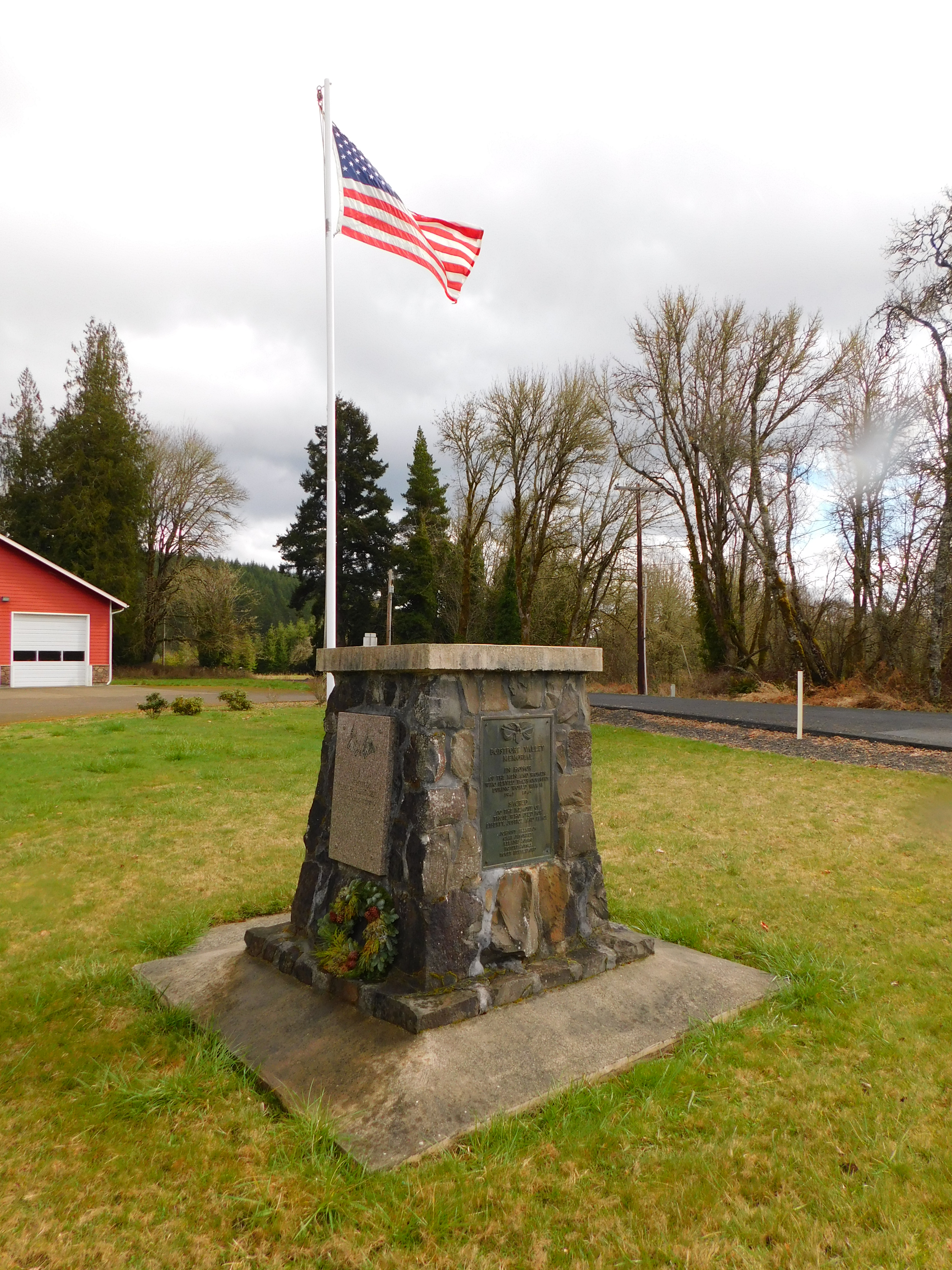
Memorial at Boistfort, 2025

The first non-indigenous settlers to the Boistfort prairie was the family of Charles and Elizabeth White who migrated from Peoria, Illinois beginning in April 1851. Traveling northwards from Portland, Oregon, the Whites came upon the valley in the spring of 1852, staking a land claim. Relatives of the family followed that year and into 1853, growing the community further during the time with other settlers staking additional claims, creating farm land and building homes. The people of Boistfort built a road into Claquato in 1854, opening up the new town to regional commerce.

A post office in the area was established in 1857. In 1900 Boistfort had a store, a barber, church, a blacksmith shop, and a meeting hall. Boistfort High School was built in 1918 and officially closed in 1978.

Boistfort was home to hop fields owned by Herman Klaber, who had a small mansion now known as the Boistfort Mansion. He died on the Titanic in 1912 and his hop yards shut down soon afterwards.

Notable test pilot Scott Crossfield (1921–2006) moved to the area in his teens and graduated from Boistfort High School in 1939. He was the first to travel at twice the speed of sound (1953), and piloted the first flights of the North American X-15 (1959).

== Geography ==
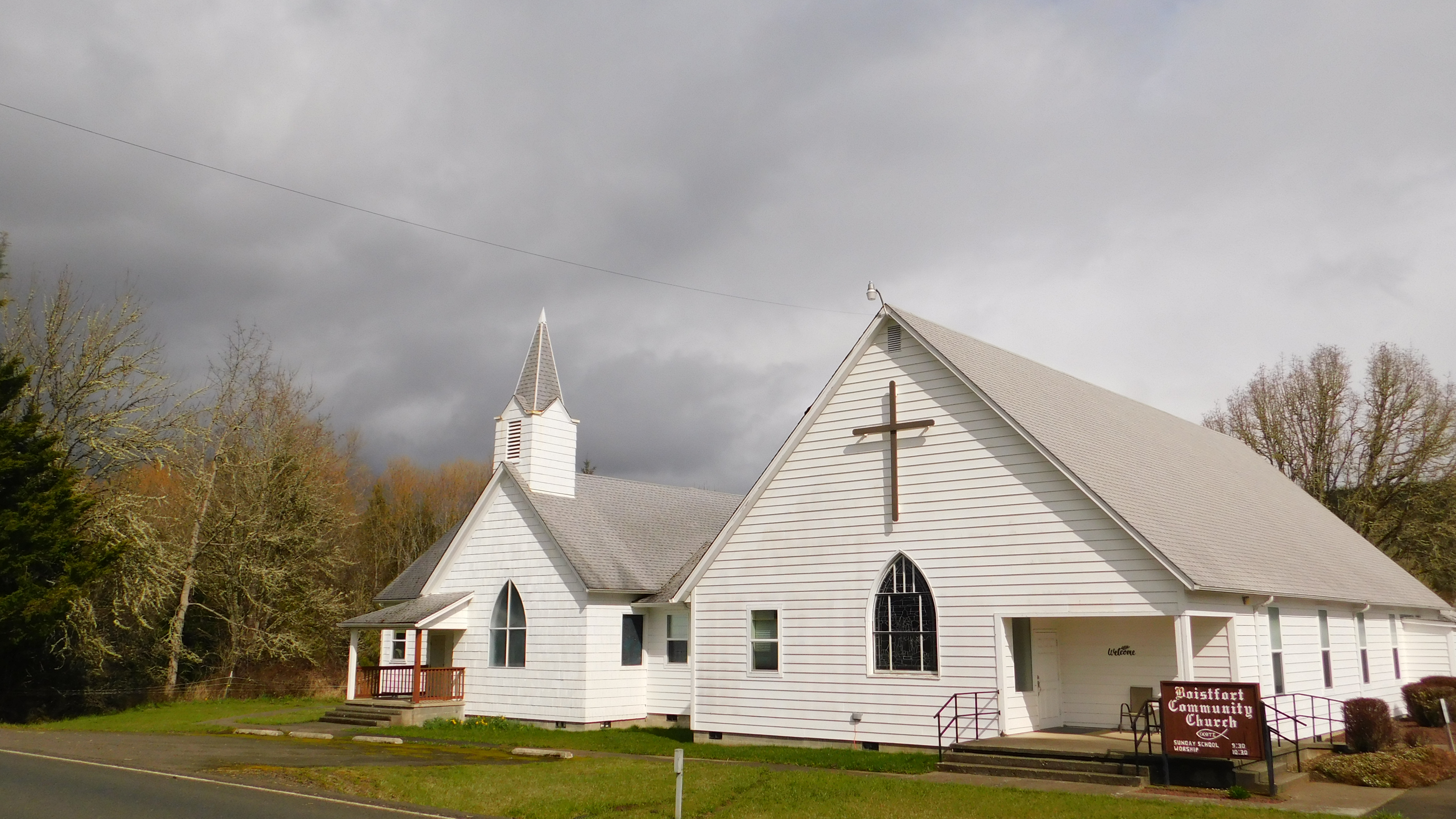
Boistfort Community Church, 2025

Boistfort is located in a prairie valley marked at its eastern edge by the Chehalis River and on the west by Mill Creek. The prairie, when the town was begun, measured approximately 1-mile (1.6 km) wide and 1.5 miles (2.4 km) north-to-south. At the time of settlement, the lands were mostly prairie and lacked any forest cover.

The communities of Curtis and Klaber lie to the immediate north, and the community of Wildwood lies approximately 6 miles (9.7 km) to the south.

== Education ==
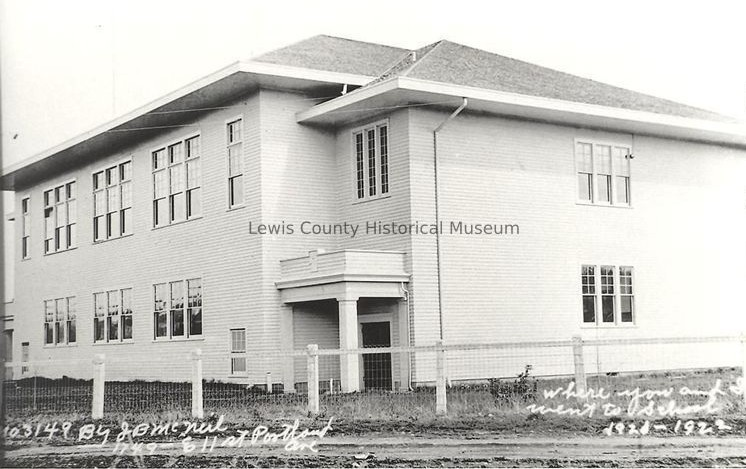
Boistfort School, ca. 1921-1922

In 1853 or 1854, (Note: While reports mention 1853 as the year the first class was taught and when the Boistfort school was built, an equal number of sources list 1854.) the first noted classes were held at the Newland home with 5 enrolled pupils. The original one-room school in Boistfort was established in the autumn of the year and was the first school district in Lewis County and the Territory of Washington. The district was labeled as No. 1.

Boistfort was chosen as the original site for the University of Washington though the college was eventually built in Seattle.

== Government and politics ==
Presidential Elections Results
Year	Republican	Democratic	Third parties
2008	66.5% 143	29.8% 64	3.7% 8
2012	76.2% 154	21.3% 43	2.5% 5
2016	73.8% 141	20.9% 40	5.2% 10
2020	71.5% 181	25.7% 65	2.8% 7
2024	74.0% 182	24.0% 59	2.0% 5

=== Politics ===
As Boistfort is an unincorporated community, there are no defined bounds, and the precinct may be incongruous with the census boundaries.

The 2020 election included 4 votes for candidates of the Libertarian Party and 2 votes for write-in candidates. In the 2024 election, there were 4 votes cast for Robert F. Kennedy Jr..

== Infrastructure ==
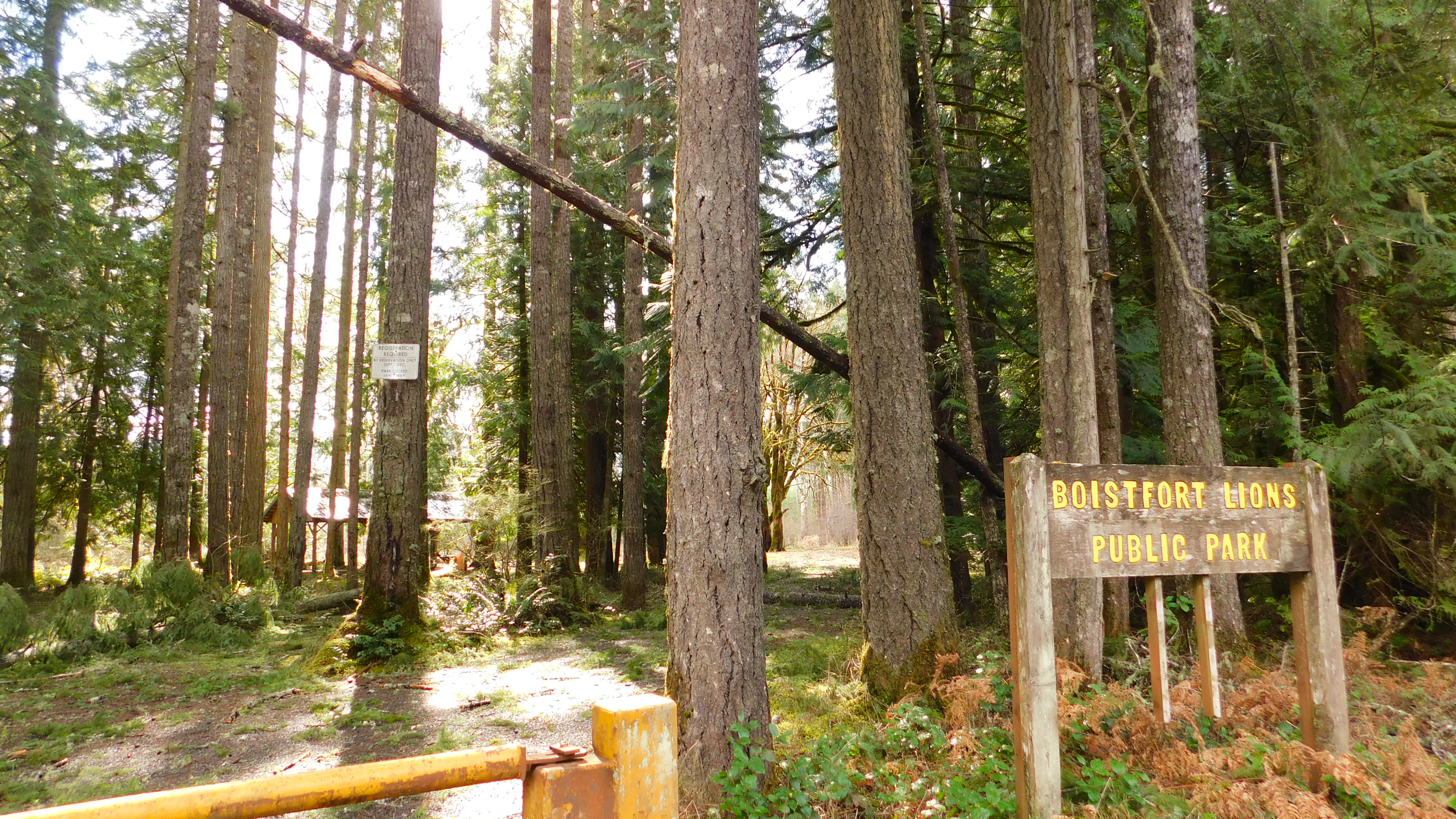
Boistfort Lions Public Park, 2025

Stillman Creek, which courses west of the town center and eventually joins the South Fork Chehalis River, was part of the Chehalis Basin Strategy (CBS) plan to improve aquatic habitats and flood control throughout the watershed. The creek had lost salmon and plant habitats due to a combination of warming waters and erosion brought on by consequences of flooding and human activities. Severe flooding, particularly the 2007 floods, had shifted the outflow and floodplain of the creek. An $8.5 million, four-year project, known as the Stillman Creek Restoration Project, began in 2018 and was to restore the creek through a partnership of various government agencies and local landowners. The work culminated in slowing down the flow of the creek to prevent erosion and restoring the floodplain and course of the waters. The plan also restored 2.0 miles (3.2 km) of the creek habitat for a total of 38 acres (15 ha), and included the planting of native vegetation over 45 acres (18 ha).

Sites near the community were proposed as use for a potential dam. Coming after flooding in the Chehalis River basin after the Great Coastal Gale of 2007, the plan was offered by a group of citizens but the Boistfort dam did not materialize. The CBS program continued to use an additional proposal of a dam by the group for Pe Ell.
