= Wildwood School =

Private K-12 school in Los Angeles, California, United States

Location
- 12201 Washington Place (Elementary School) 11811 Olympic Blvd. (Secondary School); Los Angeles, California 90066; United States; 34°02′01″N 118°27′04″W

Information
- Type: Private K-12 school
- Opened: 1971; 55 years ago (Elementary School); 2000; 26 years ago (Secondary School)
- Head of school: Matt Levinson
- Teaching staff: 91.9 (FTE))
- Grades: K-12
- Gender: Coeducational
- Enrollment: 768 (2023–24)
- Student to teacher ratio: 8.4
- Colors: Blue , Silver
- Mascot: Wolves
- Affiliations: National Association of Independent Schools (NAIS)
- Website: wildwood.org

Wildwood School is an independent progressive K–12 school located in Los Angeles. Wildwood was founded as an elementary school in 1971, by a group of parents led by a lawyer, Belle Mason. The secondary campus (middle and high school) opened in 2000. The elementary campus is in Los Angeles and the middle and upper school campus is in West Los Angeles. There are approximately 350 students in grades K-5, the elementary campus, and 400 in grades 6–12 at the middle and upper school campus.

== History ==
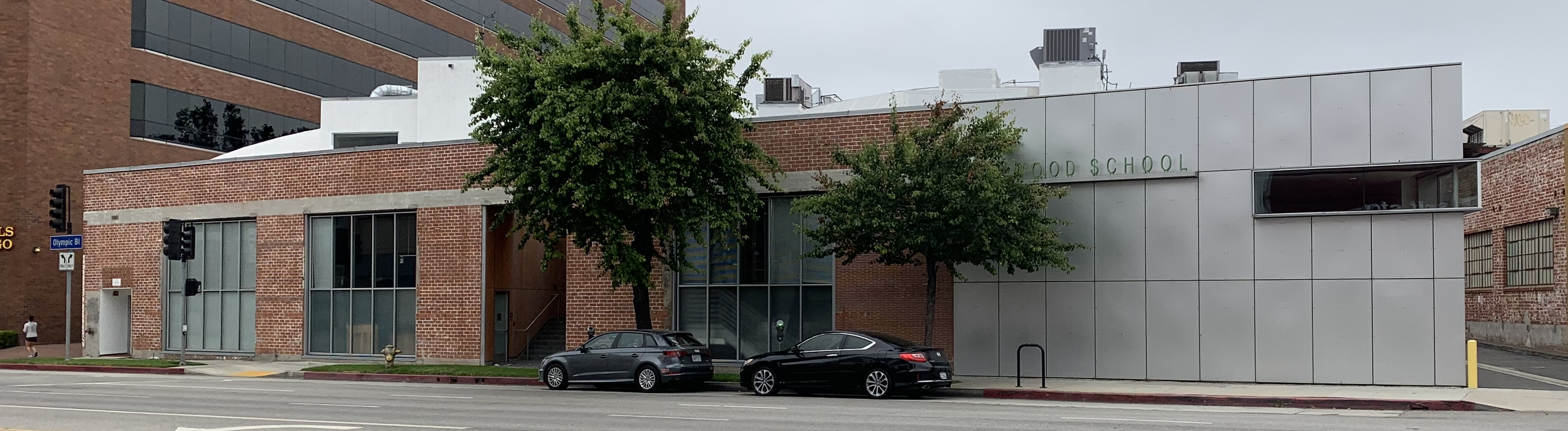
The Olympic Boulevard campus as of May 2021.

In the 1970s and 1980s, the school was housed in one building on Olympic Boulevard in Santa Monica, where the current campus for New Roads School is located. The first graduating elementary class had only ten students. In 1991 Hope Boy], previously the Middle School Head of Westlake School for Girls (now known as Harvard-Westlake School), became the head of Wildwood, and the following year the elementary campus relocated to its current Culver City location.

During Boyd's time in post the number of students doubled. In 1999, the board of trustees decided to create a middle and upper school. The school was to be based on the principles of the Coalition of Essential Schools and teach project-based equitable learning. The middle and upper school opened in 2000 on Olympic Boulevard in West Los Angeles, in a small and limiting former warehouse, with no windows (which has become a subject of humor amongst Wildwood students), mercurial temperature controls, and only 100 students. George Wood, a respected national educator and principal of Federal Hocking High School in Ohio, was the founding director of the secondary school. The full remodeling of the middle and upper school building was finished in 2002.

== Outreach Center ==
In 2001, the Bill & Melinda Gates Foundation granted Wildwood the funds to create an Outreach Center. The mission of the Outreach Center is to support the creation, development, and enhancement of small, personalized, learner-centered schools in Southern California and throughout the nation. The center was given a boost in 2004, when the Los Angeles Unified School District gave its public schools two years to break down into smaller schools. As a result, Wildwood's Outreach Center has held numerous professional development workshops educating public school teachers and administrators on the elements of successful small schools including, Advisory Programs, Project-Based Learning, Habits of Mind and Heart and Portfolios and Exhibitions. In addition, Wildwood School was named a Coalition of Essential Schools mentor school in 2004. In 2005, Wildwood received a National Association of Independent Schools Leading Edge award for the outreach work it has done with public and charter schools.

== Notable alumni ==
- Clementine Creevy – American musician
- Ella Emhoff – Model/designer; stepdaughter of Kamala Harris, former US Vice President
- Zoe Kazan – American actress
- Lewis Pullman – American actor
- Amandla Stenberg – American actress
- Rumer Willis – American actress
- Jackson White – American actor
