= St. Agnes Church (Greenwich, Connecticut) =

Church in Greenwich, Connecticut, United States

Coordinates: 41.0699°N 73.6029°W

The Parish of St. Catherine of Siena and St. Agnes
- The Parish of St. Catherine of Siena and St. Agnes
- Location: 247 Stanwich Road; Greenwich, Connecticut
- Country: United States
- Denomination: Roman Catholic

Architecture
- Architect(s): Charles T. Wills: designer of Wildwood Farm; William DeLuca: redesign for church use

Administration
- Province: Hartford
- Diocese: Bridgeport

Clergy
- Bishop: Most Rev. Frank J. Caggiano
- Pastor: Rev. William F. Platt

St. Agnes is now part of The Parish of St. Catherine of Siena and St. Agnes, a Roman Catholic parish church in Riverside & Greenwich, Connecticut, part of the Diocese of Bridgeport. The church architecture is notable as an example of the adaptive reuse of an early twentieth-century estate carriage house; it has been substantially renovated over the years for more serviceable ecclesiastical means.

== History ==
St. Agnes Parish was founded in 1963 and celebrated its first mass January 24, 1964.

Eventually St. Agnes acquired the estate of Alexander Dommerich, known as Wildwood Farm. The buildings on this estate were designed by Charles T. Wills. In January, 1967 a spectacular fire destroyed the 50-room main house of the estate, built in 1917. After this fire the estate's six-car garage with chauffeur and supervisor's quarters, known as the Carriage House, was converted for church use by William DeLuca.

The original chapel seated 150 people. In 1969 the seating capacity was increased to 350 people. In 1974, a function room was added to the basement of the church and in 1986, the church was renovated once again.

== Mass Schedule ==
The following is the mass schedule for masses held at the St. Agnes Church campus location:

- Sunday - 8:30 AM, 10:00 AM, 11:30 AM (Korean) 6:30 PM (Spanish)
