= Wildwood House (Ferguson, Missouri) =

Historic house in Missouri, United States

- U.S. National Register of Historic Places
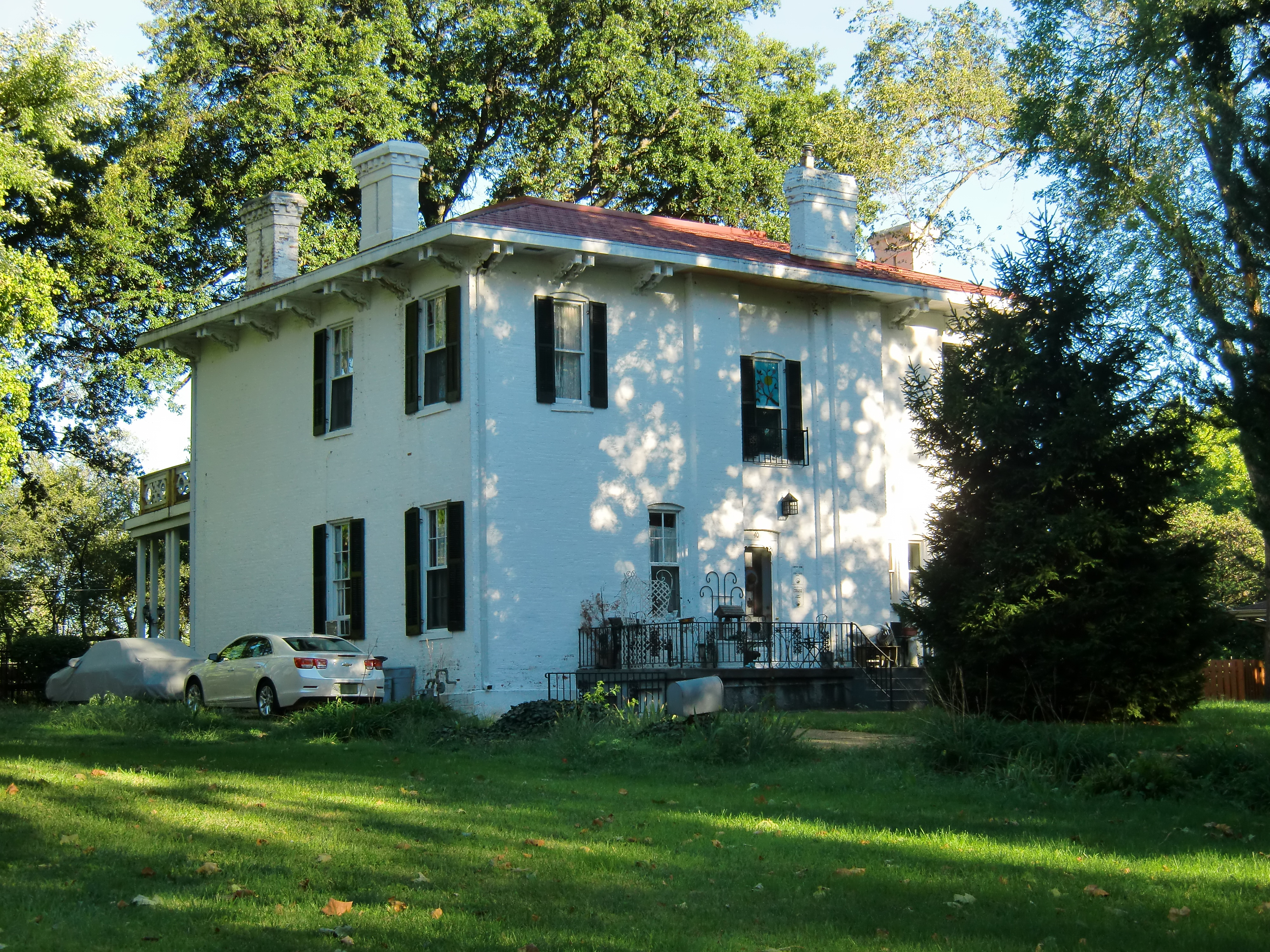

- Location within Missouri Location within the United States
- Location: 40 Dames Court, Ferguson, Missouri
- Coordinates: 38°44′42″N 90°17′30″W
- Built: 1857
- Architectural style: Italianate
- NRHP reference No.: 06000234
- Added to NRHP: April 5, 2006

Wildwood House in Ferguson, Missouri is an Italianate style house built in 1857. It was listed on the National Register of Historic Places in 2006.

It is a rectangular two-story, 44-by-36-foot (13 m × 11 m) white-painted brick masonry Italianate house. It has a low hipped, metal-clad roof, and four chimneys. It was built for Major Joseph LaMotte and his wife Ellen Chambers LaMotte, to serve as a country showplace home. The Hartnett Place subdivision was built around it in 1956.
