= Wildwood Cottage =

Historic house in New Hampshire, United States

- U.S. National Register of Historic Places
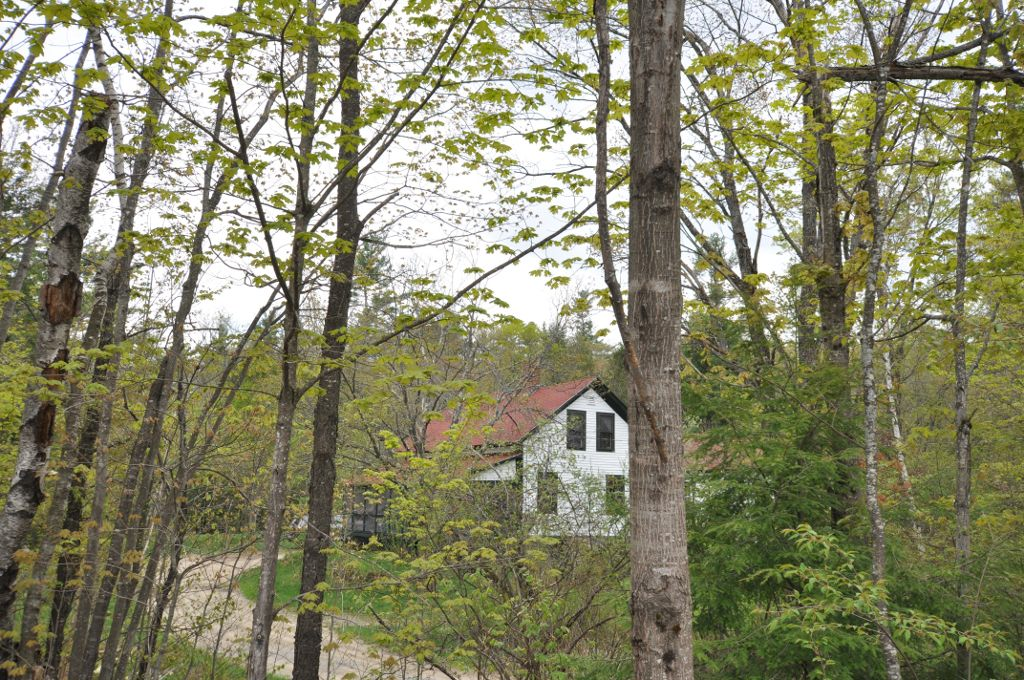

- Location within New Hampshire Location within the United States
- Location: Bancroft Rd., off Tolman Pond Rd., Harrisville, New Hampshire
- Coordinates: 42°57′52″N 72°6′0″W
- Area: 1 acre (0.40 ha)
- Built: 1865
- Architectural style: Greek Revival, Vernacular Greek Revival
- MPS: Harrisville MRA
- NRHP reference No.: 86003240
- Added to NRHP: January 14, 1988

The Wildwood Cottage is a historic house on Bancroft Road in Harrisville, New Hampshire. Built in the 1860s, this 1 1/2-story Greek Revival cottage is one of two surviving houses associated with a small-scale industrial area known as "Mosquitoville". It was probably the residence of the owners of the sawmill at the site. The Mosquitoville complex (of which only the two houses survive), was an economically significant part of the town for nearly 100 years, supplying wooden parts to the mills in the center of Harrisville. This house stylistically resembles some of those built in the village.

The house was listed on the National Register of Historic Places in 1988.

== See also ==
- Timothy Bancroft House
- National Register of Historic Places listings in Cheshire County, New Hampshire
