= Wildwood Plantation =

Historic house in Louisiana, United States

- Wildwood Plantation House
- U.S. National Register of Historic Places
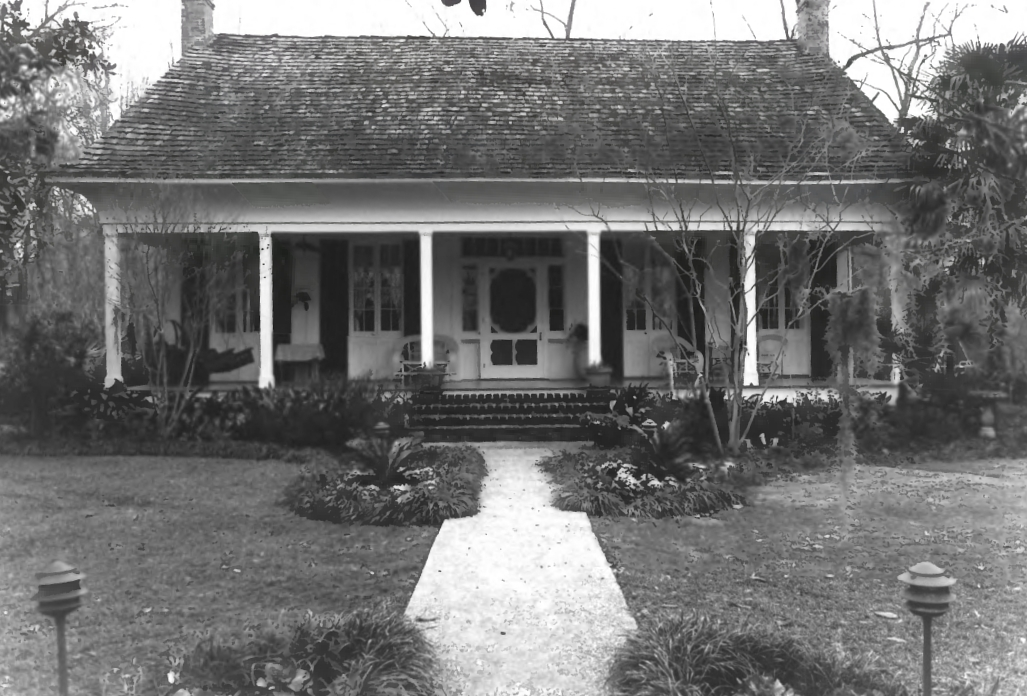

- Location within Louisiana Location within the United States
- Location: Along LA 68, about 9.6 miles (15.4 km) south of Jackson
- Nearest city: Jackson, Louisiana
- Coordinates: 30°42′09″N 91°15′41″W
- Area: 6.1 acres (2.5 ha)
- Built: c.1850
- Architectural style: Greek Revival, Central hall plan
- NRHP reference No.: 88000977
- Added to NRHP: June 30, 1988

The Wildwood Plantation is a Southern plantation with a historic Greek Revival mansion located along LA 68, about 9.6 miles (15.4 km) south of Jackson, Louisiana.

The plantation house was listed on the National Register of Historic Places on June 30, 1988.

== See also ==
- List of plantations in Louisiana
- National Register of Historic Places listings in East Feliciana Parish, Louisiana
