= John Jones =

John Jones may refer to:

== Academics ==
- John Collier Jones (1770–1838), English academic administrator at the University of Oxford
- John Winter Jones (1805–1881), English librarian
- John Carleton Jones (1856–1930), American educator and tenth president of the University of Missouri
- John Robert Jones (1911–1970), Welsh philosopher
- John Jones (academic) (1924–2016), professor at Merton College, Oxford Professor of Poetry 1978–1983
- John Finbarr Jones (1929–2013), Irish–born American academic

== Arts and entertainment ==
=== Literature ===
- John Jones (Jac Glan-y-gors) (1766–1821), Welsh language satirical poet and radical pamphleteer
- John Jones (Talhaiarn) (1810–1869), Welsh poet
- John Beauchamp Jones (1810–1866), American writer
- John Jones (Myrddin Fardd) (1836–1921), Welsh writer
- John Owen Jones (Ap Ffarmwr) (1861–1899), Welsh writer
- John Gwilym Jones (1904–1988), Welsh dramatist, writer, academic and critic
- John Tudor Jones (1903–1985), Welsh journalist, poet and translator
- J'onn J'onzz, fictional Martian superhero of DC Comics, also known as the Martian Manhunter whose human guise is also known as "John Jones"
- John Jones (character), fictional mission controller in the CHERUB book series

=== Performing arts ===
- John Jones (organist) (1728–1796), organist at St Paul's Cathedral
- John Joseph Jones (writer) (1930–2000), British and Australian poet, folk singer, musician, playwright, and theatre director
- John Bush Jones (1940–2019), American author, theatre director, critic and educator
- John Paul Jones (musician) (born 1946), English bassist for Led Zeppelin
- John Pierce Jones (born 1946), Welsh actor
- John Marshall Jones (born 1962), American actor and director
- John "Jonesy" Jones, a character in Fortnite Battle Royale

=== Visual arts ===
- John Jones of Gellilyfdy (1578–1658), Welsh calligrapher, manuscript collector and antiquary
- John Jones (engraver) (1755–1797), British engraver
- John Jones (art collector) (c. 1798/99–1882), English art collector
- John Edward Jones (sculptor) (1806–1862), Irish sculptor
- John Llewellyn Jones (1866–1927), Australian artist and photographer
- John Paul Jones (artist) (1924–1999), American painter and printmaker
- John W. Jones (artist) (born c. 1950), American painter

== Crime and notoriety ==
- Shoni Sguborfawr (John Jones, 1811–1858), Welsh criminal known for role in Rebecca riots
- John Jones (Coch Bach y Bala) (1854–1913), Welsh criminal
- John Jones, alias used in the John Darwin disappearance case

== Military ==
- John Jones Maesygarnedd (c. 1597–1660), Welsh military leader, one of the regicides of King Charles I, member of Cromwell's Upper House
- John Paul Jones (1747–1792), U.S. naval commander of the American Revolutionary War
- Sir John Thomas Jones (1783–1843), British major-general in the Royal Engineers
- John M. Jones (1820–1864), Confederate general in the American Civil War; wounded at Gettysburg
- John R. Jones (general) (1827–1901), Confederate general in the American Civil War at Antietam and Chancellorsville
- John B. Jones (1834–1881), Confederate major in the American Civil War and Texas Ranger captain
- John E. Jones (Medal of Honor) (1834–?), American Civil War recipient of the Medal of Honor
- John Jones (Medal of Honor) (1841–1907), American Civil War recipient of the Medal of Honor
- John Jones (RAF airman), World War I flying ace
- John Cecil Jones (1915–1946), American military veteran who was tortured and lynched near Minden, Louisiana

== Politics and law ==
=== Australia ===
- John Gore Jones (1820–1868), member of the Queensland Legislative Assembly
- John Jones (Queensland politician) (1872–1950), Australian politician
- John Percy Jones (1872–1955), Australian politician
- Jack Jones (Australian politician) (John Joseph Jones, 1907–1997)

=== Canada ===
- John Jones (died 1818) (c. 1752–1818), businessman and political figure in Lower Canada
- John Jones (Bedford politician) (1761–1842), politician in Lower Canada
- John Walter Jones (1878–1954), Canadian politician

=== United Kingdom ===
- John Jones (MP for Gloucester) (died 1630), English politician
- John Jones (Parliamentarian) (1610–1692), English Member of Parliament for the City of London, 1661–1679
- John Gale Jones (1769–1838), English political radical
- John Jones of Ystrad (1777–1842), MP for Carmarthen, 1821–1832
- John Jones (Carmarthenshire MP) (1812–1886), British Member of Parliament for Carmarthenshire, 1868–1880
- John Jones (Ivon) (1820–1898), Welsh radical and man of letters
- John Matthew Jones (1828–1888), British lawyer and naturalist
- John Jones (ironmaster) (1835–1897), English politician and mayor of Wolverhampton
- John Share Jones (1873–1950), British veterinary surgeon and politician
- Jack Jones (Silvertown MP) (John Joseph Jones, 1873–1941), British Labour MP for Silvertown
- Jack Jones (Rotherham MP) (John Henry Jones, 1894–1962), British Labour MP for Bolton, later MP for Rotherham
- John Edward Jones (Welsh politician) (1905–1970), Welsh political organiser
- Sir John Jones (MI5 officer) (1923–1998), Director General of MI5, the United Kingdom's internal security service
- John Walter Jones (Wales) (1946–2020), civil servant and the first Chief Executive of the Welsh Language Board

=== United States ===
- John Coffin Jones Sr. (1750–1829), politician in the Massachusetts House of Representatives
- John Gabriel Jones (1752–1776), colonial American pioneer and politician
- John Rice Jones (1759–1824), American politician, jurist, and pioneer
- John Patterson Jones (1779–1858), New York politician
- John Winston Jones (1791–1848), U.S. congressman from Virginia
- John Coffin Jones Jr. (1796–1861), consular agent to the Kingdom of Hawaii
- John M. Jones (Pennsylvania politician) (1796–1872), American politician from Pennsylvania
- John William Jones (1806–1871), U.S. congressman from Georgia
- John Jones (abolitionist) (1816–1879)
- John Wallace Jones (1822–1895), American judge
- John James Jones (1824–1898), U.S. representative from Georgia
- John P. Jones (Nevada politician) (1829–1912), Republican senator from Nevada and founder of Santa Monica, California
- John Paul Jones (Louisiana politician), state senator in Louisiana
- John H. Jones (American politician) (1836–1875), member of the Wisconsin State Senate
- John S. Jones (1836–1903), Union brevet brigadier general and later U.S. congressman from Ohio
- John Edward Jones (governor) (1840–1896), Welsh-born governor of Nevada
- John D. Jones (Minnesota politician) (1849–1914), speaker of the Minnesota House of Representatives
- John Jones (county commissioner) (1816–1878), member of the Cook County Board of Commissioners in Illinois
- John Jones (Los Angeles politician), president of the Los Angeles, California, Common Council 1870–1871
- John R. Jones (Wisconsin politician) (1850–?), member of the Wisconsin State Assembly
- John George Jones (1854–1914), American lawyer
- Evan John Jones (politician) (1872–1952), U.S. representative from Pennsylvania
- John R. Jones (Washington politician) (1877–1972), member of the Washington House of Representatives
- John Marvin Jones (1882–1976), U.S. Representative from Texas
- John D. Jones (Washington politician) (1923–2014), Welsh-American politician in the state of Washington
- John Bailey Jones (1927–2023), South Dakota state representative 1957–1960 and U.S. federal judge
- John O. Jones (born 1940), Illinois state senator
- John E. Jones III (born 1955), U.S. federal judge for the Middle District of Pennsylvania
- John Jones (abolitionist) (1817–1879), American abolitionist, civil rights leader, philanthropist, and businessman
- John W. Jones (Alabama politician), state legislator in Alabama

=== Elsewhere ===
- John Jones (Ojibwa chief) (1798–1847), Chief of the Credit Mission Ojibwa, 1840–1847
- John Richard Jones (died 1911), 19th century New Zealand politician

== Religion ==
- John Jones (Benedictine) (1575–1636), Welsh Benedictine monk
- John Jones (martyr) (died 1598), Welsh saint
- John Jones (physician, died 1709) (1644/5–1709), Welsh cleric, inventor and physician
- John Jones (dean of Bangor) (1650–1727), Dean of Bangor Cathedral
- John Jones (controversialist) (1700–1770), Welsh clergyman
- John Jones (Unitarian) (1766–1827), Welsh minister, critic, tutor and lexicographer
- John Jones (literary patron) (1773–1853), Welsh priest, scholar and literary patron
- John Elias (born John Jones, 1774–1841), Welsh preacher
- John Jones (archdeacon of Merioneth) (1775–1834), Welsh priest and writer
- Llef o'r Nant (pseudonym of John Jones, 1782/87–1863), Welsh priest and antiquarian
- John Jones (archdeacon of Liverpool) (1791–1889)
- John Jones (Tegid) (1792–1852), Welsh clergyman and writer
- John Jones, Talysarn (1796–1857), Welsh preacher
- John Jones (archdeacon of Bangor) (1798–1863), Welsh Anglican priest
- John Taylor Jones (1802–1851), Protestant missionary to Siam, now Thailand
- John Wynne Jones (1803–1888), Welsh Anglican priest
- John Harris Jones (1827–1885), Calvinistic Methodist minister and classical tutor
- John Hugh Jones (1843–1910), Welsh Roman Catholic priest
- John Daniel Jones (1865–1942), Welsh Congregational minister
- John Islan Jones (1874–1968), Welsh Unitarian minister and writer
- John Jones (bishop) (1904–1956), Welsh Anglican missionary and Bishop of Bangor
- John Jones (archdeacon of St Asaph) (1905–1996), Welsh Anglican archdeacon

== Science and medicine ==
- John Jones (doctor) (1729–1791), American surgeon
- John Jones (16th-century physician), Welsh physician
- John Jones (physician, died 1709), Welsh physician
- John Jones (astronomer) (1818–1898), Welsh amateur astronomer
- John Welch Jones (1826–1916), American medical doctor and Civil War cavalry officer
- John Jones (geologist) (1835–1877), English geologist
- John Viriamu Jones (1856–1901), British scientist and educationalist
- John Chris Jones (1927–2022), Welsh engineer
- John Spencer Jones (1924–2007), British chest physician

== Sports ==
=== American football ===
- John Jones (American football executive) (born 1952)
- John Jones (tight end) (born 1975)
- John "J. J." Jones (1952–2009), quarterback
- John "Lam" Jones (1958–2019), American sprinter and professional football wide receiver

=== Association football (soccer) ===
- John Jones (footballer, born 1856) (1856–1889), Druids F.C. and Wales international footballer
- John Jones (footballer, born 1860) (1860–1902), Berwyn Rangers F.C. and Wales international footballer
- John Owen Jones (footballer) (1871–1955), Bangor F.C., Newton Heath F.C. and Wales international footballer
- John H. Jones (footballer) (1873–1955), British footballer in the 1900 Olympics
- John Love Jones (1885–1913), Stoke F.C., Middlesbrough F.C. and Wales international footballer
- John Jones (footballer, born 1895) (1895–1962), Welsh footballer
- John Jones (footballer, born 1916) (1916–1978), Welsh footballer
- John Jones (soccer) (born 1973), retired American soccer midfielder

=== Cricket ===
- John Thomas Jones (1783–1843), English cricketer
- John Jones (English cricketer) (1858–1937)
- John Jones (cricketer) (1899–1991), Australian cricketer

=== Rugby ===
- Arthur Jones (rugby union, born 1856) (John Arthur Jones, 1856–1919), Welsh international rugby union forward
- John Jones known as Bala Jones, Wales international rugby player
- Jack Jones (rugby, born 1890) (John Jones, 1890–?), rugby union and rugby league footballer of the 1910s for Wales (RU), Abertillery, and Oldham (RL)
- John Jones (rugby league) (born 1966), Australian rugby league player for the Manly Sea Eagles and South Queensland Crushers
- Johnny Jones (rugby league) (1919–?), English rugby league footballer of the 1940s for Leeds, and Wakefield Trinity

=== Other sports ===
- John Paul Jones (runner) (1890–1970), American track athlete
- John Jones (baseball) (1901–1956), American baseball player
- John Jones (rower) (1930–2011), British rower
- John Jones (racing driver) (born 1965), Canadian racecar driver
- John Jones (golfer) (1863–1921), English professional golfer
- John Jones (water polo) (1925–2016), British Olympic water polo player
- John Jones (sprinter) (born 1940), Welsh athlete
- John Edward Jones (1983–2009), caver who died in the Nutty Putty Cave

== Others ==
- Johnny Jones (pioneer) (1809–1869), Australian and New Zealand settler and pioneer
- John W. Jones (ex-slave) (1817–1900), American ex-slave
- Casey Jones (1864–1900), American folk hero
- John H. Jones and Carrie Otis Jones (c. 1834–1902), American property developers
- John Treasure Jones (1905–1993), British sea officer
- John F. Jones Jr., chief information officer of the National Institutes of Health
- John D. Jones (pilot boat), a 19th-century Sandy Hook pilot boat
- John Elfed Jones (born 1933), Welsh businessman and language activist
- John Tecumseh Jones, Chippewa leader and businessman

== See also ==
- Jon Jones (disambiguation)
- Johnny Jones (disambiguation)
- Jonathan Jones (disambiguation)
- Jack Jones (disambiguation)
- John Paul Jones (disambiguation)
- John P. Jones (disambiguation)
- John Whitworth-Jones (1896–1981), Royal Air Force air marshal
