= John W. Jones =

John W. Jones may refer to:

== Political figures ==
- John William Jones (1806–1871), U.S. congressman from Georgia
- John Winston Jones (1791–1848), U.S. congressman from Virginia
- John Walter Jones (1878–1954), Canadian Premier of Prince Edward Island, 1943–1953
- John Walter Jones (Wales), chief executive of the Welsh Language Board, 1993
- John W. Jones (Alabama politician), state legislator in Alabama

== Others ==
- John W. Jones (ex-slave) (1817–1900), notable ex-slave
- John W. Jones (artist), American artist
- Lam Jones (John Wesley Jones, born 1958), U.S. sprinter and professional American football player
- J.W. Jones (1894–1979), Northwest Missouri State University president

== See also ==
- John Jones (disambiguation)
