= Johnny Jones =

Johnny Jones may refer to:

== Sports ==
=== Gridiron football ===
- Johnnie Jones (born 1962), American football running back in the Canadian Football League
- Johnny Jones (American football) (born 1988), American football defensive tackle
- Johnny "Lam" Jones (1958–2019), American sprinter and professional football wide receiver

=== Other sports ===
- Johnny Jones (pitcher) (1892–1980), American baseball player
- Johnny Jones (outfielder) (1899–?), American Negro leagues baseball player
- Johnny Jones (basketball, born 1943), American basketball player
- Johnny Jones (basketball, born 1961), American basketball coach
- Johnny Jones (boxer), Welsh flyweight boxing champion
- Johnny Jones (rugby league), rugby league footballer of the 1930s and 1940s

== Others ==
- Johnny Jones (pioneer) (1809–1869), pioneer New Zealand settler
- Little Johnny Jones (pianist) (1924–1964), American Chicago blues pianist and singer
- Johnny "Yard Dog" Jones (1941–2015), American blues singer, musician and songwriter
- Johnnie Jones (lawyer) (1919–2022), American military veteran, civil rights activist, and politician
- Johnny J. Jones (1874–1930), American carnival showman
- Velma Jones, Canadian drag performer

== See also ==
- John Jones (disambiguation)
- Jonathan Jones (disambiguation)
