= Jack Jones =

Jack Jones may refer to:

== Arts and entertainment ==
=== Music ===
- Jack Jones (American singer) (1938–2024), American jazz and pop singer
- Jack Jones, stage name of Australian singer Irwin Thomas (born 1971)
- Jack Jones (Welsh musician) (born 1992), Welsh musician, songwriter and poet

=== Other media ===
- Jack Jones (novelist) (1884–1970), Welsh novelist and playwright
- Jack Jones (journalist) (1924–2011), American journalist
- Jack Jones (TV journalist) (1949–1991), American television journalist

=== Fictional characters ===
- Lance-Corporal Jack Jones, a character in the sitcom Dad's Army
- Jack Jones, a banker in the Oliver Stone film Nixon

== Politics ==
- Jack Jones (Silvertown MP) (1873–1941), British Labour MP for Silvertown
- Jack Jones (Rotherham MP) (1894–1962), British Labour MP for Bolton, later MP for Rotherham
- Jack Jones (Australian politician) (1907–1997), member of the Victorian Legislative Council for Ballarat
- Jack Jones (trade unionist) (1913–2009), British trade union leader

== Sports ==
=== Association football (soccer) ===
- Jack Jones (footballer, born 1869) (1866–1931), Wales international footballer who played for Grimsby Town, Sheffield United and Tottenham
- Jack Jones (footballer, born 1874) (1874–1904), English football forward for Small Heath, Bristol Rovers and Tottenham
- Jack Jones (footballer, born 1891) (1891–1948), English football defender for Birmingham, Nelson and Crewe
- Jack Jones (1920s Welsh footballer), footballer for Wrexham and Crewe Alexandra
- Jack Jones (footballer, born 1907), Irish football defender for Linfield, Hibernian, Glenavon, Bath City and Ireland (IFA)
- Jack Jones (footballer, born 1913) (1913–1995), English football player for Everton and Sunderland
- Jack Jones (footballer, born 1916) (1916–1999), Scottish footballer
- Jack Jones (footballer, born 1921) (1921–2001), Welsh footballer for Wrexham, Doncaster Rovers and New Brighton
- Jack Jones (soccer, born 1987) (born 1987), American soccer player

=== Australian rules football ===
- Jack Jones (footballer, born 1887) (1887–1964), Australian rules footballer for South Melbourne
- Jack Jones (footballer, born 1888) (1888–1960), Australian rules footballer for University
- Jack Jones (footballer, born 1924) (1924–2020), Australian rules footballer for Essendon

=== Rugby ===
- Jack Jones (rugby union, born 1886) (1886–1951), Welsh international rugby union player
- Jack Jones (rugby, born 1890) (1890–?), rugby union and league footballer for Wales (RU), Abertillery, and Oldham (RL)
- Jack Jones (Australian rugby league) (fl. 1925–1933), Australian rugby league player

=== Other sports ===
- Jumping Jack Jones (1860–1936), American baseball pitcher
- Jack Jones (cricketer) (1899–1991), cricketer for Western Australia and Australian rules football player and coach
- Jack Jones (water polo) (1925–2016), English Olympic water polo player
- Jack Jones (American football) (born 1997), American football player

== Other ==
- Jack Harold Jones (1964–2017), American serial killer

== See also ==
- John Jones (disambiguation)
- Jack & Jones, clothing brand owned by Danish clothing company Bestseller
- Jak Jones (born 1993), Welsh professional snooker player
