= Senator Wimberly =

Senator Wimberly may refer to:

- Benjie Wimberly (born 1964), New Jersey State Senate
- Dred Wimberly (1848–1937), North Carolina State Senate
- Rush Wimberly (1873–1943), Louisiana State Senate
