= George Hilton Jones III =

American academic & writer (1924-2008)

George Hilton Jones III, D. Phil (Oxon) (1924–2008) was an American Rhodes Scholar, historian, college professor, and author of numerous works on English history.

== Early life ==
Jones was the descendant of a prominent Louisiana family, his grandfather, Dr. John Welch Jones, having been superintendent of the Louisiana State Insane Asylum at Jackson, Louisiana. Jones was born in Baton Rouge, Louisiana, on January 11, 1924, to Judge William Carruth Jones and pianist Elizabeth Fly Kirkpatrick, formerly of Natchez, Mississippi. He was baptized at the First Methodist Church (now First United Methodist Church) of Baton Rouge, where his mother was a member.

Jones was the fifth of five children. His family was accomplished, his father being a graduate of Tulane University School of Law, a member of the Baton Rouge bar, and a judge of the City Court of Baton Rouge, later the 19th District Court, and then the First Circuit Court of Appeal. His mother was a graduate of the New England Conservatory of Music and a concert pianist. The family resided in a Dutch colonial home at 2103 Government Street in Baton Rouge.

Jones attended the Louisiana State University Laboratory School from 1935 until his graduation in 1940. He then attended Louisiana State University for the 1940-41 term where he had all "A"s in his classes.

== West Point ==
Jones was appointed to the United States Military Academy at West Point, New York, in 1941. He attended the military academy for a year. He scored 288 in mathematics, 38 in French, and 19 in English. His class rank was 552. A broken leg forced him to withdraw from the academy after one year.

== Military service ==
Jones was enlisted in the United States Army on 9 December 1942, but he was not called for active service until 7 April 1943. His serial number was 18 246 970. He was sent to Camp Roberts, California, where he was assigned to the 97th Infantry Division. His military specialty was “rifleman, code 745”. The division departed the United States on 19 February 1945 and arrived at Le Havre, France on 2 March 1945 and briefly saw action in Germany and Czechoslovakia before the end of hostilities in Europe. A photograph shows Jones in uniform with other soldiers in Germany. He arrived back in the USA on 25 June 1945.

Jones was honorably discharged from the United States Army on 15 November 1945 at the LaGarde General Hospital, New Orleans with a certificate of disability. He was honorably discharged with the rank of private first class and entitled to a Good Conduct Medal, an American Theater Medal, and EAME Theater Medal, and a World War II Victory Medal. Jones was credited with 4 months and 7 days of foreign service.

== Undergraduate studies ==
Jones then enrolled at Louisiana State University at Baton Rouge where he joined the Zeta Zeta chapter of Delta Kappa Epsilon social fraternity, where his three older brothers also were members. He was also a member of Phi Kappa Phi and Phi Eta Sigma honor societies. He studied modern European history and took his B. A. degree in 1947.

== Rhodes scholar ==
Jones was selected to receive a Rhodes scholarship to Oxford University, England in 1947. Jones resided in St. Edmund Hall during his studies at Oxford. Jones' mother, Mrs. Elizabeth Kirkpatrick Jones travelled by the S. S. America to visit him in England in 1949. Jones received his D. Phil. in 1950 and then returned to the United States.

== Early career ==
Jones held several short-term teaching positions at various colleges:

- Instructor, Hofstra College (1950–51)
- Visiting Assistant Professor of History, Indiana University (1951–52)
- Assistant Professor of History, Washington College (1954–56)
- Assistant Professor of History, Texas Technological University (1958–60)
- Associate Professor of History, Kansas State University (1961–64)
- Associate Professor of History, Olivet College 1964-66

Jones also spent time doing editing and free-lance writing (1953–54, 1966–68), taking on historical projects for the March of Dimes and the Southern Regional Education Board.

He was honored by the Newberry Library with a fellowship in 1959 and by the Guggenheim Foundation with a fellowship in 1960-61, which enabled him to carry out research in England.

== Later career ==
Jones accepted a position at Eastern Illinois University in Charleston, Illinois, as associate professor of history in 1966 where he remained for the remainder of his career, rising to full professor and then professor emeritus. Jones retired from active teaching in 1989.

Jones resided at 1530 Third Street, Charleston, Illinois, within walking distance of the University. Jones continued to reside in Charleston, Illinois, where he had many friends after his retirement from active teaching.

== Field of study ==
Jones was an acknowledged expert in English history of the 17th and 18th century, which included the Glorious Revolution, the English Bill of Rights, the installation and reign of William III and Mary II on the throne of England, and the attempt by Bonnie Prince Charlie to attain the throne. Jones typically spent his summers in England or other nearby countries where he carried out research in various libraries and archives. He was fluent in Italian and French and read German and Dutch, which was necessary for his research.

Jones was a fellow of the Royal Historical Society.

Jones was also an expert on the question of the succession to the throne of Tuscany, which arose because of the failure of the Medici family to produce an heir.

== Publications ==
=== Books ===
- The Main Stream of Jacobitism. Cambridge: Harvard University Press, 1954.
- Charles Middleton: The Life and Times of a Restoration Politician. Chicago: University of Chicago Press, 1967.
- Convergent Forces: Immediate Causes of the Revolution of 1688 in England. Ames: Iowa State University Press, 1990.
- Great Britain and the Tuscan Succession Question, 1719-1737. New York: Vantage Press, 1999 (ISBN 0533126681).

=== Articles ===
Jones published numerous articles in various scholarly historical journals. Three of his articles were published in Italian by the prestigious Archivio Storico Italiano, published by Casa Editrice Leo S. Olschki of Florence.

- Inghilterra, Granducato di Toscana, e Quadriplice Alleanza.
- La Gran Bretagna e la Destinazione di Don Carlos al Trono di Toscana (1721–1732)
- La Gran Bretagna e al Fine della Questione della Successione al Trono Granducale (1732–1737).

== Death ==
Jones died at Charleston, Illinois, on Thursday, January 24, 2008 (age 84) after a stroke. He was interred on February 1, 2008 in the Jones family plot in Roselawn Memorial Park, Baton Rouge, Louisiana, after a graveside ceremony officiated by Rev. Doctor Richard Gates of the First Presbyterian Church.
