= John Joseph Jones =

John Joseph Jones may refer to:

- Jack Jones (Silvertown MP) (1873–1941), British Member of Parliament (MP)
- Jack Jones (Australian politician) (1907–1997), Australian politician
- John Joseph Jones (writer) (1930–2000), British and Australian poet, folk singer, musician, playwright, and theatre director

== See also ==
- John Jones (disambiguation)
- Jack Jones (disambiguation)
- Joseph Jones (disambiguation)
