= Philip Powell (martyr) =

Lawyer who became a Benedictine monk and priest

Blessed Philip Powell O.S.B
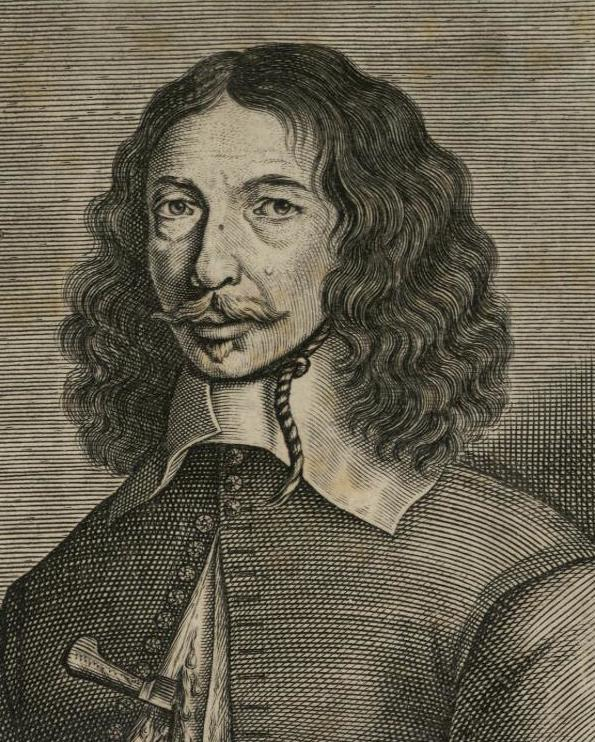

Martyr
- Born: 2 February 1594; Trallong, Brecknockshire, Wales
- Died: 30 June 1646 (aged 52); Tyburn, London, England
- Venerated in: Roman Catholicism
- Beatified: 15 December 1929 by Pope Pius XI
- Feast: 30 June

Philip Powell (sometimes spelled Philip Powel) (2 February 1594 – 30 June 1646) was a lawyer who became a Benedictine monk and priest, serving as a missionary in England during the period of recusancy. He was martyred at Tyburn.

== Early life ==
Born in Trallong, Brecknockshire, Wales, Powell was the son of Roger ap Rosser Powell and Catherine Morgan, and attended Abergavenny grammar school. From 1610 to 1614 he was a student of law, taught principally by Benedictine David Baker. Baker subsidized Powell's further studied at the University of Louvain.

== Priesthood ==
In 1618 he was ordained priest and then joined the Benedictines, becoming part of the community of St. Gregory at Douai (now at Downside Abbey. At Douai, he studied under Welsh Benedictine, Leander Jones, and held the position of cellarer. In 1622 left Douai to go on mission in England. He stayed for over a year with Baker in Gray's Inn Lane, London. Around 1624 he became chaplain to the Poyntz family at Leighland, Somerset. For the next twenty years he served as chaplain to various families in Devon and Somerset.

When the English Civil War broke out he stayed for a few months with Mr. John Trevelyan of Yarnscombe and then with Mr. John Coffin of Parkham in Devon. He then served for six months as chaplain to the Catholic soldiers in General Goring's army in Cornwall, and, when that force was disbanded, took ship for South Wales. The vessel was captured on 22 February 1646, and Powell was recognised and denounced as a priest.

== Imprisonment and martyrdom ==
On 11 May he was sent to London and confined in St. Catherine's Gaol, Southwark, where his treatment brought on a severe attack of pleurisy. His trial, which had been fixed for 30 May, did not take place until 9 June, at Westminster Hall. He was found guilty of being a priest and was hanged, drawn, and quartered at Tyburn. It is recorded that when informed of his death sentence, Powell exclaimed "Oh what am I that God thus honours me and will have me to die for his sake?" and called for a glass of sack.

He was beatified by Pope Pius XI in 1929.
