= John Paul Jones (disambiguation) =

John Paul Jones (1747–1792) was a Scottish-American naval commander during the American Revolutionary War.

John Paul Jones may also refer to:

== People ==
- John Paul Jones (artist) (1924–1999), American painter and printmaker
- John Paul Jones (runner) (1890–1970), previous record holder in the mile run
- John Paul Jones (musician) (born 1946), best known as a member of the English rock group Led Zeppelin
- John Paul Jones (Louisiana politician), state senator in Louisiana
- John Paul DeJoria (born John Paul Jones DeJoria, 1944), American entrepreneur billionaire
- Johnpaul Jones (born 1941), American architect
- John Paul Jones (born 1995), a contestant on both season 15 of The Bachelorette and season 6 of Bachelor in Paradise

=== Fictional characters ===
- Cappie (Captain John Paul Jones), a character from the TV series Greek

== Facilities and structures ==
- John Paul Jones Junior High School, Philadelphia, Pennsylvania, USA; a school building
- John Paul Jones School, an elementary school at Cavite City, Philippines' U.S. Navy's Naval Station Sangley Point
- John Paul Jones Arena, a sports venue at the University of Virginia
- John Paul Jones House, Portsmouth, New Hampshire, USA
- John Paul Jones Cottage Museum, Arbigland Estate, Kirkbean, Kirkcudbrightshire, Dumfries and Galloway, Scotland, UK
- John Paul Jones Memorial Park, Kittery, Maine, USA
- John Paul Jones Park, Fort Hamilton, Bay Ridge, Brooklyn, NYC, NYS, USA

== Entertainment ==
- John Paul Jones (film), a 1959 biographical film about the naval commander
- John Paul Jones, a 2001 musical about the naval commander by Scottish composer Julian Wagstaff
- John Paul Jones, a John Coltrane song off the 1956 Paul Chambers album Chambers' Music

== Other uses ==
- USS John Paul Jones, a U.S. Navy ship; the name of two American destroyers
- Operation John Paul Jones (1966) a U.S.-Vietnam War military operation in Vietnam

== See also ==
- John Paul Jones flag
- John Paul Jones Crypt, United States Naval Academy, Annapolis, Maryland, USA; in the Naval Academy Chapel
- John Paul Jones Memorial, West Potomac Park, Washington, D.C., USA
- John P. Jones (disambiguation)
- John Paul (disambiguation)
- Paul Jones (disambiguation)
- John Jones (disambiguation)
- John (disambiguation)
- Paul (disambiguation)
- Jones (disambiguation)
- John Paul Joans (1930-2011), British comedian
