= John Wesley Jones =

John Wesley Jones is the name of

- John Wesley Jones (ambassador) (1907–1998), US Foreign Service officer, United States Ambassador to Libya (1958–1962)
- Johnny "Lam" Jones (1958–2019), American sprinter and football player

== See also ==
- John Jones (disambiguation)
