= Paul Jones =

Paul Jones may refer to:

== Sports ==
=== Association football ===
- Paul Jones (footballer, born May 1953), former Bolton Wanderers defender
- Paul Jones (footballer, born September 1953), English football midfielder for Mansfield Town
- Paul Jones (footballer, born 1965), English former footballer for Walsall and Wolverhampton Wanderers
- Paul Jones (footballer, born 1967), Wales international goalkeeper
- Paul Jones (Bury footballer) (fl. 1984), see List of Bury F.C. players (1–24 appearances)
- Paul Jones (footballer, born 1974), former Birmingham City winger
- Paul Jones (footballer, born 1976), former Wrexham defender
- Paul Jones (footballer, born 1978), former Oldham Athletic defender
- Paul Jones (footballer, born 1986), goalkeeper, currently with King's Lynn Town

=== Other sports ===
- Paul Jones (basketball) (born 1989), American basketball player
- Paul Jones (boxer) (born 1966), British former professional boxer
- Paul Jones (mixed martial artist) (born 1963), former mixed martial artist
- Paul Jones (wrestler) (born Paul Frederick,1942–2018), retired professional wrestler and manager
- Paul Jones, an earlier wrestler, (born Andrew Lutzi, died 1988) later the owner of Georgia Championship Wrestling while still under his ring name
- Paul Jones (American football) (born 1992), American football quarterback
- Paul Jones (sportscaster), born 1958, radio play-by-play man for the Toronto Raptors
- Paul Jones (pole vaulter) (born 1902), American pole vaulter and long jumper, winner of the pole vault at the 1925 USA Indoor Track and Field Championships

== Politics and government ==
- Paul Jones (Australian politician) (1878–1972), Australian politician
- Paul Jones (Navajo chairman) (1895–1971), chairman of Navajo Tribal Council
- Paul Jones (judge) (1880–1965), U.S. federal judge
- Paul C. Jones (1901–1981), U.S. representative from Missouri
- Paul F. Jones (1909–1960), first African-American elected to Pittsburgh, Pennsylvania's City Council
- Paul W. Jones (born 1960), U.S. ambassador to Poland and former U.S. ambassador to Malaysia

== Arts and entertainment ==
- Paul Jones (film producer) (1901–1968), American film producer
- Paul Jones (singer) (born 1942), BBC Radio 2 DJ and singer in Manfred Mann
- Paul Carey Jones (born 1974), Welsh operatic baritone
- Paul "Wine" Jones (1946–2005), American blues musician
- Paul R. Jones (1928–2010), American collector of African-American art
- Paul Jones, 1889 English adaptation of Surcouf (opéra comique)

== Other people ==
- Lynching of Paul Jones, 1919
- Paul Jones (bishop) (1880–1941), American Episcopal bishop
- Paul Jones (computer technologist) (born 1950), American computer technologist
- Paul Roland Jones, 20th-century American criminal associated with the Chicago Outfit
- Paul Tudor Jones (born 1954), American hedge fund manager, conservationist and philanthropist

== Other uses ==
- Paul Jones (horse) (1917–1930), American thoroughbred racehorse and winner of 1920 Kentucky Derby
- Paul Jones (1843 ship), a Medford-built ship that brought the first cargo of ice to China
- Paul Jones, a mixer dance
- USS Paul Jones (1862), a gunboat of the Union Navy
- USS Paul Jones (DD-10), a Bainbridge-class destroyer in the United States Navy
- USS Paul Jones (DD-230), a Clemson-class destroyer in the United States Navy

== See also ==
- John Paul Jones (disambiguation)
- List of people with surname Jones
- Paul Jonas (disambiguation)
