= Center for Information Technology =

The Center for Information Technology (CIT) is one of the 27 institutes and centers that compose the National Institutes of Health (NIH), an agency of the U.S. Department of Health and Human Services (HHS), a cabinet-level department of the Executive Branch of the United States Federal Government. Originating in 1954 as a central processing facility in the NIH Office of the Director, the Division of Computer Research and Technology was established in 1964, merging in 1998 with the NIH Office of the CIO and the NIH Office of Research Services Telecommunications Branch to form a new organization, the CIT.

== Mission ==
CIT provides and manages information technology and advances computational scientific development. CIT supports NIH and other Federal research and management programs with administrative and scientific computing. In addition to providing bioinformatics support and scientific tools and resources, CIT provides enterprise technological and computational support for the NIH community; services include networking, telecommunications, application development and hosting services, technical support, computer training, IT acquisition, and IT security.

CIT's activities include the following:

- engages in collaborative research and provides collaborative support to NIH investigators in the area of computational bioscience;
- provides information systems and networking services;
- provides scientific and administrative computing facilities;
- identifies new computing technologies with application to biomedical research;
- creates, purchases, and distributes software applications;
- provides NIH staff with computing information, expertise, and training;
- provides data-processing and computing facilities, integrated telecommunications data networks, and services to the U.S. Department of Health and Human Services (DHHS) and other Federal agencies;
- serves as a data center to HHS and other Federal agencies; and
- develops, administers, and manages NIH systems and provides consulting services to NIH Institutes and Centers (ICs), in support of administrative and business applications.

== History and organization ==
Key highlights of CIT are listed at the following link: https://www.nih.gov/about-nih/nih-almanac/center-information-technology-cit

=== Past Directors ===
| No. | Portrait | Name | In office from | To | Refs. |
|---|---|---|---|---|---|
| 1 | | Dr. Arnold W. Pratt | August 1966 | May 1990 | |
| 2 | | Dr. David Rodbard | November 5, 1990 | April 1996 | |
| Acting | | William L. Risso | April 1996 | March 1998 | |
| 3 | | Alan S. Graeff | March 1998 | November 2005 | |
| Acting | | Dr. John F. Jones, Jr. | November 2005 | February 2011 | |
| Acting | | Thomas G. Murphy | February 2011 | October 2011 | |
| 4 | | Andrea Norris | October 2011 | December 31, 2022 | |
| acting | | Ivor D'Souza | January 1, 2023 | March 23, 2024 | |
| 5 | | Sean Mooney | March 24, 2024 | present | |

=== Past NIH CIOs ===
| Name | In office from | To |
|---|---|---|
| Alan S. Graeff | March 1998 | November 2005 |
| Dr. John F. Jones, Jr. (Acting) | November 2005 | June 2008 |
| Dr. John F. Jones, Jr. (Permanent) | June 2008 | February 2011 |
| Thomas G. Murphy (Acting) | February 2011 | October 2011 |
| Andrea Norris | October 2011 | December 2022 |

In January 2008, in an effort to foster efficiencies, the Office of the Chief Information Officer (OCIO) was established in the NIH Office of the Director. The functions of the CIO, formerly part of NIH Center for Information Technology (CIT), were transferred from CIT to the new OCIO. OCIO develops IT-related strategy, services, and policy to ensure that all NIH IT infrastructure is benchmarked against industry standards. CIT functions as the operating arm of the CIO, providing IT expertise for OCIO program activities and providing enterprise IT services and research and administrative support to all of NIH.

The CIT Office of the Director (OD) plans, directs, coordinates, and evaluates the Center's programs, policies, and procedures and provides analysis and guidance in the development of systems for the use of IT techniques and equipment in support of NIH programs. The OD includes the Executive Office (EO), which provides CIT administrative and business management services in support of CIT programs. The EO provides oversight of CIT's administrative policies and procedures; provides financial management, including development and oversight of the CIT budget; advises on human resources planning and management; and performs strategic planning, operational planning, and performance measurement.

=== Office of the Director (OD) ===
Ivor D'Souza, Acting Director, CIT; Xavier Soosai, CIO and Director, IT Services; Kevin Davis, Director of Office of Administration Management

=== Office of the IT Services Management ===
- CIO and Director of IT Services: Xavier Soosai, MS. MBA

The Office of CIO and IT Services Management directs service areas that provide NIH with a variety of IT services such as user support, identity and access management, high-performance computing, and network cabling. The service areas are: Business Application Services; Facilities and Infrastructure Support Services; High Performance Computing Services; Hosting and Storage Services; Identity and Access Management Services; IT Support Services; Network Services; Operations Management Services; Service Desk Services; and Unified Communication and Collaboration Services.

== See also ==
- National Institutes of Health
