= Hugh A. Carson =

Alabama politician

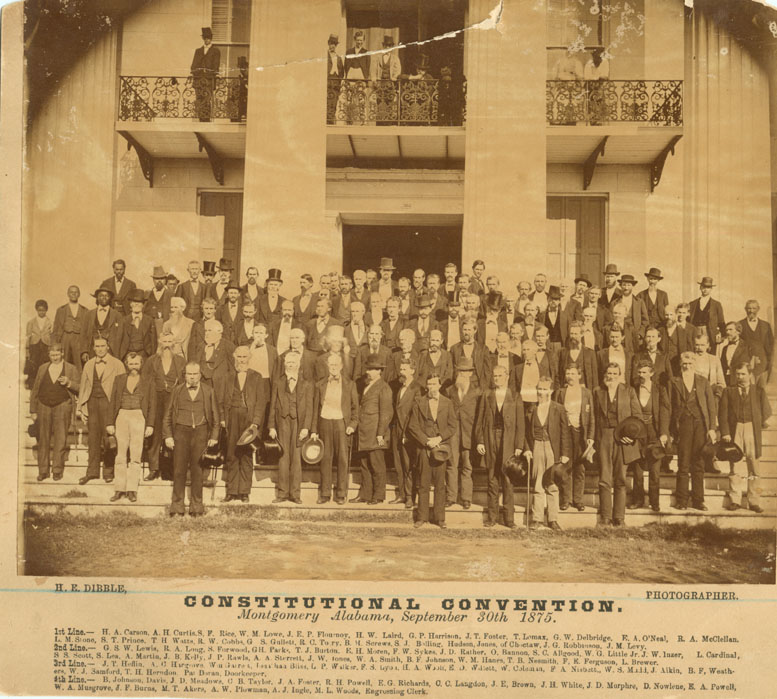
- Delegates at the 1875 Alabama Constitutional Convention. Carson and Alexander H. Curtis are standing top left
- Died: May 9, 1913
- Known for: delegate to Alabama's 1875 Constitutional Convention, member of the Alabama House of Representatives

Hugh A. Carson (died May 9, 1913) was a delegate to Alabama's 1875 Constitutional Convention and served as a state representative for two terms in Alabama during the Reconstruction era. He was a former slave.

Carson was a delegate to the 1875 Alabama Constitutional Convention and a member of the Alabama House of Representatives. He was classified as "Colored". Clerk of the Alabama House of Representatives Ellis Phelan reported on a petition to the Alabama legislature "praying for the expulsion" of state senator John W. Jones of Lowndes County and Carson.

Carson testified that he witnessed vote rigging in the 1882 election. He testified he lived in Hayneville, Alabama for almost a decade and was 38.

Carson belonged to the Dexter Avenue Baptist Church in Montgomery, Alabama. He lived at 326 Cleveland Avenue and served as Deputy United States collector. His brother William E. Carson served in the state house from 1872 until 1874 representing Lowndes County.

Carson was one of the last African Americans to serve in the Alabama state legislature in the 19th century. He was removed from office in 1878 and replaced with J. F. Haigler. He was buried at Lincoln Cemetery.
