= The Morning Star, Ruthin =

Pub in Denbighshire, Wales

The Star
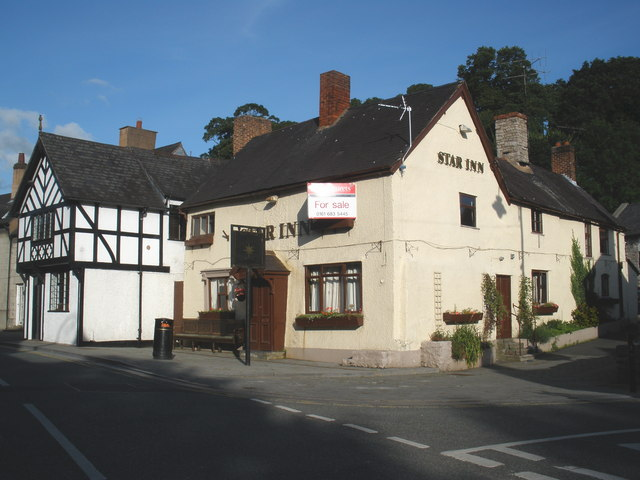
- The Morning Star, Ruthin; 2009
- Interactive map of the The Star area

General information
- Location: Ruthin, Denbighshire, Wales
- Coordinates: 53.113356°N 3.313581°W
- Construction started: 1639
- Completed: 1639

Technical details
- Structural system: Stone, wood and brick

Listed Building – Grade II
- Official name: The Star Inn
- Designated: 16 May 1978
- Reference no.: 858

The Morning Star (or The Star Inn), Ruthin, was listed as a Grade II building on 16 May 1978. It is directly opposite the Ruthin Gaol, and is claimed to be the oldest pub in Ruthin.

Early in 2010 a cache of old documents was discovered in the roof of the Morning Star. They were four very dirty, tightly screwed up bundles of papers giving detail on the business of an alehouse and on ordinary life in early Victorian Ruthin. They are about John Williams who was the last of five family members to hold the licence for the Star in the early nineteenth century.

The Star was originally built in 1639, as a lobby-entrance building with integral rear wing.

The inn was known as the "North Pole" in 1756 with James Edwards bricklayer as the licensee; it became the "Star" in 1775 with Richard Percival, also a bricklayer, as the licensee. Finally it was renamed the Morning Star in 2010. An 1845 description mentions that the public areas were at the front of the building, with a bar and a parlour either side of the lobby entrance. Behind these was a kitchen and a brewhouse and pantry to the rear. A cellar lay below the public areas. Upstairs, there were four bedrooms, above which were lofts intended for the Star's servants.

== Williams family ==
In 1799 William Williams became the licensee of the Star and began a family connection which was to last for 46 years, through three generations and five licenses. In 1837 Robert's brother, John took over as the licensee and it is with him and his business that the newly found documents are mainly concerned. One of John Williams' bar account books has survived. He offered small lines of credit to his regular customers to tide them over while they waited for payment from their own customers. The bar book contains 52 names of regulars captured for posterity, and it is a sobering thought that these transactions represent the only surviving evidence of any activity by these individuals.

== 1840s ==
In the 1840s the Star was part of a large hospitality sector of 51 different establishments. On Clwyd Street alone, the Star competed with 9 other taverns and 2 retailers of beer.

== Food and farming ==
Surviving black bills from the 18th century show that the Star offered breakfast, luncheon, dinner, supper, "sanviges" tea and coffee as well as "servants eating", which suggests an all-day food provision. Food would be served in the parlour, a comfortable room with tables and chairs and carpet.
