= Ruthin Gaol =

Municipal building in Denbighshire, Wales

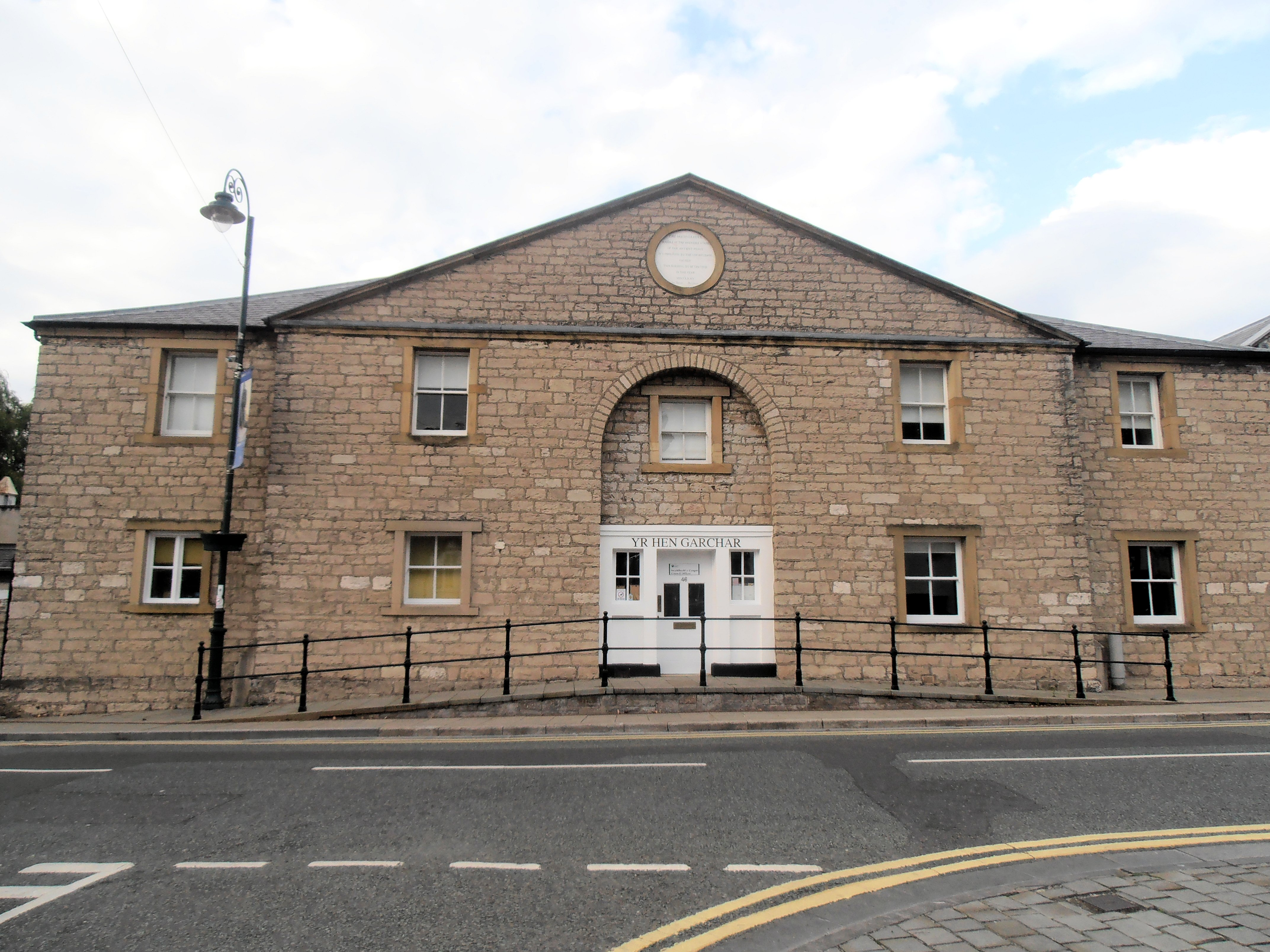
- Carchar Rhuthun, Ruthin
- Interactive map of the Ruthin Gaol area

General information
- Location: Ruthin, Denbighshire, Wales
- Coordinates: 53.116474°N 3.310352°W
- Construction started: 1654
- Completed: 1654

Technical details
- Structural system: stone

Website
- www.denbighshire.gov.uk/en/leisure-and-tourism/museums-and-historic-houses/ruthin-gaol.aspx

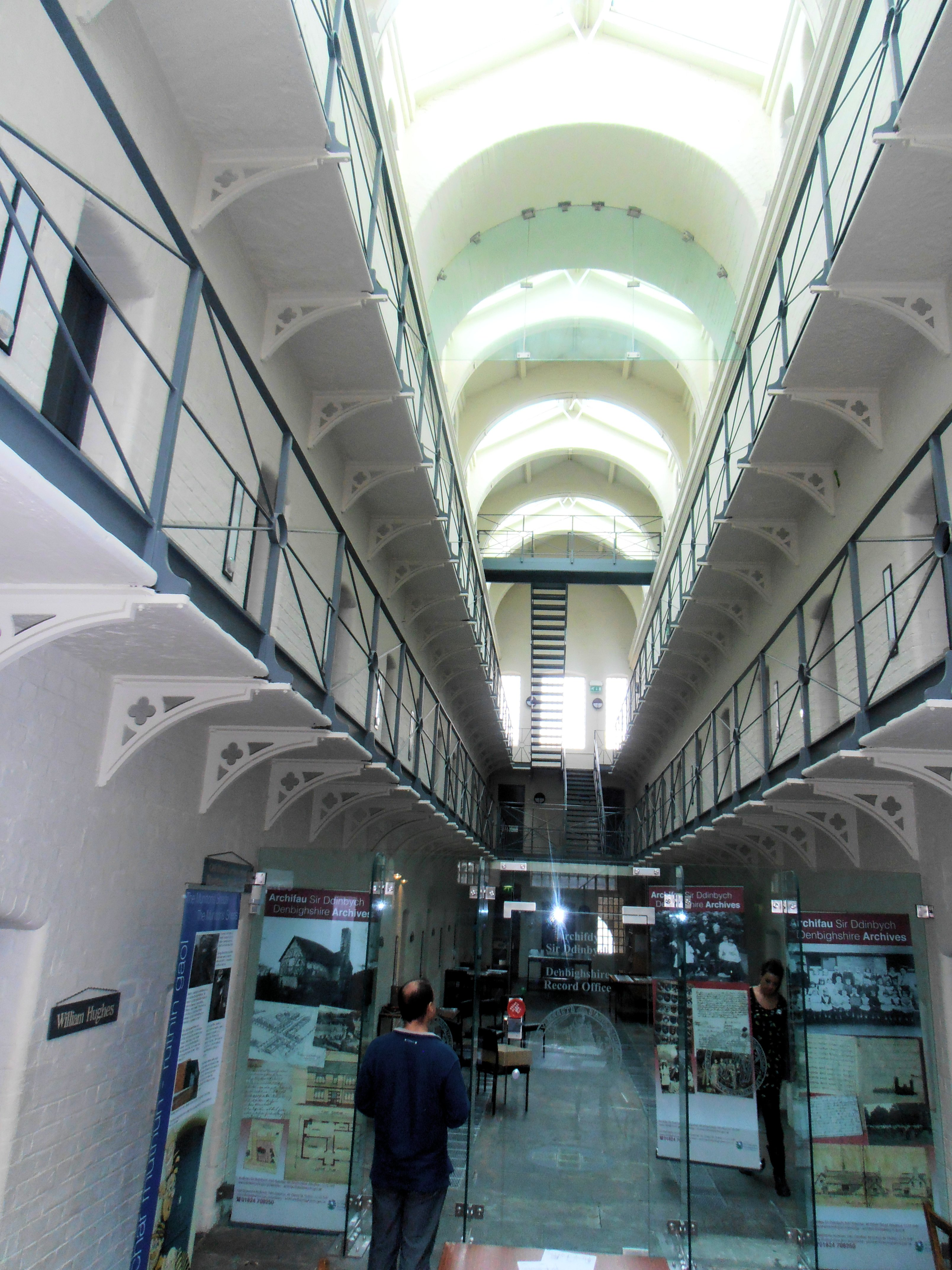
Main corridor

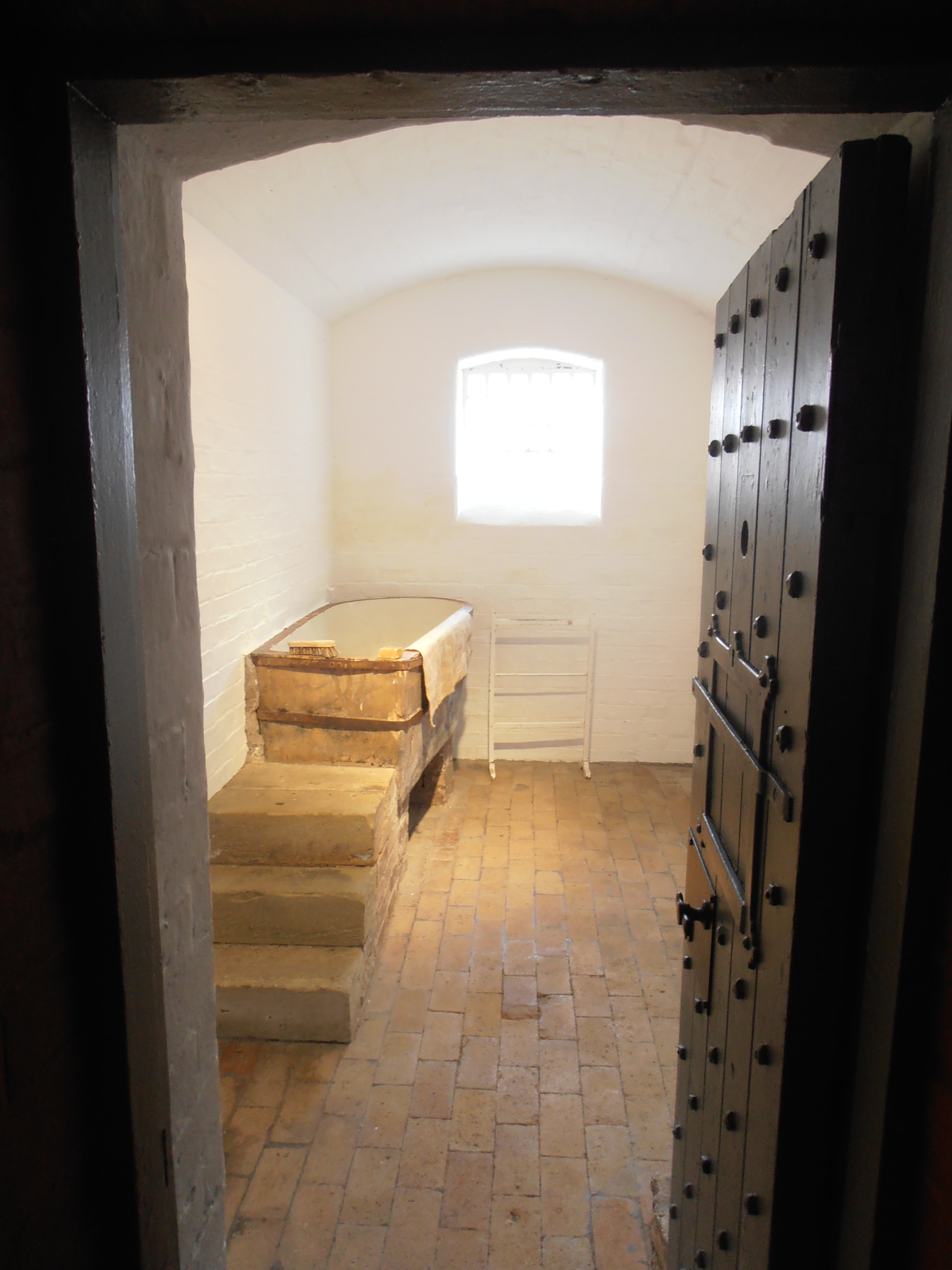
One of the cells

Ruthin Gaol (Welsh: Carchar Rhuthun) is a Pentonville style prison in Ruthin, Denbighshire. Ruthin Gaol ceased to be a prison in 1916 when the prisoners and guards were transferred to Shrewsbury Prison. The county council bought the buildings in 1926 and used part of them for offices, the county archives, and the town library. During the Second World War the prison buildings were used as a munitions factory, before being handed back to the county council, when it was the headquarters of the Denbighshire Library Service. In 2004 the gaol was extensively renovated and reopened as a museum.

== History ==
The first house of correction, or bridewell, was built at the bottom of Clwyd Street, next to the river, in 1654, to replace the Old Court House, where able-bodied idlers and the unemployed were sent to work. Following John Howard's investigations into prison conditions the Denbighshire justices resolved to build a new model prison in Ruthin on the site of the old Bridewell. Work began in January 1775. In 1802 the prison had four cells for prisoners and nine rooms for debtors. By 1837 it could hold 37 inmates. The Prison Act 1865 (28 & 29 Vict. c. 126) set new standards for the design of prisons—as the Ruthin County Gaol did not meet the standards plans were drawn up for a new four-storey wing, and the new prison accommodating up to 100 prisoners, in the style of London's Pentonville Prison was built at a cost of £12,000. On 1 April 1878 the Ruthin County Gaol became HM Prison Ruthin, covering the counties of Denbighshire, Flintshire, and Merionethshire.

As far as is known, only one person was ever executed in the prison, William Hughes of Denbigh, aged 42, who was hanged on 17 February 1903 for the murder of his wife, his plea of insanity having failed. Another colourful prison personality was John Jones, known as Coch Bach y Bala—who was a kleptomaniac and poacher who had spent more than half his 60 years in all the prisons of north Wales and many in England; he twice escaped from Ruthin Gaol, first on 30 November 1879 when he walked out of prison with three others while the staff were having supper—a £5 reward was offered for his capture, which happened the following 3 January. On 30 September 1913 he tunnelled out of his cell and using a rope made out of his bedding he climbed over the roof of the chapel and kitchen and got over the wall; after seven days living rough on the Nantclwyd Estate several miles away, Jones was shot in the leg by one of his pursuers, 19-year-old Reginald Jones-Bateman. Jones died of shock and blood loss, while Jones-Bateman was charged with manslaughter, though the charges were subsequently dropped.

Most Haunted: Midsummer Murders filmed the series' fifth episode in Ruthin in which the team investigated a Victorian-era murder. Some of the places the episode was filmed in were the Old Gaol and the town library. Netflix series The Irregulars filmed scenes in Ruthin Gaol in 2020.

== See also ==
- The Old Court House
- The Morning Star, Ruthin
