= Kilsby Jones =

James Rhys Jones (1813–1889), usually known as Kilsby Jones, was a Welsh nonconformist minister, writer and lecturer.

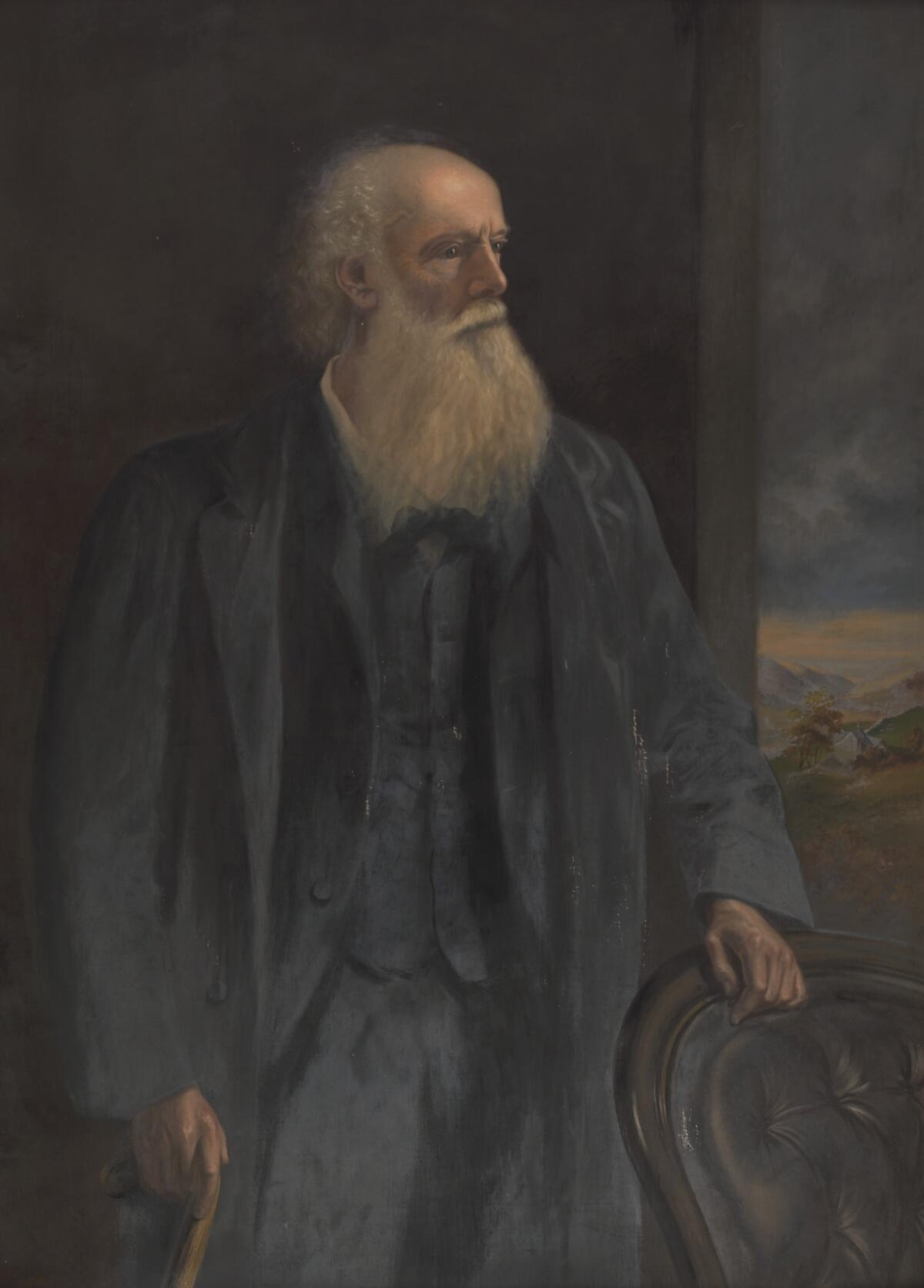
James Rhys Kilsby Jones, portrait by Ap Caledfryn

== Life ==
Born on 4 February 1813 at Penylan, near Llandovery, Carmarthenshire, he was the son of Rhys Jones, a small farmer and local preacher, and later independent minister at Ffald-y-brenin in the same county. He received his early education at Neuaddlwyd grammar school, at Rhydybont, Blackburn Academy, and at the Presbyterian College, Carmarthen.

Jones commenced his first pastorate at Leominster in 1834, during which time he met his future wife. Jones settled as minister of the independent church at Kilsby in Northamptonshire in January 1840, and was fully ordained there on 18 June of the same year. At this period he assumed the additional name "Kilsby". About 1850 he moved to Birmingham, and subsequently to Bolton. During his time in Bolton, he bought Gellifelen farm, near Llanwrtyd, Brecknockshire, his mother's birthplace, where he built a house called Glenview. initially, Glenview became a school for girls, run by a governess.

In 1857, he received a call to Rhayader, some fifteen miles from Llanwrtyd, where he came to live at Glenview. The railway did not reach Llanwrtyd until 1868 so Kilsby was obliged to walk back and forth in all weathers. After three years at Rhayader, he received a call to be pastor of the Tonbridge congregational chapel in London. However, his pastorate there was not a success, due to Kilsby's often unconventional behaviour and also some theological differences. He returned to Llanwrtyd, and passed the rest of his life at Glenview.

Jones resumed his pastorate at Rhayader but in 1868 he resigned to take up the pastorate of Caebach Chapel at Llandrindod Wells. (1868–1889). Almost immediately after commencing his pastorate, he instigated the building of Christ Church Chapel, at a cost of £1700. He remained at Llandrindod for the rest of his life but did no ordinary pastoral work. In addition the church was unconventional in that there were no deacons, no church meeting and no Sunday School. Llandrindod was a popular spa town in the late Victorian era and Kilsby's chapel was a popular destination among nonconformist visitors.

== Public lecturer ==
Kilsby established himself as one of the most popular exponents of the public lecture in the Welsh language. He usually lectured on religious figures such as Rhys Pritchard, Vicar of Llandovery and Daniel Rowland, the Methodist pioneer. These lectures were often associated with raising funds for chapel building. For example, Kilsby lectured on Rowland at Cwmavon in December 1869, with the funds going towards the building of a new chapel at Rock, Cwmavon, The "chief inhabitants" of the valley were reported to be present at the event.

== Political activity ==
Like many nineteenth century Welsh nonconformist ministers, Jones became involved politically with the Liberal Party. In 1863 he met Sir Thomas Lloyd at a Congregationalist meeting at Hawen Chapel, Rhydlewis, at a time when Lloyd was regarded as the future candidate for the Cardiganshire county seat. However, he was disappointed that Lloyd declined to oppose the sitting member, Colonel Powell of Nanteos, who in 1865 briefly reversed a decision to retire due to ill-health before withdrawing again a short time later. At the 1865 General Election, Kilsby was a prominent supporter of David Davies in his unsuccessful campaign in Cardiganshire, and he had close links with Aberystwyth radicals such as John Matthews and John Jones (Ivon). His polemical account of the Cardiganshire election in the Traethodydd was long regarded as a definitive account. In 1865 Kilsby Jones also actively campaigned for David Williams in Merioneth.

As well as his involvement in electoral contests, Kilsby was active in other political and social campaign. Chief among these was the development of education, and he was an early advocate of university education in Wales. For example, in December 1870 he joined with Thomas Price, John Griffiths (Gohebydd) and others in addressing a public meeting on the subject at Aberdare.

Jones also played a prominent role in Liberal politics in his native Breconshire, which was captured from the Conservatives by William Fuller-Maitland at an 1875 by-election, and became a safe Liberal seat thereafter. Kilsby Jones was actively involved in that campaign.

== Family ==
On 22 April 1842 Jones married Ann Southwall Chilcott of Leominster, who survived him. They had one son, Ryse Valentine Chilcott.

Kilsby Jones died on 10 April 1889, and was buried in the parish churchyard at Llanwrtyd, where a monument was placed over his grave by public subscription.

== Works ==
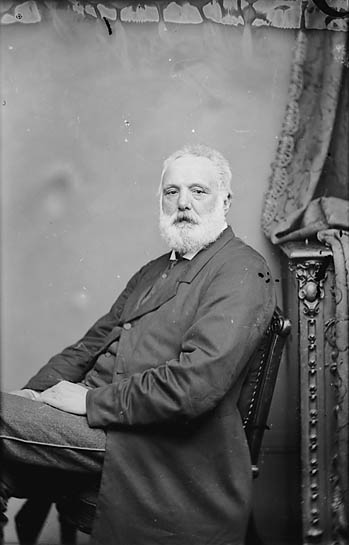
Revd James Rhys Kilsby Jones (1813-89) NLW3365076

Jones preached in Welsh or English, had a reputation as a lecturer, and employed a biting wit. His best-known subjects were "Vicar Prichard", John Penry, and "Self-made Men". He was a resolute enemy of the church establishment in Wales, and a Liberal.

Jones translated into English William Rees's Memoirs of the late W. Williams of Wern, London, 1846; and into Welsh The second Letter on the present Defective State of Education in Wales, by W. Williams, M.P. for Lambeth, with a sketch of the educational policy of the government, Llanelly, 1848, and John Brown's Biblical Dictionary as Geiriadur Beiblaidd, Glasgow, 1869–70. He edited:

- Holl Weithiau prydyddawl a rhyddieithol … W. Williams, o Bantycelyn (The Complete Works of Williams of Pantycelyn, with Memoir), Glasgow, 1868;
- a Welsh version of John Bunyan's Pilgrim's Progress and other works, Glasgow, 1869;
- a Welsh Family Bible (new edition of Peter William's Bible), Glasgow, 1869.

He published A Lecture on the Educational Wants of Wales, 1851; and "An Essay on the Characteristics of Welsh Preaching" was included in Echoes from the Welsh Hills, by the Rev. David Davies, London, 1883. Jones was also joint author with Dr. R. Richardson of Rhayadr of Breconshire and Radnorshire Mineral Springs, Llanidloes, 1860.

Jones contributed to Welsh periodicals, beginning while at Kilsby with articles on political, social, and educational questions in Y Traethodydd and Y Byd Cymreig. For many years he was Welsh editor to William Mackenzie of Glasgow.

== Sources ==
=== Books and journals ===
- Jones, Ieuan Gwynedd (1964). "Cardiganshire Politics in the Mid-Nineteenth Century" (PDF). Ceredigion. 5 (1): 14–41.
- Kilsby Jones, J.R. (October 1865). "Etholiadau Ceredigion a Meirionnydd" (PDF). Traethodydd (in Welsh). XX (4): 488–512.
- Morgan, J. Vyrnwy (1905). Morgan, J. Vyrnwy (ed.). Welsh Religious Leaders in the Victorian Era. London: Nisbet & Co.

Attribution This article incorporates text from a publication now in the public domain: Lee, Sidney, ed. (1892). "Jones, James Rhys". Dictionary of National Biography. Vol. 30. London: Smith, Elder & Co.
