= Alan S. Graeff =

Alan S. Graeff was named chief information officer (CIO) of the National Institutes of Health (NIH) and director of the newly formed Center for Information Technology (CIT) on March 6, 1998.

== Personal ==
As of early 2007, he lived in Bethesda, Maryland with his wife and children. He graduated from American University with a B.S. in distributed sciences.
