= John Jones (English cricketer) =

English cricketer

Personal information
- Full name: John Jones
- Born: 18 September 1858; Birmingham, Warwickshire, England
- Died: 18 September 1937 (aged 79); Chalfont St Giles, Buckinghamshire, England
- Batting: Right-handed
- Bowling: Right-arm medium

Career statistics
Competition	First-class
Matches	3
Runs scored	173
Batting average	43.25
100s/50s	1/0
Top score	125
Catches/stumpings	1/–
- Source: Cricinfo, 30 March 2019

John Jones (18 September 1858 – 18 September 1937) was an English first-class cricketer.

== Background ==
Jones was born at Birmingham. He died on his 79th birthday at Kingsfield Cottage, Chalfont St Giles, Buckinghamshire, although according to the Herts and Essex Observer, he died on 6 March 1937, aged 81 years.

== Cricket career ==
Jones made his debut in first-class cricket for the South in the North v South fixture at Lord's in 1884. He played again for the South in the 1885 fixture. In that same season he played a first-class match for the Players of the South against the Gentlemen of the South at The Oval, scoring a century in the Players first-innings when he made 125, in a 212-run partnership with William Tester, who made 108.

Jones later played minor counties cricket for Hertfordshire, appearing once in the 1896 Minor Counties Championship against Norfolk. Between 1889 and 1907 he played for Bishop's Stortford Cricket Club.
