= William U. Richardson =

American politician

William U. Richardson was a lawyer and member of the Louisiana House of Representatives. He represented Bienville from 1896 until 1900 and 1908 until 1912. He succeeded Rush Wimberly in office.

William U. Richardson co-authored an 1885 pamphlet 9n Bienville Parish. In 1902 he was Parish School Superintendent.
