= Paul Jonas =

Paul Jonas may refer to:

- Kevin Jonas (Paul Kevin Jonas II, born 1987), American musician
- Paul Ramirez Jonas (born 1965), artist and arts educator

== See also ==
- Paul Jones (disambiguation)
