= Andrea Norris =

American information technology executive

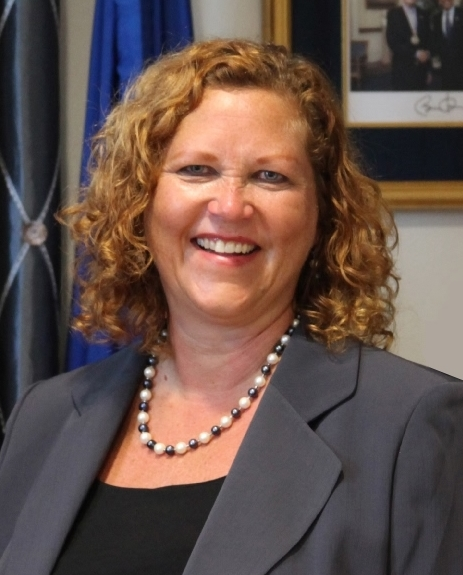
- Education: College of William & Mary; George Washington University
- Occupations: Information technology executive, civil servant
- Awards: Presidential Meritorious Service Award (2008, 2019)

Andrea T. Norris is an American information technology executive and former civil servant. She was the chief information officer of the National Institutes of Health and director of its Center for Information Technology from 2011 to 2022. Norris is a fellow of the National Academy of Public Administration.

== Life ==
Norris completed a B.A. in economics from College of William & Mary. She earned a M.B.A. with a major in information systems management from the George Washington University.

Norris was a management consultant at Booz Allen Hamilton and served on the Private Sector Commission on Cost Control. She joined NASA, working as the deputy chief information officer for management. Norris later worked for the National Science Foundation where she was responsible for establishing the agency's strategy, policies, and programs and managing its information technology systems and services.

She joined the senior executive service in 2001 and received the Presidential Meritorious Service Award in 2008 and 2019. In 2011, Norris joined the National Institutes of Health (NIH) as the chief information officer and serves as director of the Center for Information Technology. In 2020, Norris was inducted as a fellow of the National Academy of Public Administration. She retired from the NIH on December 31, 2022.
