= John P. Jones =

John P. Jones may refer to:

- John P. Jones (Nevada politician) (1829–1912), American politician
- John Paul Jones (1747–1792), Scottish-American naval captain
- John Paul Jones (Louisiana politician) (fl. 1912 to 1916)

== See also ==
- John Paul Jones (disambiguation)
