= Jon Jones (disambiguation) =

Jon Jones (born 1987) is an American mixed martial artist.

Jon Jones may refer to

- Jon Jones (director) (born 1967), British television director and screenwriter
- Jon Owen Jones (born 1954), Welsh politician
- Jon Jones (shot putter) (born 1991), American shot putter
- Thaon Jon Jones (born c. 1964), Jamaican sprinter, winner of the 1979 Austin Sealy Award

== See also ==
- Jonathan Jones (disambiguation)
- John Jones (disambiguation)
