= John Jones (16th-century physician) =

Welsh physician

- Occupation: Physician

John Jones (fl. 1579) was a Welsh physician.

== Biography ==
Jones was a native of Wales, is said to have studied at both Oxford and Cambridge universities, and Wood conjectured that he took one degree in physic at Cambridge, though no record of the fact can now be discovered (Cooper, Athenæ Cantabr. i. 419). It is not known when or at what place he commenced the practice of physic; but he mentions curing a person at Louth in 1562. He was residing at Asple Hall, near Nottingham, in May 1572, and at Kingsmead, near Derby, in January 1572–3. He also appears to have repaired, for the purposes of practice, to Bath and Buxton during the seasons at those places, and to have been patronised by Henry Herbert, second earl of Pembroke, and George Talbot, earl of Shrewsbury, K.G.

His works are:

- ‘Diall of Agues, wherein may be seene the diversitie of them, with their names, the definitions, simple and compound, proper and accidentall, divisions, causes, and signes,’ London, 1566, 8vo.
- ‘The Bathes of Bathes Ayde: Wonderfull and most excellent agaynst very many Sicknesses, approved by authoritie, confirmed by reason, and dayly tryed by experience, with the antiquitie, commoditie, property, knowledge, use, aphorismes, diet, medicine, and other thinges to be considered and observed,’ London, 1572, 4to.
- ‘The benefit of the auncient Bathes of Buckstones, which cureth most greevous Sicknesses, never before published,’ London, 1572, 4to.
- ‘Galens Bookes of Elementes,’ translated from the Latin, London, 1574, 4to.
- ‘A Briefe, excellent, and profitable Discourse, of the naturall beginning of all growing and liuing things, heate, generation, effects of the spirits, gouernment, vse, and abuse of Phisicke, preseruation, &c. … In the ende whereof is shewed the order and composition of a most heauenly Water, for the preseruation of Mans lyfe,’ London, 1574, 4to. The second, third, and fourth parts of this work are duplicates of Nos. 2, 3, and 4.
- ‘The Arte & Science of preserving Bodie & Soule in Healthe, Wisedome, and Catholike Religion … Right profitable for all persones: but chiefly for Princes, Rulers, Nobles, Bysshoppes, Preachers, Parents, and them of the Parliament house,’ London, 1579, 4to, dedicated to Queen Elizabeth.
