= Paul Jones (footballer, born 1976) =

English footballer

Personal information
- Full name: Paul Philip Jones
- Date of birth: 2 October 1976 (age 50)
- Place of birth: Birkenhead, England
- Position: Left-back

Youth career
- Wrexham

Senior career*
Years	Team	Apps	(Gls)
	Wrexham	6	(0)
- Bangor City
- * Club domestic league appearances and goals

Paul Philip Jones (born 2 October 1976) is an English former professional footballer who played as a left-back. He made appearances in the English Football League with Wrexham, and in the Welsh League with Bangor City.
