= Rush Wimberly =

American politician (1873–1943)

Joseph Rush Wimberly, I

Louisiana State Representative for Bienville Parish
- In office 1900–1908
- Preceded by: William U. Richardson
- Succeeded by: William U. Richardson

Louisiana State Senator for Bienville and Claiborne parishes
- In office 1908–1912
- Preceded by: J. C. Madden
- Succeeded by: John Paul Jones

Personal details
- Born: December 30, 1873 Arcadia, Bienville Parish; Louisiana, USA
- Died: March 11, 1943 (aged 69) Arcadia, Louisiana
- Resting place: Arcadia Cemetery
- Party: Democratic
- Spouse: Annie May Poland (married 1897-1943, his death)
- Children: Lorris M. Wimberly Edrie Wimberly Albrecht J. Rush Wimberly, II
- Parent(s): John L. and Francis Nix Wimberly
- Education: Arcadia High School
- Occupation: Attorney

Joseph Rush Wimberly, I (December 30, 1873 – March 11, 1943), was at the turn of the 20th century successively a member of both houses of the Louisiana State Legislature from Arcadia, the seat of Bienville Parish in North Louisiana. He served two terms in the Louisiana House of Representatives from 1900 to 1908. and a single term in the Louisiana State Senate from 1908 to 1912, representing Bienville and neighboring Claiborne parishes. Wimberly served on the Education committees of both houses during his 12-year tenure.

Wimberly was the youngest of eleven children of the former Francis Nix and John L. Wimberly, a planter and a native of Georgia who migrated westward to Louisiana in 1840. Rush Wimberly graduated from Arcadia High School, an entity of the Bienville Parish School Board. Having privately thereafter studied the law, he was admitted to the bar in 1894. After his legislative years, Wimberly moved to Shreveport in Caddo Parish in northwestern Louisiana, where he formed the law firm, Wimberly, Reeves and Dorman. He returned to Arcadia and for ten years was the parish attorney for Bienville Parish and for a number of years the parish public school superintendent.

Wimberly was an alternate delegate to the 1936 Democratic National Convention, which met in Philadelphia to renominate the Roosevelt-Garner ticket.

In 1897, Wimberly married the former Annie May Poland (1877–1960), and the couple had three children. The oldest, Lorris M. Wimberly, served in the state House, including several stints as Speaker. Lorris Wimberly was a political ally of his fellow Democrat, Governor Earl Kemp Long. The other Wimberly children were J. Rush Wimberly Jr. (1906–1982), an attorney, and Edrie W. Albrecht (1902–1983), the wife of Henry Gustave Albrecht (1899–1945) of Arcadia.

Wimberly and most of his family are interred at the Arcadia Cemetery.

Louisiana House of Representatives
Preceded by William U. Richardson	Louisiana State Representative for Bienville Parish; Joseph Rush Wimberly, I 1900–1908	Succeeded by William U. Richardson
Preceded by J. C. Madden	Louisiana State Senator for Bienville and Claiborne parishes Joseph Rush Wimberly, I 1908–1912	Succeeded by John Paul Jones (Louisiana politician)
