= John H. Jones and Carrie Otis Jones =

American pioneers and property developers

John H. Jones (c. 1834 – 1902) and Carolyn or Carrie Otis Jones (died 1909) were a pioneer husband and wife in Los Angeles, California, whose real estate holdings became worth millions of dollars by the beginning of the 20th century. John H. Jones was a member of the Los Angeles Common Council, the governing body of the city.

== John H. Jones ==
John H. Jones was born about 1834 in Chester, Massachusetts. He had a sister, later Mrs. F. J. Hall. In 1852 or 1854 he married Carolyn Otis.

In that same year he took ship around Cape Horn and debarked at the port of San Pedro, California, and made his way to Los Angeles "with a $20 gold piece and nothing else in the way of worldly possessions but the clothes on his back." He was hired by Don Abel Stearns to take care of horses and to be a general caretaker: His first job was to put together a collection of furniture that had come from the East.

John H. Jones died in his 258 East Adams Street home on February 12, 1903, at the age of sixty-nine, with a diagnosis of heart illness. A funeral service was held in the residence, with the Rev. Warren F. Day of the First Congregational Church officiating, and the body placed in a receiving vault at Rosedale Cemetery "to await the construction of a private vault."

=== Public service ===
John H. Jones was elected on December 3, 1877, to represent the 3rd Ward on the Los Angeles Common Council, serving one term until December 6, 1878.

He was a leader in forming the first volunteer fire department in Los Angeles, known as the Park Hose Company.

== Carrie Otis Jones ==
In 1852 or 1854 Carolyn Otis married John H. Jones in Boston, Massachusetts, and she joined him in Los Angeles in 1856, voyaging from the East by way of the Isthmus of Panama. She was said to be the "fourth woman of Anglo-Saxon lineage to settle in" the Pueblo of Los Angeles.

Carrie Jones was noted as a "philanthropist, church worker and California pioneer" who "managed her large holdings with rare judgment and acumen." She gave $20,000 to the Los Angeles YWCA for the construction of a building on Hill Street, she gave donations to build churches, and she "contributed generously for the establishment of the Barlow Sanitarium."

She died of "organic heart trouble" on October 19, 1909, in the family home, survived by a sister, Augusta J. Hubbard of Los Angeles, and a brother, N. L. Otis of Albany, New York. A funeral service was conducted in the home by the Reverend William Horace Day, followed by a cortege of thirty carriages that trailed a "bronze casket weighing nearly 1500 pounds, and banked with rare flowers" to the Evergreen Cemetery, Los Angeles.

== Estate ==
=== Under John H. Jones' management ===
About 1863 John H. Jones agreed to take three pieces of property in lieu of back pay owed to him by Abel Stearns. Two of them were at the corner of Fifth and Spring streets and the other was at Fifth and Main. There he built a corral and stable, an endeavor that became successful. It was from this corral that a posse started at midnight to capture the noted bandit Tiburcio Vasquez in 1874.

A profile in the Los Angeles Times printed in 1922 and based on interviews with old-timers said that: "John H. Jones prospered right from the start. It is said by his old associates that he was "always on the go" and that he attended strictly to business. Realizing his lack of proper schooling, he insisted upon correctness in his accounts. ... "

The Fifth and Main building was converted into a restaurant and was eventually replaced by a one-story brick structure housing a motion picture theater called Tally's and then was succeeded by the construction of the noted Rosslyn Hotel. The Jones property at 433 South Spring Street, once used as a stable for housing mules, was later the home for the Title Insurance and Trust Co.

John H. Jones, with partner George Pike, also owned the southeast corner of Fifth and Olive streets, where Hazard's Pavilion and later the Philharmonic Auditorium were built.

He had other extensive Downtown Los Angeles property holdings, and he also owned a ranch in Vernon, California.

Probate of John's will in 1904 determined that the estate was valued at $1,071,342.41 as community property with Carrie. Bequests were made to three nieces, Lizzie M. and Belle Jones and Laura Prentice and to a nephew, John L. Howes.

=== Under Carrie Jones' management ===
The Jones real estate holdings at Fifth and Spring streets were in a "practically unimproved condition" until after 1905, when it was announced that a syndicate composed of A. C. Bilicke, R. A. Rowan, Jared Sidney Torrance, the Adams-Phillips Company, Maurice S. Hellman, J. S. Satori and others, had leased the "magnificent property" in preparation to develop it with "ten-story fire proof structures of the most modern, and substantial character."

The will of Carrie Otis Jones was probated in October 1909. Her bequests from an estate of $4.5 million included:

- $4.3 million to her sisters, brothers, nieces and nephews, divided equally to Mrs. A. J. Hubbard, Los Angeles; Mrs. F. J. Hall, Pasadena; W. L. Otis, Hudson, New York; children of Mrs. Antoinette Moss, Thompsonville, Connecticut; children of Francis Otis, Albany, New York; and children of Edwin Otis, Chester, Massachusetts.
- $100,000 to the University of Southern California, for "scholarships for poor students."
- $50,000 to the Southwest Museum, "to preserve relics of California's early days."
- $10,000 to the Barlow Sanitarium, Los Angeles.
- $10,000 to found a library in Chester, Massachusetts, her birthplace.
- $10,000 to "Various local churches and missionary societies."

Income from the 50-year lease of the Security Building at Fifth and Spring streets was to be divided among the heirs.

=== Family home ===
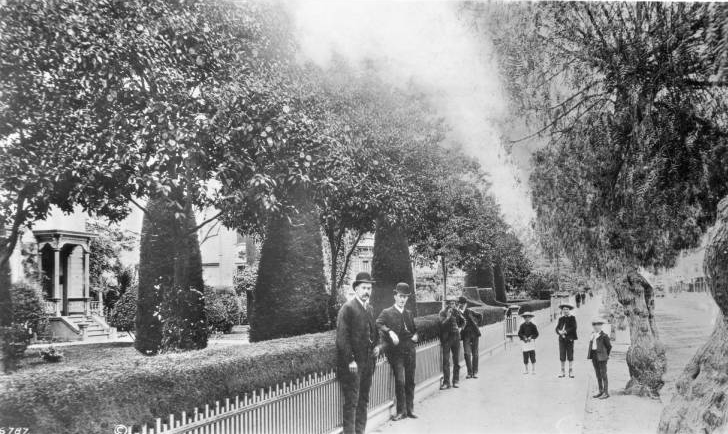
Front of the Jones residence on Main Street looking north from Fifth Street, Los Angeles, ca.1888

The family home was at Fifth and Main streets, described by a contemporary writer as follows:

About 1869 [John H.] Jones built a two-story wooden house on the site at Fifth and Main streets, which was a notable landmark for upward of forty years. This was the Jones homestead until about 1900, when a beautiful residence was erected at the corner of Adams Street and Maple Avenue. ... [The former building] eventually was turned into a cafe known as the Belmont, which was considered quite "the tony place" for Los Angeles epicures for a great many years.

The family's next house was at 258 East Adams Street in today's Historic South Central area, and in 1909 the Los Angeles Times said that "its beautiful gardens and architectural beauty ... mark it as one of the fine dwellings of the city." Carrie Otis Jones bequeathed this residence to nieces Elizabeth and Belle Jones of Beckett, Massachusetts.

== References and notes ==
Access to the Los Angeles Times links may require the use of a library card.
