= Jack Jones (footballer, born 1887) =

Australian rules footballer

Personal information
- Full name: Jack Jones
- Born: 20 July 1887
- Died: 19 May 1964 (aged 76)
- Height: 171 cm (5 ft 7 in)
- Weight: 72 kg (159 lb)

Playing career^{1}
Years	Club	Games (Goals)
1908–10	South Melbourne	15 (9)
- ^{1} Playing statistics correct to the end of 1910.

Jack Jones (20 July 1887 – 19 May 1964) was an Australian rules footballer who played with South Melbourne in the Victorian Football League (VFL).
