= Johnny Jones (boxer) =

Wales boxer

Personal information
- Nationality: British
- Weight: Flyweight

Boxing career

Boxing record
- Total fights: 14
- Wins: 8
- Win by KO: 4
- Losses: 6
- Draws: 0

Johnny Jones was a Welsh boxer who held the Welsh flyweight title in 1924. His village of residence was Pentre in the Rhondda.

== Boxing career ==
Little is known of Jones' early career, but his first recorded professional bout was against Charlie Morris on the 31 March 1921 in Liverpool. He won the match by technical knockout in the sixth. Jones then followed this result with another three knockout wins against inexperienced boxers, all in Liverpool. His fifth recorded professional fight was his first in London, and his first loss, this time losing the fight on points to the experienced Frankie Ash. Then on 12 October 1922, just five days after his fifteen round contest with Ash, Jones was back in Liverpool recording a points victory over Willie Woods. With this Jones had done enough to secure a return trip to London, where on 11 November he fought a re-match against Ash. The result remained the same with Ash this time beating Jones by a technical knockout in the thirteenth.

It was over a year until Jones is recorded as fighting again, a return to The Stadium in Liverpool in a win over local fighter Bert Mills. On 3 March 1924 he fought his first professional fight in Wales when he faced Tommy White at the Unity Hall in Barry. Jones won the fight by points over a ten round bout. His next three fights all ended in defeat, losing to Elky Clark and Jim Hanna on points and suffering a technical knockout to Young Johnny Brown.

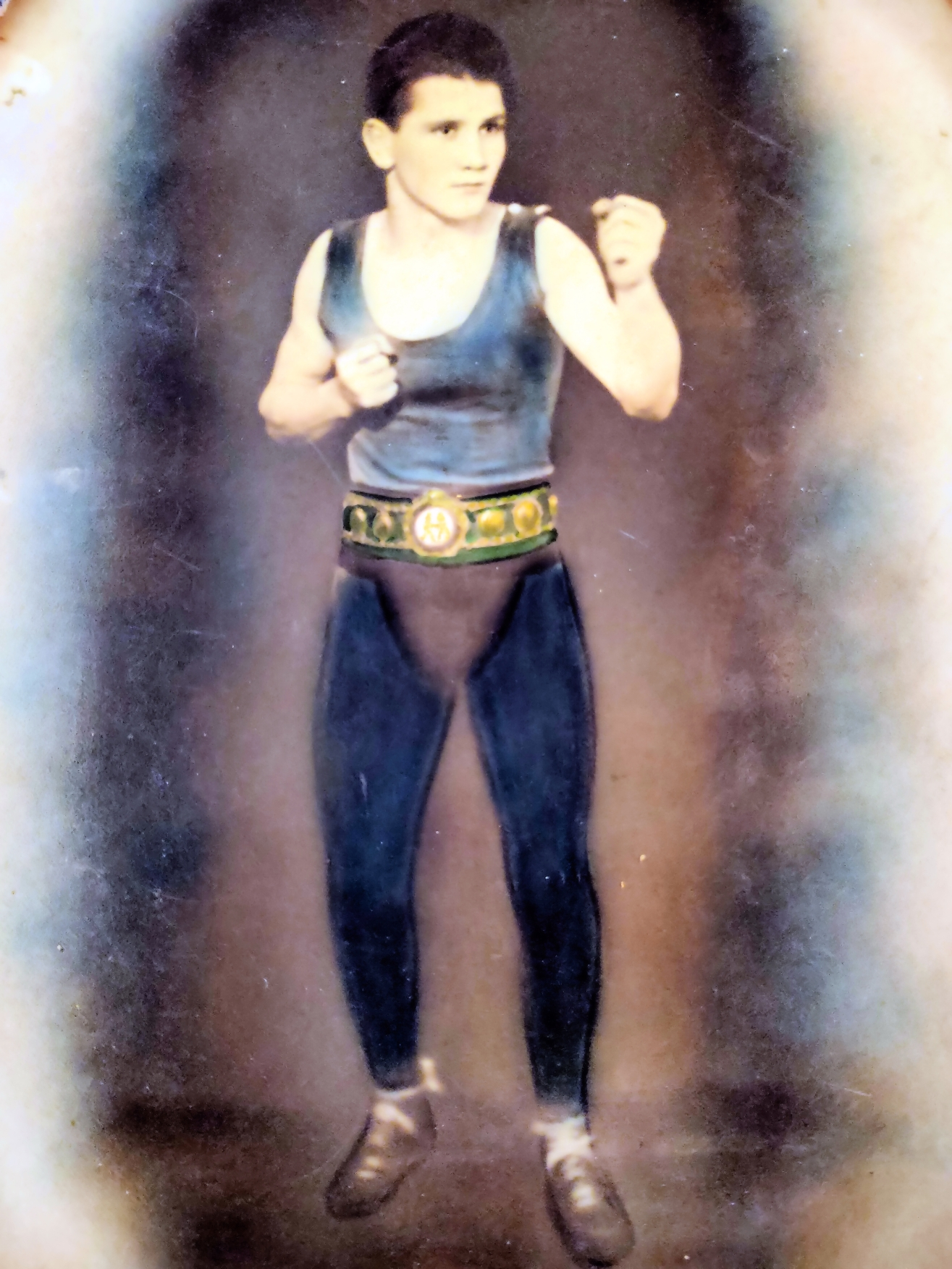
A family photo of Johnny when he was active.

On 20 December 1924 Jones fought for the Welsh Flyweight Championship just a mile from his hometown, in a contest in Treorchy against Gus Legge of Abertillery. The fight went the distance of 20 rounds and Jones won on a points decision. His last recorded fight was an eleventh round loss to George Kid Socks.
