= John Jones (Coch Bach y Bala) =

Welsh criminal

John Jones (1854–1913), known as Coch Bach y Bala, was a Welsh criminal. His nickname, Coch Bach y Bala, literally translates as 'Little Redhead of Bala'. He was known as 'The Little Welsh Terror’, ‘The Little Turpin’, and also 'the Welsh Houdini' for having escaped on more than one occasion from Ruthin Gaol.

A habitual criminal, Jones spent over half his life in prison from which he made repeated attempts (some successful) to escape.

His first successful escape was in 1879 when he escaped from Ruthin Gaol while on remand for stealing some watches. By some method he opened the door of his cell and walked out of the front door of the gaol while the staff were having their evening meal. He was recaptured three month later near Colwyn Bay.

In 1900 he attempted to escape from Caernarfon Gaol while awaiting transfer to Dartmoor prison. Barricading himself in his cell he began to tunnel out but was unsuccessful.

Following two lengthy sentences in Dartmoor for burglary, Jones returned to North Wales and within months on his release was convicted of yet another burglary. Held in Ruthin Gaol while awaiting transfer, this time to Stafford Gaol, he tunnelled through the cell wall and climbed over the prison walls using a rope made from bedclothes. Six days later while being tracked on land near Llanelidan, Denbighshire he was shot in the leg by Reginald Jones-Bateman and bled to death from the wound.

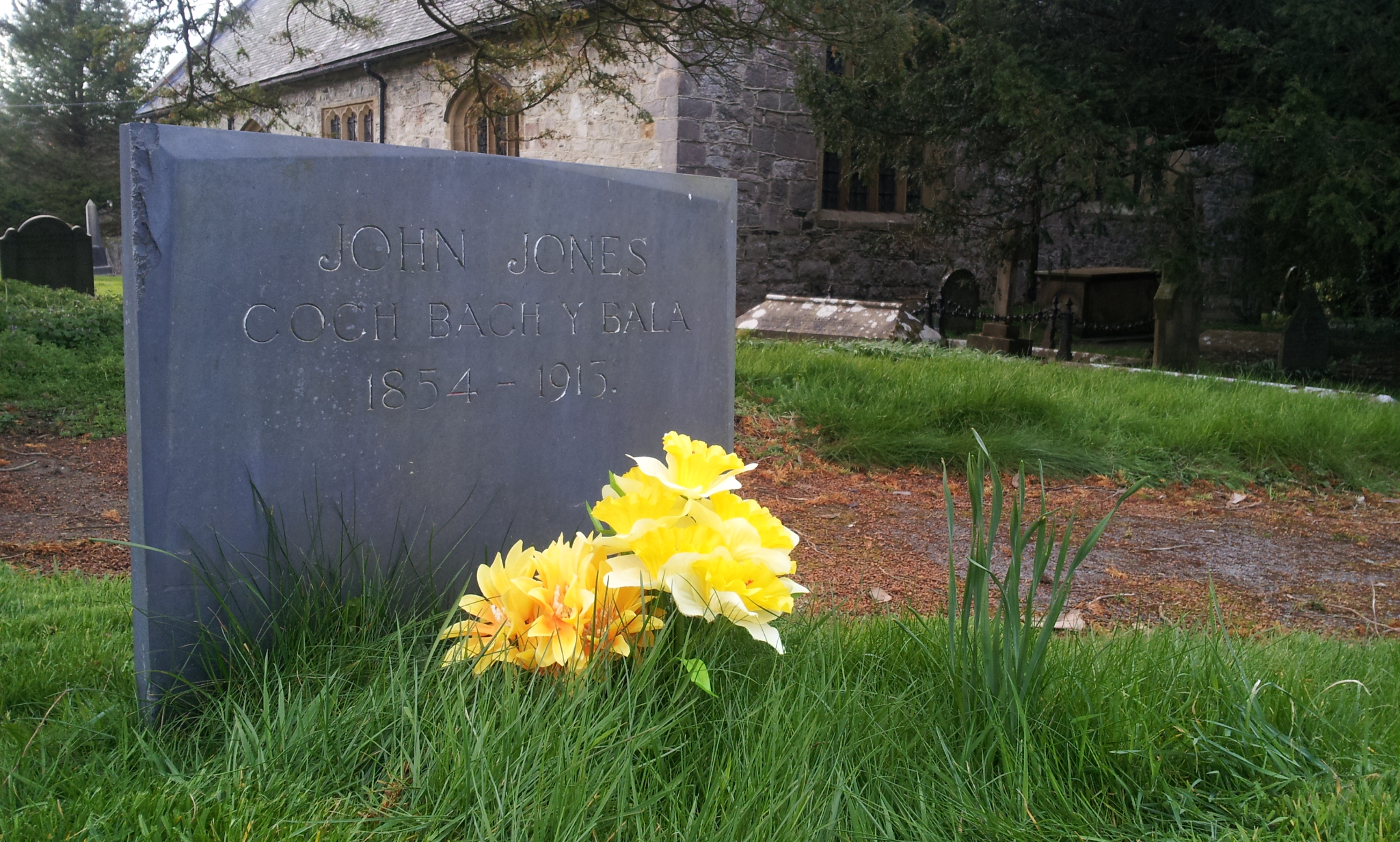
The grave of Coch Bach y Bala at St Elidan's Church, Llanelidan

He was buried in the graveyard of St Elidan's Church in Llanelidan.

Because of his exploits in escaping he was held in some regard by the local population and his funeral was well attended. His escapades were well reported in the press; describing his last escape the local paper wrote:

SENSATIONAL ESCAPE FROM RUTHIN PRISON
John Jones … effected his escape from Ruthin Prison on Tuesday morning, in a sensational manner, and at the time of writing is still at large. He gained his liberty as the result of indomitable pluck, great astuteness, and wonderful agility … ‘Coch Bach’ is regarded by some as a hero; his performance is certainly a daring piece of work. The escape took place between four and five o’clock in the morning, before the majority of the warders entered upon their duties… The daring manner of his escape, and the quickness with which he left behind him the precincts of the prison baffled the gaol authorities and the police.

— North Wales Times, 4 October 1913

In 2025, a play inspired by Jones, The Red Rogue of Bala, was produced at Theatr Clwyd, Mold. Written by Welsh playwright Chris Ashworth-Bennion, the play imagined Jones's final days.
