= Jonathan Jones =

Jonathan Jones may refer to:

== Sports ==
- Jonathan Jones (American football), American football player
- Jonathan Jones (baseball) (born 1989), American baseball player
- Jonathan Jones (Canadian football) (born 1997), Canadian football player
- Jonathan Jones (footballer), Welsh footballer for Chester City
- Jonathan Jones (runner) (born 1999), Barbadian middle-distance runner
- Jonathan C. Jones (born 1976), Barbadian-born Canadian thoroughbred horse-racing jockey
- Jonathan Jones (shot putter) (born 1991), American shot putter

== Others ==
- Jonathan Jones (artist), Indigenous Australian artist
- Jonathan Jones (civil servant) (born 1962), British government lawyer
- Jonathan Jones (journalist), British journalist and art critic
- Jonathan Jones (musician) (born 1982), lead vocalist and keyboardist of We Shot the Moon
- Jonathan Jones, British man convicted and then released on appeal for the murders of Harry and Megan Tooze
- Jonathan A. Jones (born 1967), British physicist
- Jonathan D. G. Jones (born 1954), British molecular biologist
- Jo Jones (Jonathan David Samuel Jones, 1911–1985), American jazz drummer

== See also ==
- Johnathon Jones (born 1988), American basketball player
- Jon Jones (disambiguation)
- John Jones (disambiguation)
