= William Tester (cricketer) =

English cricketer

William Abraham Tester (8 June 1857 – 9 June 1890) was an English cricketer active from 1878 to 1888 who played for Sussex. He was born and died in Brighton. He appeared in 104 first-class matches as a righthanded batsman who bowled roundarm right arm slow. He scored 2,675 runs with a highest score of 130 and took 154 wickets with a best performance of seven for 40.

He died in the Sussex County Hospital of injuries he had sustained when he threw himself from the upper storey of his house six weeks previously. He left a widow and five children, the fifth of whom was born the day before Tester died.
