= John Jones (physician, died 1709) =

John Jones (1644 or 1645 – 22 August 1709) was a Welsh cleric, inventor and physician.

== Life ==
Jones, whose family was from Pentyrch, Glamorgan, was educated at Jesus College, Oxford, where he matriculated on 28 June 1662. He obtained his Bachelor of Arts degree in 1666, with further degrees of Master of Arts in 1670, Bachelor of Civil Law in 1673 and Doctor of Civil Law in 1677. He was a Fellow of the college from 1667 to 1668. He became a licentiate of the Royal College of Physicians in 1677, obtaining a licence from Oxford University in the following year to practise medicine and working thereafter in Windsor, Berkshire. He was appointed chancellor of Llandaff Cathedral in 1686, but the then Bishop of Llandaff, William Beaw, disputed the appointment and Jones was not able to take up his position until 1691.

His works included a treatise, in Latin, on fevers (De febribus intermittentibus) (1683), and The Mysteries of Opium Revealed (1700), which was described by one commentator as "extraordinary and perfectly unintelligible". He also invented a clock which Robert Plot described as being "moved by the air, equally expressed out of bellows of a cylindrical form, falling into folds in its descent, much after the manner of paper lanterns."

After his death, on 22 August 1709, he was buried near the west door of Llandaff Cathedral.
