= Jack Jones (footballer, born 1888) =

Australian rules footballer

Personal information
- Full name: John Clark Jones
- Born: 5 March 1888; Lilydale, Victoria
- Died: 18 June 1960 (aged 72)
- Original team: Scotch College

Playing career^{1}
Years	Club	Games (Goals)
1908–09; 1913	University	40 (3)
- ^{1} Playing statistics correct to the end of 1913.

John Clark Jones (5 March 1888 – 18 June 1960) was an Australian rules footballer who played with University in the Victorian Football League (VFL). He played for University in 1908 and 1909 before moving to Western Australia to play for the North Fremantle Football Club. He returned to Victoria in 1913 and played one more season with University.

== Sources ==
- Holmesby, Russell & Main, Jim (2007). The Encyclopedia of AFL Footballers. 7th ed. Melbourne: Bas Publishing.
- Jack Jones's playing statistics from AFL Tables
