= John F. Jones Jr. =

American government official

John F. "Jack" Jones Jr. is currently the vice president and chief technology officer at WiseDesign. He previously served as chief information officer (CIO) of the National Institutes of Health (NIH), an agency of the U.S. Department of Health and Human Services. The NIH CIO advises the NIH director on strategic directions and management of information technology programs and policy. Jones also served as the director (acting) of the Center for Information Technology (CIT), at the NIH.

== Leadership positions ==
Jones joined WiseDesign in 2013 and has focused his efforts in developing new data modeling approaches.

He was appointed NIH CIO on June 22, 2008 and served till February 2011. He served as CIT director (acting) from 2005 till June 2008. His past appointments include NIH Chief IT Architect in 2001, when he joined the NIH; Deputy Director (Acting), CIT in 2003; and NIH CIO (Acting) in 2005.

Before coming to the NIH, Jones served as director of information processes at Sandia National Laboratories. During his last two years at Sandia, he also served as senior advisor to the Deputy Assistant Secretary at the U.S. Department of Energy for the Advanced Strategic Computing Initiative. In his former role as the chief IT architect, and as CIO and CIT director (acting) at NIH, Jones has focused on ensuring that information technology is matched to the business needs and processes that it supports. His efforts have brought together disparate communities, from physician-scientists to accountants and technologists. Results of this effort include the development of business process and conceptual data models for grants award and management, and the acceptance of business process modeling as a required part of application development.

== Education and military service ==
Jones attended Case Western Reserve University as an undergraduate and graduated first in his class. He continued his education at Stanford University and was awarded Master and Doctor of Philosophy degrees in Aeronautical Engineering. Jones's graduate education was interrupted by four years of service in the U.S. Navy, serving as a Naval Flight Officer. Jones's career focus moved from aviation to computing, and his work to develop and employ standards in computer-aided design and manufacturing was acknowledged with an award from the National Institute of Standards and Technology for being "the first commercial use of the Initial Graphics Exchange Specification."

== Sources ==
NIH Almanac - Organization - Office of the Director; this publication is not copyrighted and is in the public domain. URL: https://www.nih.gov/about-nih/nih-almanac/office-director-nih

Office of the Chief Information Officer. URL: https://web.archive.org/web/20100527085126/http://ocio.od.nih.gov/
