= Dred Wimberly =

State legislator in North Carolina

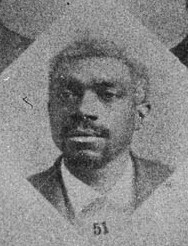
Wimberly c. 1889

Dred Wimberly (March 18, 1848 – June 16, 1937) was a state legislator in North Carolina. He served in the North Carolina House of Representatives in 1879 and 1887 and in the North Carolina Senate in 1889. He represented Edgecombe County.

== Early life ==
Dred Wimberly was born enslaved at James S. Battle's Walnut Plantation near Tarboro, North Carolina on March 18, 1848. He was one of 12 children of Allen Wimberly and Della Battle, both enslaved. Following emancipation in 1865, Kemp P. Battle, then the owner of the Walnut Planation, told his former slaves that they could either leave or stay and be hired as wage workers. Wimberly chose to remain and was given charge of the planation's supplies. He purchased goods on Battle's behalf and ferried goods between Battle's various farms and his home in Raleigh.

Wimberly married a woman, Kizziah, in 1869. The 1870 U.S. census them as living in a home in Tarboro. Later in the 1870s, he moved to Rocky Mount. He married another woman, Ella Jenkins, on February 11, 1891. He had 18 children, though only four outlived him.

== Political career ==
In about 1879, Wimberly was approached by members of the Republican Party to seek election to a seat in the North Carolina House of Representatives. He later said, "I got into it when I wasn't looking [...] I hesitated at first and asked them to look around a lot more. They nominated me anyhow and I was elected." He was elected to represent Edgecombe County and served from 1879 to 1880. Wimberly later claimed that during this term, with the urgings of Kemp Battle in mind, he had cast a decisive vote in favor of a large appropriation to fund the University of North Carolina at Chapel Hill during a close roll call vote. The Rocky Mount Herald described it as "his favorite story". Later commentators disputed the veracity of this telling, as substantial appropriations to the university were awarded in 1881, when Wimberly was out of office. Wimberly did support improvements to state roads and highways during his first legislative term.

Wimberly was again elected to the House and served in 1887. During that term he voted in favor of establishing the North Carolina College of Agriculture and Mechanical Arts. In 1889, he was elected to the North Carolina Senate.

After leaving office, Wimberly remained active in local Republican circles, serving as a magistrate in Edgecombe County in 1898. That year he sought the Republican nomination to the local Senate seat but was passed over. He attended the 1900 Republican National Convention in Philadelphia and voted to nominate William McKinley for the presidency. Afterwards, he moved to Washington D. C., and from 1900 to 1902 he served as a janitor for the U.S. House of Representatives.

== Later life ==
Following his work in Washington, Wimberly returned to his family in Rocky Mount. By 1930, he ran a grocery business. He died in Rocky Mount on June 16, 1937. and was buried at Unity Cemetery in the city. In 1966, a North Carolina Highway Historical Marker was erected outside his former Rocky Mount home to commemorate him. He was inducted into the Twin County Hall of Fame in 2005.

== See also ==
- African American officeholders from the end of the Civil War until before 1900
- List of first African-American U.S. state legislators

== Works cited ==
- Cheney, John L. Jr., ed. (1981). North Carolina Government, 1585-1979: A Narrative and Statistical History (revised ed.). Raleigh: North Carolina Secretary of State. OCLC 1290270510.
