= John Jones (geologist) =

John Jones (1835 – 6 June 1877) was an English geologist, and an official of associations and publications concerned with the iron trade in the north of England.

== Life ==
Jones was born in the neighbourhood of Wolverhampton in 1835. While young he began to study the rocks of his local district, and published a short treatise The Geology of South Staffordshire. He was secretary of the South Staffordshire Ironmasters' Association from an early age until 1866, when he was appointed secretary to the Cleveland Ironmasters' Association, and moved to Middlesbrough.

In his new position Jones took an active part in the formation of the board of arbitration and conciliation for the iron trade of the north of England. He acted on this board, as the representative of the employers, until his death. He was also secretary of the Middlesbrough Chamber of Commerce and of the British Iron Trade Association; shortly before his death he was appointed secretary to the Association of Agricultural Engineers.

He founded the Iron and Steel Institute in 1868, and he continued to act as secretary and editor of its journal until his death. Jones established a weekly iron exchange at Middlesbrough. He founded and edited two or three newspapers connected with the iron trade, notably the Iron and Coal Trades Review. He was elected an associate of the Institute of Mechanical Engineers in 1869, and became a full member in 1873.

Jones died at Saltburn-by-the-Sea on 6 June 1877, aged forty-two, after a long illness. He had invested in companies in iron industries of the north of England which failed, and died penniless; a fund was raised by the members of the Iron and Steel Institute for the benefit of his wife and children.

== Scientific papers ==
Jones wrote about twenty papers on scientific (mainly geological) subjects, the first of which, "On Rhynchonella acuta and its Varieties", appeared in The Geologist in 1858. At the Middlesbrough meeting of the Institute of Mechanical Engineers in 1871 Jones read a paper "The Geology of the Cleveland Iron District" (Proceedings of the Institute of Mechanical Engineers for 1871, page 184). His other papers are mainly contained in the Proceedings of the Cotteswold Club and in The Intellectual Observer.
