= East Louisiana State Hospital =

Psychiatric hospital in Louisiana, United States

Coordinates: 30.82899°N 91.20110°W

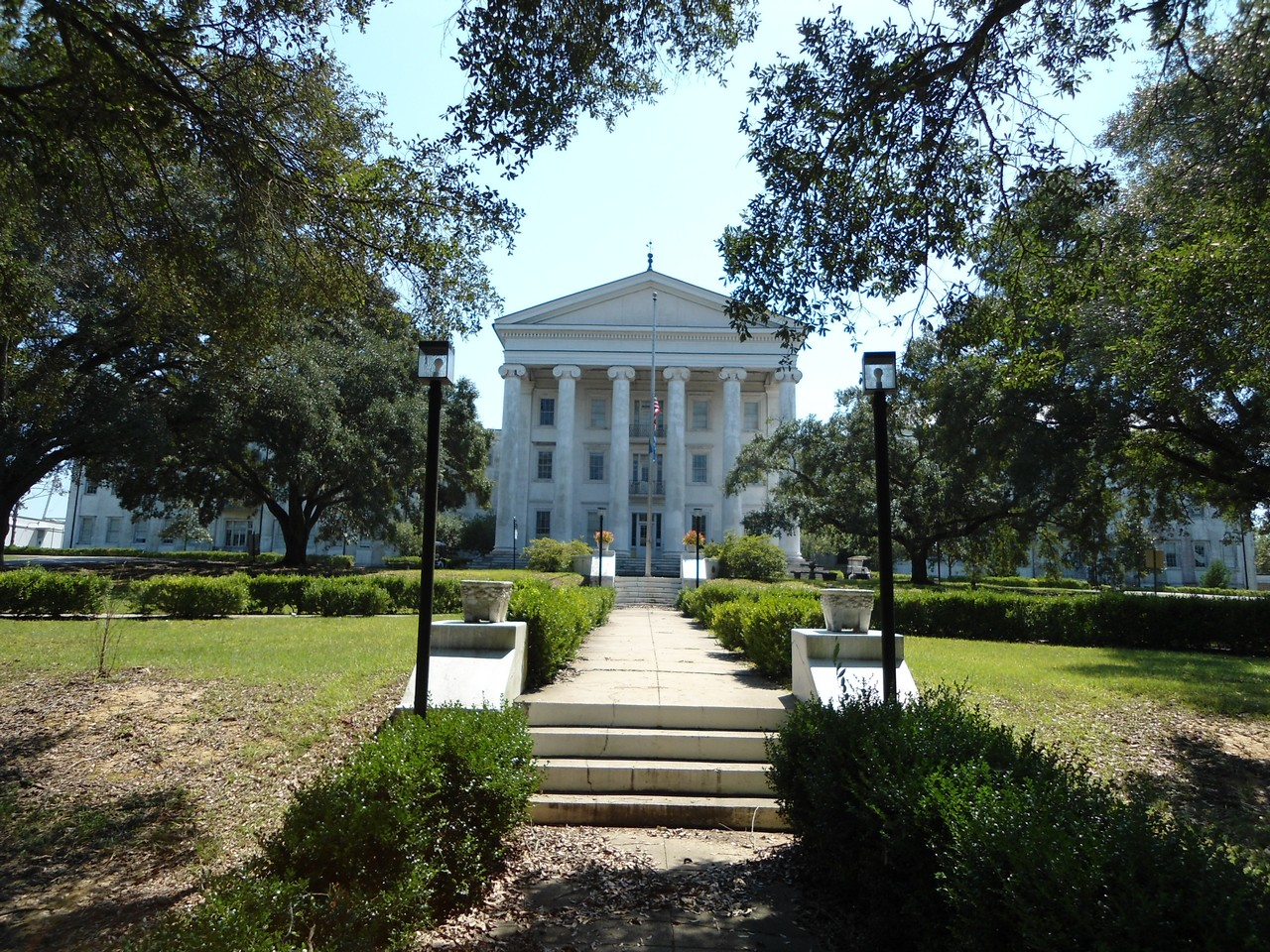
Center Building at East Louisiana State Hospital

The East Louisiana State Hospital is a state-operated mental hospital located on Louisiana Highway 10, a short distance east of the town of Jackson, Louisiana in East Feliciana Parish. The Center Building of East Louisiana State Hospital is listed on the National Register of Historic Places (National Register of Historic Places listings in East Feliciana Parish, Louisiana).

== History ==
The hospital was created by the Louisiana Legislature in 1847 and commenced operations in 1848. The hospital was originally known as the "State Insane Asylum." The location was chosen because Jackson is situated in an upland well-drained location that is relatively free of disease-bearing mosquitos, which plagued asylums in New Orleans. The main building, which was built between 1847 and 1854 is considered to be a particularly fine example of Greek revival architecture.

The United States Census for 1860 lists the names of 98 patients.

Dr. John Welch Jones, a resident of Jackson, was appointed as superintendent in 1874. Jones found the treasury had no funds, the patients had no clothes to wear, and lacked the necessities of life. Jones was forced to dip into his own pocket to provide operating funds for three months. He organized the strongest inmates as farm laborers and had them produce vegetables and field products for consumption in the asylum.

He purchased a brick making machine and had the inmates make bricks. Having produced 3,000,000 bricks of good quality, he was able to persuade the state legislature to appropriate funds for a new building. This was followed by four more buildings.

The capacity of the hospital was increased from 166 to more than 600. The hospital received 130 inmates from New Orleans in one day.

The New Orleans Civil Sheriff transported more than 80 patients to the Insane Asylum in 1895.

The hospital, then known as the East Louisiana Hospital for the Insane, did not participate in the early twentieth century eugenics movement, which called for the sterilization of persons considered to be mental defectives, however such persons were segregated.

Richard Avedon made a series of photographs, depicting the state of patients at the hospital in 1963.

The hospital campus contains a cemetery for patients who died at the asylum.

== The hospital today ==
Louisiana Department of Health and Hospitals operates the East Louisiana State Hospital, which provides "mental health evaluation, treatment, and rehabilitation services to adult citizens of Louisiana in a manner that will meet all legal and regulatory standards for patient care, accreditation, and licensing bodies." The hospital now includes a number of separate clusters of buildings known as "colonies". The hospital provides more than 500 psychiatric beds.

The hospital has a forensic unit where people who have committed crimes and been judged insane receive care.

It separately has other units where non-criminals receive care.
