= Jack Jones (1920s Welsh footballer) =

Welsh footballer

Personal information
- Place of birth: Hawarden, Flintshire, Wales
- Position: Inside forward

Senior career*
Years	Team	Apps	(Gls)
- Whitchurch
1922–1924	Wrexham	59	(13)
1924–1926	Crewe Alexandra	12	(3)
1925–1927	Sandbach Ramblers		
- * Club domestic league appearances and goals

John R. Jones (date of birth unknown) was a Welsh professional footballer who played as an inside forward. He made appearances in the English Football League for Wrexham and Crewe Alexandra.
