= John M. Jones (Pennsylvania politician) =

American politician (1796–1872)

Member of the Pennsylvania House of Representatives from the Montgomery County district
- In office 1834–1835

Personal details
- Born: June 14, 1796 Montgomery County, Pennsylvania, U.S.
- Died: June 12, 1872 (aged 75)
- Party: Democratic
- Spouses: Mary Heller (m. 1825; died 1838) Hannah M. Trasel (m. 1840)
- Children: 6
- Occupation: Politician; accountant; farmer

John M. Jones (June 14, 1796 – June 12, 1872) was an American politician from Pennsylvania. He served as a member of the Pennsylvania House of Representatives, representing Montgomery County from 1834 to 1835. In 1854, he was elected as register of wills of Montgomery County.

== Early life ==
John M. Jones was born on June 14, 1796, in Montgomery County, Pennsylvania, to Elizabeth (née Stevens) and George Jones. He attended local schools and was taught by Josiah Hoopes at the West Chester Academy.

== Career ==
Jones worked as an accountant in the counting room at a large importing firm in Philadelphia for one year. He then taught near Fort Washington and in Abington Township until 1844. He bought a farm in Abington Township and farmed there until 1854.

Jones was a Democrat. He served as a member of the Pennsylvania House of Representatives, representing Montgomery County from 1834 to 1835. In 1854, he was elected as register of wills of Montgomery County. In 1857, he was appointed as clerk of a court in Philadelphia by Judge Cadwallader. He served in that role until 1859 when he moved back to Montgomery County. He then moved to Tredyffrin Township in Chester County and bought a 128 acres (52 ha) farm.

In 1870, Jones was elected school director of Tredyffrin Township. He served in that role until his death.

== Personal life ==
Jones married Mary Heller, daughter of Daniel Heller, of Montgomery County on February 24, 1825. They had four children, Margaret, Hannah, Elizabeth and Franklin. His wife died in 1838. On May 21, 1840, he married Hannah M. (née Stadleman) Trasel. They had two children, Mary and Samuel. His son Franklin was a farmer and school director in Chester County. He was a member and deacon of the German Reformed Church.

Jones died on June 12, 1872.
