= John Jones (Ivon) =

Welsh radical (1820–1898)

John Jones, often known as Ivon (10 May 1820 - 6 September 1898) was a Welsh radical and man of letters, who played a prominent role in the political life of Cardiganshire and beyond in the late nineteenth century. He was a close acquaintance of the radical preacher Kilsby Jones.

Jones was born in the Mynydd-bach area in upland Cardiganshire, received little formal education. He became a grocer and relatively prosperous tradesman in Aberystwyth where he lived from 1835 until his death.

He actively participated in the religious and literary life of Aberystwyth, before it became a university town. He was the secretary of the National Eisteddfod held at Aberystwyth in 1865, and received a gold medal for his services. He was an active Calvinistic Methodist. In later years, he published material on history and folklore.

In 1865, Ivon was a prominent supporter of David Davies in his unsuccessful campaign in the Cardiganshire constituency.

Ivon died on 6 September 1898 and was buried at Aberystwyth.

== Sources ==
=== Books and journals ===
- Jones, Ieuan Gwynedd (1964). "Cardiganshire Politics in the Mid-Nineteenth Century" (PDF). Ceredigion. 5 (1): 14–41.
