= John Walter Jones (Wales) =

Welsh civil servant (1946–2020)

- Born: 28 March 1946; Moelfre, Anglesey, Wales
- Died: 24 September 2020 (aged 74); Cardiff
- Citizenship: British
- Occupations: Language activist, civil servant, radio presenter

John Walter Jones (28 March 1946 – 24 September 2020) was a civil servant and the first Chief Executive of the Welsh Language Board, a post which he held between 1993 and 2004.

== Early life and education ==
John Walter Jones was born in Moelfre, Anglesey, and educated at Friars School, Bangor. He studied Economics at University of Wales Institute, Cardiff.

== Career ==
He worked as a civil servant between 1971 and 1988, in the Welsh Office in Cardiff and London, where he was a private secretary to three Welsh Office Ministers.

In 1981 John was responsible for setting up the Government's first grants regime in support of the Welsh Language and in 1988 he was seconded to establish the non-statutory Welsh Language Board. He became the first Chief Executive of the statutory Welsh Language Board in 1993, and helped draft the Welsh Language Act which put Welsh on an equal footing with the English language in Wales.

Jones retired from the Welsh Language Board in 2004, and that year he was ordained to the Order of the Bards at the National Eisteddfod in Newport. He also received an OBE for services to the Welsh language in the same year.

In April 2006, he was appointed Chairman of Welsh-language television channel S4C. He retired early in December 2010 in controversial circumstances as he had intended to remain in his post until Spring 2011.

Between 2014 and 2018, he presented a lunchtime discussion show on BBC Radio Cymru.

On 24 September 2020, it was announced that Jones had died, aged 74.

== Personal life ==
He was married to Gaynor. They had one daughter, Beca, who died aged 32 in 2010. In the 2018 National Eisteddfod held in Cardiff, the financial prize awarded with the Chair was donated by Jones and his wife in memory of their daughter.
