= John W. Jones (Alabama politician) =

American politician

John W. Jones was a state legislator in Alabama. He served in the Senate in the 1872 and 1874 legislatures.

Jones was from North Carolina. He served in the Alabama Senate representing Lowndes County. Clerk of the Alabama House of Representatives Ellis Phelan, reported on a petition to the Alabama legislature " praying for the expulsion" of Jones and state representative H. A. Carson.

He was awarded a contract as a mail carrier in 1875.

In 1881, he was involved in a contested election with Charles M. Shelley for a vacated U.S. House seat in the 47th United States Congress.
