= John Jones (Benedictine) =

Welsh Benedictine monk

- Born: 1575
- Died: 17 December 1636 (aged 60–61); London
- Occupation: Benedictine monk

John Jones, also known as Leander à Sancto Martino, (1575 – 17 December 1636) was a Welsh Benedictine monk.

== Biography ==
Jones was born in 1575. He belonged to a family settled at Llan Wrinach, Brecknockshire, and was connected with the Scudamore family of Kentchurch, Herefordshire. Ralph Weldon asserts that Jones was removed from Wales to England when scarcely a year old (Chronicle of the Benedictine Monke, p. 100). His parents. who were Protestants, sent him to Merchant Taylors' School, London, in 1584, and there he studied with Lancelot Andrewes and William Juxon, afterwards bishop of London, On 15 October 1591 he was elected a scholar of St John's College, Oxford, where he was chamber-fellow with William Laud. He obtained a fellowship in his college, and was admitted to the degree of B.C.L. on 16 July 1600. 'His mind being much inclined to the Roman religion,' he quit the university, and within a few days of his arrival in London his parents died of the plague. Thereupon Jones left England for Spain, was received into the English Collage at Valladolid, then under the direction of the jesuits, 20 December 1596, and took the college oath on the feast of St. Alban, 1597. In October 1599 he was admitted into the Benedictine abbey of St. Martin at Compostella, and became a monk of that order, taking, in religion, the name of Leander à Sancto Martino. He passed brilliantly through his theological studies in the university of Salamanca, was ordained priest, and, after graduating D.D., continued his studies for about six years in Spanish monasteries.

Although ordered to the English mission, Jones acted successively as novice-master at the abbey of St. Remigiua at Rhelms, and at St. Gregory's at Douay. He was also for nearly twenty-five years professor of theology, and taught Hebrew in the college of Marchiennes, or in that of St. Vedast, in the university of Douay. In 1612 he became vicar-general of the Anglo-Spanish Benedictines. When in 1619 the present English Benedictine congregation was formally approved by Pope Paul V, Jones was elected its first president-general for the usual triennial period, and wua re-elected in 1633. According to decrees of the general chapter of the Benedictine congregation, he acted as prior of St. Gregory's at Douay from 1621 to 1628, and from 1629 to 1633. In 1629 he was appointed abbot of Cisniar, and in 1633 received the titular dignity of cathedral prior of Canterbury.

Jones frequently visited England, and enjoyed special protection through the agency of his friends at court. When early in 1634 Urban VIII determined to send an accredited agent to England to open diplomatic relations towards obtaining religious toleration for Catholics in the British Isles he chose Jones for the important mission. Jones displayed a general spirit of good sense and moderation, and took an oath of allegiance on 17 December 1634, appending to it a declaration that the pope had no dispensing power in regard to the oath (Clarendon State Papers, 1. 210). In letters addressed by him to Cardinal Barberini, he sought to refute charges of minimising the Pope's pretensions and the claims of the Catholics. The negotiations led to no practical result. But Francis Harris, a secular priest who had conformed to Anglicanism, deposed in 1643, before the lords' committee appointed to take the examinations in the case of Archbishop William Laud, that Father Leander, 'by the common report of papists and priests, both abroad and in England, was very familiar with the said archbishop, and came over on purpose into England ... to negotiate with the said archbishop about matters of religion, to make a reconciliation between the church of Rome and England' (Prynne, Canterburie's Doome, pp. 411, 412). Laud denied the truth of this accusation.

Jones died in London on 17 December (O.S.) 1636, and was buried in the chapel of the Capuchin friars in Somerset House. Wood describes him as 'the ornament of the English Benedictines in his time,' adding that 'he was a person of extraordinary eloquence generally knowing in all arts and sciences, beloved of all that knew him and his worth, and hated by none but by the puritans and jesuits (Athenæ Oxon. ed. Bliss, ii. 604).

The following works were written or edited by him :

- ' Biblia Sacra cum glossa ordinaria, ordinaria, primum quidem a Strabo Fuldensi . . . nunc vero novis Patrum cum Græcorum tum Latinorum explicationibus locupletata, postilla Nicolai Lyrani . . . nec non additionibus Pauli Burgensis episcopi et M. Thoringi replicis, opera et studio theologor. Duacensium diligentissime emendatis,’ 6 vols., Douay, Antwerp, 1617, fol. In this he was assisted by John Gallemart.
- 'Historia et Harmonia Conciliorum, Frankfort,' 1618, fol.
- 'R. P. D. Gregorii Sayri Angli, monachi Benedictini ex Sacra Congregatione Casinensi, alias S. Justinæ de Padua, Opera Theologica,' edited by Jones 4 vols, Douay, l 620, fol. [see Sayer, Robert, alias Gregory]
- 'Rosetum Exercitiorum Spiritualium, et Sacrarum Meditationum, auctore Mauburno Bruxellense, . . . Edidit et castigavit L. de S. Martino, 'Douay, 1620, fol.
- 'Otium theologicum tripartitum; sive amœnissimæ disputationes de Deo, intelligentiis animabus separatis, earumque variis receptaculis, trium magnorum authorum, Bartholomæi Sybillæ, Joannis Trithemii, Alphonsi Tostati,' 3 parts, Douay, 1621 8vo.
- 'Sacra Ars Memoriæ, ad Scripturas Divinas in promptu habendas, memoriterque ediscendas, accommodata,' Douay, 1623, 8vo at the end of which is
- 'Conciliatio locorum specietenus pugnantium totius S. Scripturæ; auctore Seraphino Cumirano; R. P. Leander a S. Martino explicavit et illustravit,'Douay, 1623, 8vo.
- 'Bibliotheca seu speculum mundi Vincentii Bellovacensis; edidit R. P. Leander,' 4 vols. [Douay?], 1624, fol.
- The third tractate in the ‘Apostolatus Benedictinorum in Anglia,’ published under the name of Clement Reyner, D.D., Douay, 1626, fol.; the materials were collected with Jones's assistance by Father David Baker [q.v.]; the whole was translated into elegant Latin by Jones, and Reyner saw it through the press.
- 'A Threefold Mirror of Man's Vanity and Miserie: the first written by ... John Trithemius ... Abbot of Spanhem,’ Douay, 1633, 12mo. Father Gilbert Dolan says this was probably edited by Jones (Downside Review, vi. 134).
- 'Arnobii disputationum adversus Gentes libri septem; cui accesserunt paratitla … quibus elucidatur authoris obscuri methodus, qua in disputando utitur, et cautiones aliquot de erroribus ejus. Authore L. de S Martino,' Douay, 1634, 8vo.
- ‘The Spirit of St. Bennet's Rule, or a rule of Benedictine perfection,' manuscript in the Lille archives. Canon Francis Cuthbert Doyle published 'The Rule of St. Benedict. From the old English edition of 1638.' From the Latin by Leander de Sancto Martino and John Fursdon [q.v.], London, 1875, 8vo.
- ‘Opera Ludovici Blosii,’ edited by Jones.
- Letters to Urban VIII, Cardinal Barberini, Secretary Windebank, and others, concerning the affairs of the English Catholics. Printed in Lord Clarendon's ‘State Papers,’ 3 vols., 1767, or summarised in the ‘Calendar of the Clarendon State Papers,’ Oxford, 1872, vol. i. ed. Ogle and Bliss.

It has been erroneously stated that Jones was one of the editors of the works of Rabanus.
