= John W. Jones (artist) =

John W. Jones (born 1950) is an American artist who first gained acclaim for his series "Confederate Currency: The Color of Money."

Self-taught and drafted into the U.S. Army in 1970, he served in Vietnam, eventually becoming an Army illustrator. Examining Confederate banknotes, he became interested in the depiction of the slave economy in the American South before and during the American Civil War. Banknotes of the era often depicted slaves as happy workers on the cotton plantations. Jones has said he intends to demonstrate that banknotes served a propaganda purpose in depicting slavery as a natural state of affairs and one on which the Southern states' economies rested.

Jones recreated these scenes in large color paintings, using models and posing them as in the original etched images. He exhibits his paintings next to the banknote with the original etching.

More recently, he has created a series of paintings, "Lowcountry Gullah Series." He also painted a series featuring the 54th Massachusetts Volunteer Infantry, a regiment of Black soldiers that fought for the Union Army during the American Civil War.
