= John Welch Jones =

Physician (1826–1916)

- Born: 1826; Lancaster County, South Carolina
- Died: 1916 (aged 89–90)
- Education: Tulane University School of Medicine
- Occupation: Physician

John Welch Jones (1826–1916) was a medical doctor, Civil War cavalry officer, superintendent of the Insane Asylum of Louisiana, and planter. Jones led the reform of the care of mentally ill people in late nineteenth century Louisiana.

== Early life ==
John Welch Jones was born in Lancaster County, South Carolina (now Kershaw County) on October 17, 1826, to William Welch Jones and Edith Hilton. He was the fourth born of eight children. Jones' father, William Welch Jones (1799–1871), born in Lancaster County, was the son of Samuel Jones, who fought with General Francis Marion ("The Swamp Fox") in the Revolutionary War. The Jones family has been traced back to a William Jones, an immigrant from Wales, who settled near Roanoke, Virginia but removed to South Carolina.

Jones' mother, Edith Hilton (1800–1871), born in Lancaster County, was the daughter of Samuel Hilton, a member of a prominent South Carolina family, who also served with General Marion.

William Welch Jones moved his family to Opelika, Alabama in 1832. He either remained in Alabama, coming to Louisiana only near the end of his life, or moved his family to Feliciana Parish, Louisiana in 1832 and became a substantial planter. (Sources differ) Whatever the case, William and Edith Hilton Jones resided at Jackson, Louisiana near the end of their lives in 1871.

== Mexican–American war ==
John Welch Jones enlisted in military service for the Mexican–American War (1846–1848).

== Medical practice ==
Jones came to Louisiana in 1848 and enrolled at Tulane University School of Medicine in New Orleans, from which he graduated in 1852. Jones entered medical practice at Jackson, Louisiana, which proved to be lucrative. Young Doctor Jones was soon faced with epidemics of yellow fever in 1853, 1855, and 1857.

== Civil War service ==
At the outbreak of the Civil War, Jones organized 115 men at Buehler's Plains (an unincorporated community in northern East Baton Rouge Parish, Louisiana, which was founded by German immigrant John Christian Buehler and located 11 miles south of Jackson, Louisiana.) into a cavalry unit called the Plains Guards, which he led as captain. The Plains Guards participated in the Battle of Baton Rouge.

In 1865, Captain Jones was traveling on a steamboat in the Tombigbee River, when the boiler exploded. He was the only survivor of the accident, but suffered serious injury, including damage to his eyesight.

== Post Civil War medical practice ==
The end of the Civil War found Jones in poor health with impaired vision and reduced financial condition. Jones's impaired vision left him unable to practice medicine; however, he was able to engage in the retail drug trade at Jackson. It was not until 1869 that he was able to resume the practice of medicine, in which he engaged until 1874.

== Superintendent of the Insane Asylum ==
In 1874, Jones was appointed to the position of Superintendent of the Louisiana State Insane Asylum, founded in 1847, (now the East Louisiana State Hospital), which was located near Jackson . In that poverty-stricken, post-civil war time of reconstruction, he found the institution to be in terrible condition. The inmates had no clothes to wear and little food. Jones had to provide funds out of his own pocket.

He organized the stronger inmates into farm workers and had them start gardens to provide food for the hospital.

Jones purchased a brick-making machine and set the inmates to work making bricks. After amassing 3 million bricks of excellent quality, he was able to get the state legislature to appropriate funds to build decent buildings with the bricks the inmates had produced. Five buildings were built with the bricks and the capacity of the Asylum was increased from 166 to over 600, which permitted the closure of the infamous Marine Hospital at New Orleans, with 130 inmates being transferred in one day.

Jones appointed his son, Philip Huff Jones, M. D., to be assistant superintendent.

After fourteen years of service and with the Asylum now greatly enlarged, improved, and providing humane care to its inmates, Jones resigned from his position as Superintendent and returned to private life. A portrait of Jones hangs in the East Louisiana Hospital.

== Later life ==
Jones now made his home in Jackson, Louisiana and turned to the administration of his agricultural properties. He acquired several plantations in the area.

== Personal life ==
Jones married Amarintha Huff who was born in Wilkinson County, Mississippi on July 23, 1833, the daughter of Philip and Martha Jackson Huff. Amarintha's father, Philip Huff, was a prominent planter in Wilkinson County. Her mother, Martha Jackson, was the daughter of Thomas Jackson, who fought with General Francis Marion in South Carolina and removed to Amite County, Mississippi in 1805.

Dr. and Mrs. Jones were members of the First Baptist Church of Jackson, Louisiana. Dr. Jones was a Mason and a member of the United Confederate Veterans.

Of the marriage, ten children were born of which five died in early childhood. The five surviving children were:

- Philip Huff Jones, M. D. (1855–1946), who married Annabelle Smith, daughter of John Scott Smith and Tullia (Richardson) Smith in 1882, and practiced medicine at Baton Rouge, Louisiana where he was president of the City Board of Health.
- George Hilton Jones, M. D. (1861-1927), who practiced medicine at Lutcher, Louisiana. He married Sarah Elizabeth Keller (d. 1959) (sister to George Keller) Dr. and Mrs. George Hilton Jones are buried in the Keller family cemetery on China Berry Plantation in East Feliciana Parish about two miles east of Jackson.
- Pearl Jones (1871-1946), who married Mr. George Keller, a planter who lived in Jackson, Louisiana.
- Lily Jones (Dec 19, 1873 – July 11, 1944), who resided with her sister in Jackson, until her final years when she resided with her brother, Carruth, in Baton Rouge.
- Judge William Carruth Jones (1876–1943), who married pianist Elizabeth Fly Kirkpatrick, eldest daughter of pharmacist James Roger Kirkpatrick and Ida Fly of Natchez, Mississippi, and practiced law in Baton Rouge, Louisiana until he was elected to the bench.

== Deaths ==
Mrs. Amarintha Huff Jones preceded her husband in death on May 3, 1889. Dr. Jones lived until June 24, 1916. Both are buried in the Old Jackson Cemetery in Jackson, Louisiana.
