= John Paul Jones (Louisiana politician) =

American politician

Member of the Louisiana State Senate
- In office 1912–1916
- Preceded by: Rush Wimberly
- Succeeded by: A. R. Johnson

Personal details
- Party: Democratic
- Profession: Politician

John Paul Jones was a state senator in Louisiana. He represented Bienville Parish from 1912 to 1916. He succeeded Rush Wimberly in the state senate. He lived in the Jones House. He was a Democrat. A. R. Johnson succeeded him.
