= National Register of Historic Places listings in East Feliciana Parish, Louisiana =

Location of East Feliciana Parish in Louisiana

This is a list of the National Register of Historic Places listings in East Feliciana Parish, Louisiana.

This is intended to be a complete list of the properties and districts on the National Register of Historic Places in East Feliciana Parish, Louisiana, United States. The locations of National Register properties and districts for which the latitude and longitude coordinates are included below, may be seen in a map.

There are 33 properties and districts listed on the National Register in the parish, including 2 National Historic Landmarks.

This National Park Service list is complete through NPS recent listings posted May 1, 2026.

== Current listings ==
	Name on the Register	Image	Date listed	Location	City or town	Description
1	1903 Clinton High School	1903 Clinton High School	June 1, 2005 (#05000505)	11048 Bank Street; 30°51′47″N 91°01′10″W	Clinton	
2	1938 Clinton High School	1938 Clinton High School	June 1, 2005 (#05000506)	10410 Plank Road; 30°51′45″N 91°00′50″W	Clinton	Classical Revival school designed by Herman J. Duncan
3	Asphodel Plantation and Cemetery	Asphodel Plantation and Cemetery	November 15, 1972 (#72000552)	About 3.5 miles (5.6 km) south of Jackson on LA 68; 30°47′12″N 91°13′02″W	Jackson vicinity	
4	Avondale Plantation Home	Avondale Plantation Home	December 17, 1982 (#82000434)	Along Andrews Road, about 0.87 miles (1.40 km) southeast of LA 10; 30°51′47″N 90°59′10″W	Clinton vicinity	
5	Bank of Slaughter	Bank of Slaughter	May 6, 2005 (#05000369)	3323 Church Street; 30°43′04″N 91°08′40″W	Slaughter	
6	Boatner House	Boatner House	May 31, 1980 (#80001719)	Corner of Plank Road and Taylor Street; 30°51′49″N 91°00′54″W	Clinton	
7	Brame-Bennett House	Brame-Bennett House	May 22, 1973 (#73000866)	Along Plank Road, directly opposite Boatner House; 30°51′49″N 91°00′57″W	Clinton	
8	Carroll House	Carroll House	June 29, 1998 (#98000679)	9553 Bank Street Extension; 30°50′03″N 91°00′46″W	Clinton vicinity	
9	Centenary College	Centenary College	April 19, 1979 (#79001062)	Along College Street; 30°50′33″N 91°12′41″W	Jackson	Now a Louisiana State historic site operated as Centenary State Historic Site. Also a contributing property to Jackson Historic District since its creation on December 4, 1980.
10	Center Building of East Louisiana State Hospital	Center Building of East Louisiana State Hospital	August 1, 1980 (#80001721)	Southeast of Jackson on LA 951; 30°49′59″N 91°12′47″W	Jackson	
11	Clear Creek AME Church	Clear Creek AME Church	March 28, 2002 (#02000269)	Along LA 961, about 0.37 miles (0.60 km) south of Felixville; 30°56′13″N 90°52′38″W	Felixville vicinity	
12	Courthouse and Lawyers' Row	Courthouse and Lawyers' Row	May 30, 1974 (#74002249)	Bounded by Liberty Street, St. Helena Street, Bank Street, and Woodville Street; 30°51′59″N 91°01′06″W	Clinton	
13	East Feliciana Parish Courthouse	East Feliciana Parish Courthouse	June 4, 1973 (#73002232)	Public Square; 30°51′58″N 91°01′06″W	Clinton	Also a contributing property to Courthouse and Lawyers' Row National Historic Landmark District since its creation on May 30, 1974.
14	Fairview Plantation House		August 12, 1993 (#93000821)	8338 LA 963, about 4.4 miles (7.1 km) west of Clinton; 30°51′48″N 91°05′31″W	Ethel vicinity	Also known as Lakeview
15	Heyman-Stewart House	Heyman-Stewart House	November 9, 2001 (#01001211)	10943 Bank Street; 30°51′41″N 91°01′07″W	Clinton	
16	Hickory Hill Plantation House		June 17, 2025 (#100011968)	6139 Highway 952; 30°55′41″N 91°09′05″W	Jackson	
17	Holly Grove		February 14, 1997 (#97000058)	10929 Rouchon Lane; 30°55′43″N 90°56′59″W	Clinton vicinity	
18	Hope Terrace	Hope Terrace	August 13, 1986 (#86001493)	Corner of Church Street and Silliman Street; 30°51′35″N 91°00′58″W	Clinton	
19	Jackson Historic District	Jackson Historic District	December 4, 1980 (#80001722)	Roughly bounded by College Street, LA 952, Horton Street and Race Street; 30°50′21″N 91°12′56″W	Jackson	
20	Lane Plantation House		April 22, 1993 (#93000322)	7684 Lane Road, about 3.2 miles (5.1 km) northeast of Ethel; 30°48′32″N 91°04′54″W	Ethel vicinity	
21	Linwood	Linwood	June 9, 1980 (#80001723)	End of Dougherty Road, about 7.8 miles (12.6 km) south of Jackson; 30°43′28″N 91°13′52″W	Jackson vicinity	
22	Marston House	Marston House	June 29, 1972 (#72000551)	Northwest corner of Bank Street and Marston Street; 30°51′44″N 91°01′09″W	Clinton	
23	Oakland Plantation House		October 3, 1980 (#80001720)	Along LA 963, about 0.63 miles (1.01 km) west of Gurley; 30°52′18″N 91°08′41″W	Gurley vicinity	
24	Port Hudson	Port Hudson	May 30, 1974 (#74002349)	Port Hudson and nearby area along US 61; 30°41′36″N 91°16′33″W	Port Hudson	Site of the longest siege in U.S. history, 1863's Siege of Port Hudson during the American Civil War.
25	Richland Plantation		March 28, 1979 (#79001064)	7240 Azalea Street (LA 422), about 4.4 miles (7.1 km) east of Norwood, Louisiana; 30°59′20″N 91°02′03″W	Norwood vicinity	
26	St. Andrew's Episcopal Church	St. Andrew's Episcopal Church	June 21, 1984 (#84001282)	11015 Church Street; 30°51′44″N 91°00′58″W	Clinton	
27	The Shades		November 6, 1980 (#80001724)	About 6 miles (9.7 km) northeast of Jackson; 30°54′29″N 91°09′26″W	Jackson vicinity	
28	Silliman Institute	Silliman Institute	April 18, 1983 (#83000504)	10830 Bank Street; 30°51′33″N 91°01′11″W	Clinton	
29	Taylor House		December 8, 1997 (#97001518)	In Villa Feliciana Hospital grounds, about 850 yards (780 m) north of LA 10; 30°50′12″N 91°09′27″W	Jackson vicinity	Also known as Woodlawn.
30	Thompson House		September 29, 1980 (#80001725)	Along LA 68, about 5.2 miles (8.4 km) northeast of Jackson; 30°53′25″N 91°09′20″W	Jackson vicinity	Also known as Glencoe and Westerfields.
31	Wall House	Wall House	May 31, 1984 (#84001285)	Woodville Street; 30°52′01″N 91°00′49″W	Clinton	
32	Wildwood Plantation House	Wildwood Plantation House	June 30, 1988 (#88000977)	Along LA 68, about 9.6 miles (15.4 km) south of Jackson; 30°42′09″N 91°15′41″W	Jackson vicinity	
33	Woodside	Woodside	October 4, 1984 (#84000012)	12415 St. Helena Street; 30°51′56″N 91°00′58″W	Clinton	

== See also ==
- List of Louisiana state historic sites
- List of National Historic Landmarks in Louisiana
- National Register of Historic Places listings in West Feliciana Parish, Louisiana
