= Courthouse and Lawyers' Row =

- The Courthouse and Lawyers' Row
- U.S. National Register of Historic Places
- U.S. National Historic Landmark District
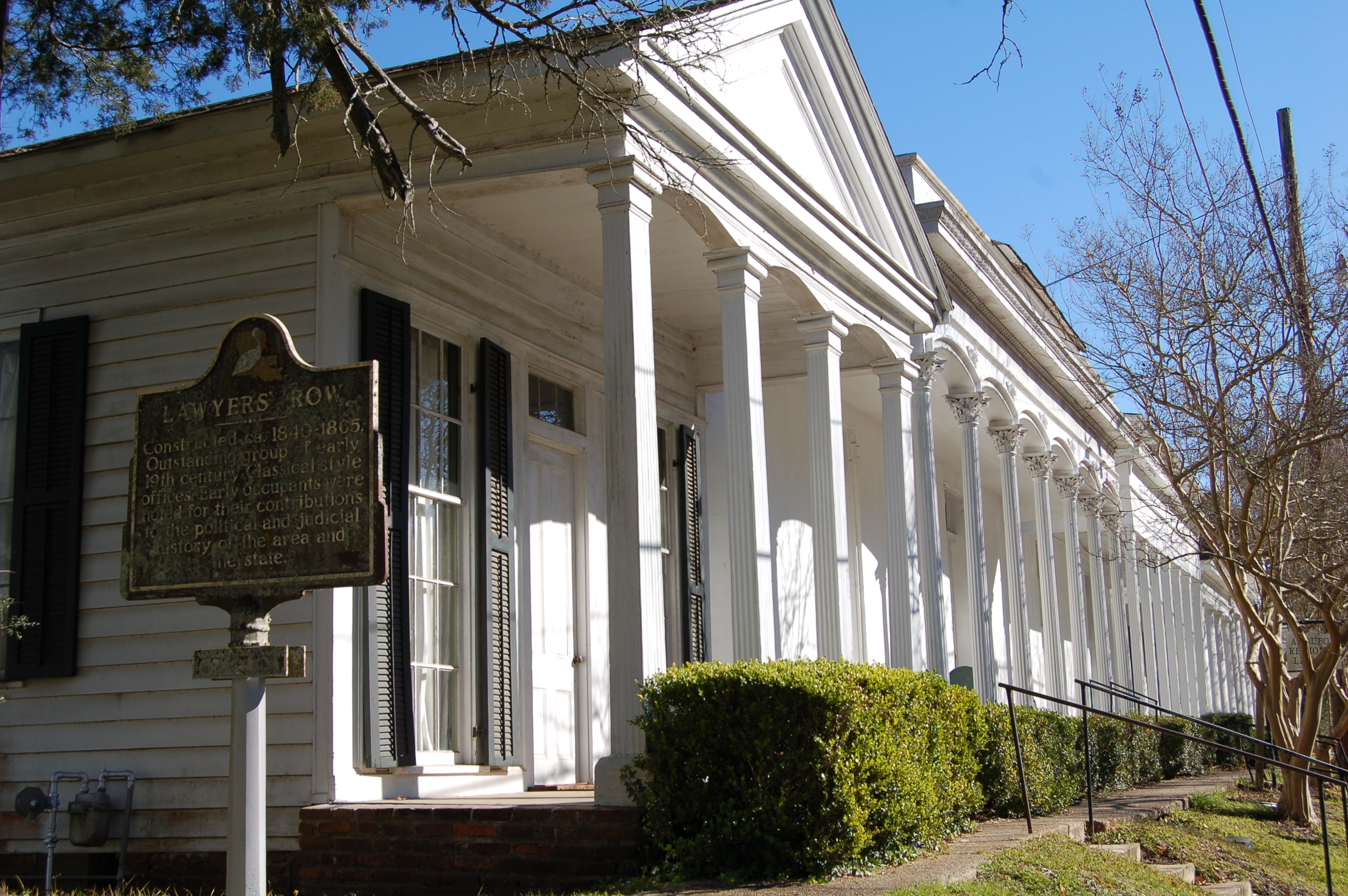
- Lawyers Row in Clinton LA with State Historical marker.

- Location within Louisiana Location within the United States
- Interactive map showing the location of Courthouse and Lawyer’s Row
- Location: Bounded by Liberty Street, St. Helena Street, Bank Street, and Woodville Street, Clinton, Louisiana
- Coordinates: 30°51′59″N 91°01′06″W
- Area: 4 acres (1.6 ha)
- Built: 1840
- Architectural style: Greek Revival
- NRHP reference No.: 74002249

Significant dates
- Added to NRHP: May 30, 1974
- Designated NHLD: May 30, 1974

Courthouse and Lawyers' Row is a National Historic Landmark District in the center of Clinton, Louisiana. Encompassing the individually listed East Feliciana Parish Courthouse and a series of five law office buildings located 12216 to 12230 Woodville Road, it represents a unique assemblage of law-related high quality Greek Revival buildings. It was added to the National Register of Historic Places and declared a National Historic Landmark on May 30, 1974.

== Description and history ==
Clinton, Louisiana, has been the parish seat of East Feliciana Parish since its establishment in 1824. The East Feliciana Parish Courthouse is centrally located, occupying a city block bounded by St. Helena, Bank, Liberty, and Woodville Streets. It is a handsome Greek Revival brick building, with white plaster walls and an octagonal cupola atop its hip roof. The entire building is encircled by Doric colonnade. It was built in 1840 to a design by J.S. Savage.

Across Woodville Street from the courthouse are arrayed five single-story Greek Revival buildings, all of which have historically house law offices. Four of the five were also built in the 1840s, resulting in a distinctive collection of law-related Greek Revival buildings. The fifth law office was built in 1860, and is also Greek Revival despite the style having passed out of fashion by then. The block is framed by a private residence on the left and a two-story brick building, formerly a Masonic lodge, on the right. The law offices and the lodge all have columned porticos, four columns for the single-unit buildings, and seven for the wider buildings that have two offices.

== See also ==
- List of National Historic Landmarks in Louisiana
- National Register of Historic Places listings in East Feliciana Parish, Louisiana
