= Avondale Plantation Home =

Historic house in Louisiana, United States

- U.S. National Register of Historic Places
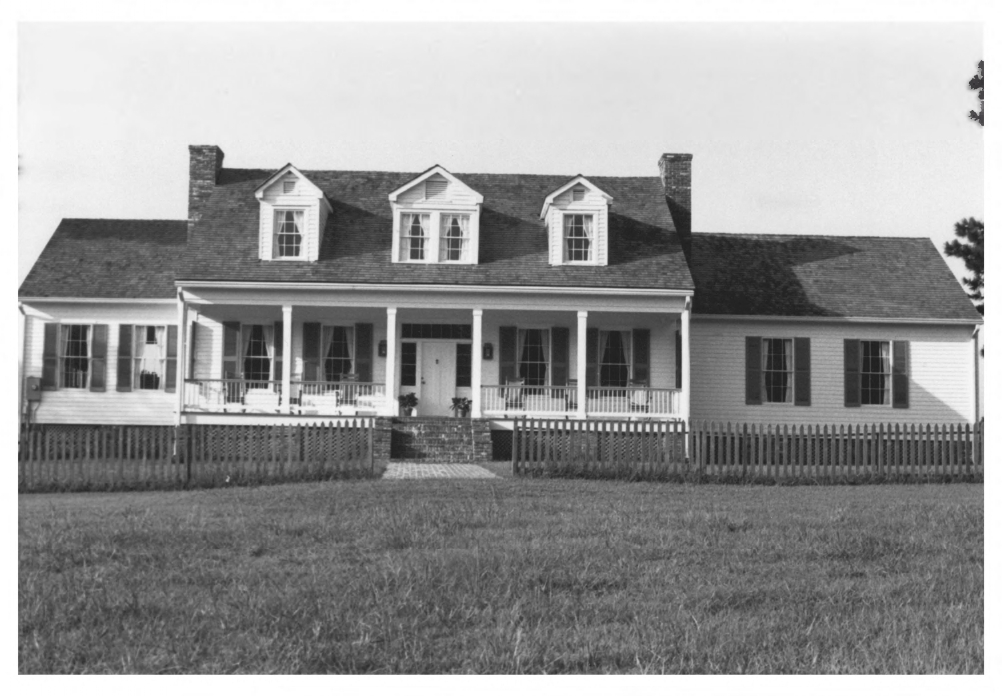

- Location within Louisiana Location within the United States
- Location: Along Andrews Road, about 0.87 miles (1.40 km) southeast of LA 10
- Nearest city: Clinton, Louisiana
- Coordinates: 30°51′47″N 90°59′10″W
- Area: 0.3 acres (0.12 ha)
- Built: 1825
- Architectural style: Greek Revival
- NRHP reference No.: 82000434
- Added to NRHP: December 17, 1982

Avondale Plantation Home is a historic plantation house located along Andrews Road, about 0.87 miles (1.40 km) southeast of Louisiana Highway 10, and about 1.77 miles (2.85 km) east of Clinton, Louisiana. It was built in 1825 and was added to the National Register of Historic Places on December 17, 1982.

It is a one-and-a-half-story Greek Revival-style house which was, in 1982, located on an open hilltop near the town of Clinton. In 1980 it was moved 1.5 miles (2.4 km) to its actual location, from the Avon Plantation site which had long earlier become a Boy Scout summer camp named Camp Avondale.

== See also ==
- List of plantations in Louisiana
- National Register of Historic Places listings in East Feliciana Parish, Louisiana
