= Marston House (Clinton, Louisiana) =

Historic house in Louisiana, United States

- U.S. National Register of Historic Places
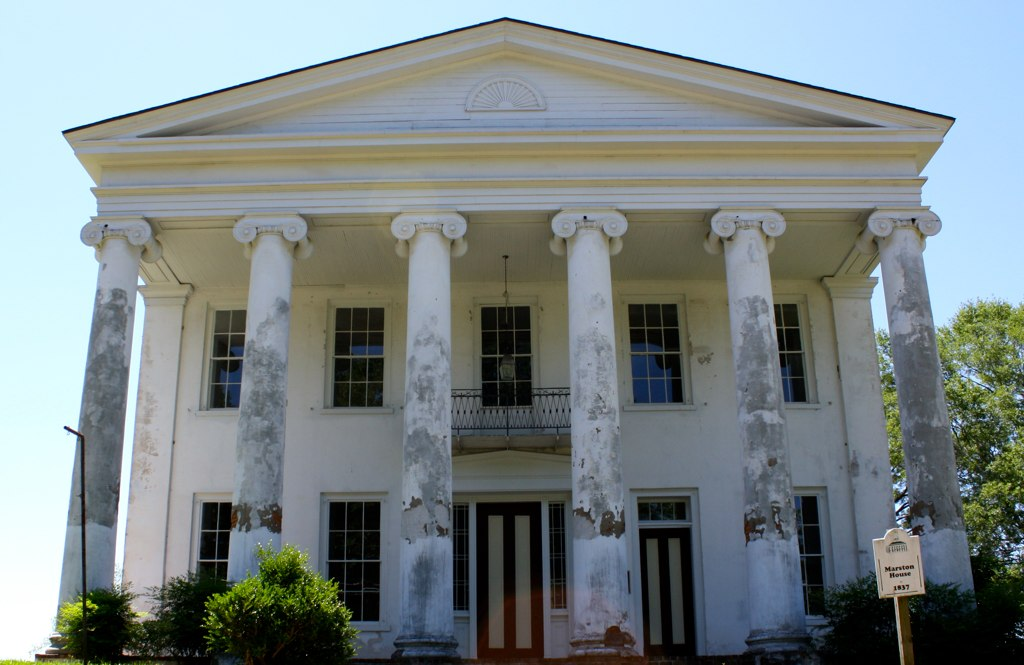

- Location within Louisiana Location within the United States
- Location: Northwest corner of Bank Street and Marston Street, Clinton, Louisiana
- Coordinates: 30°51′44″N 91°01′09″W
- Area: 0.1 acres (0.040 ha)
- Built: 1837
- Architectural style: Greek Revival
- NRHP reference No.: 72000551
- Added to NRHP: June 29, 1972

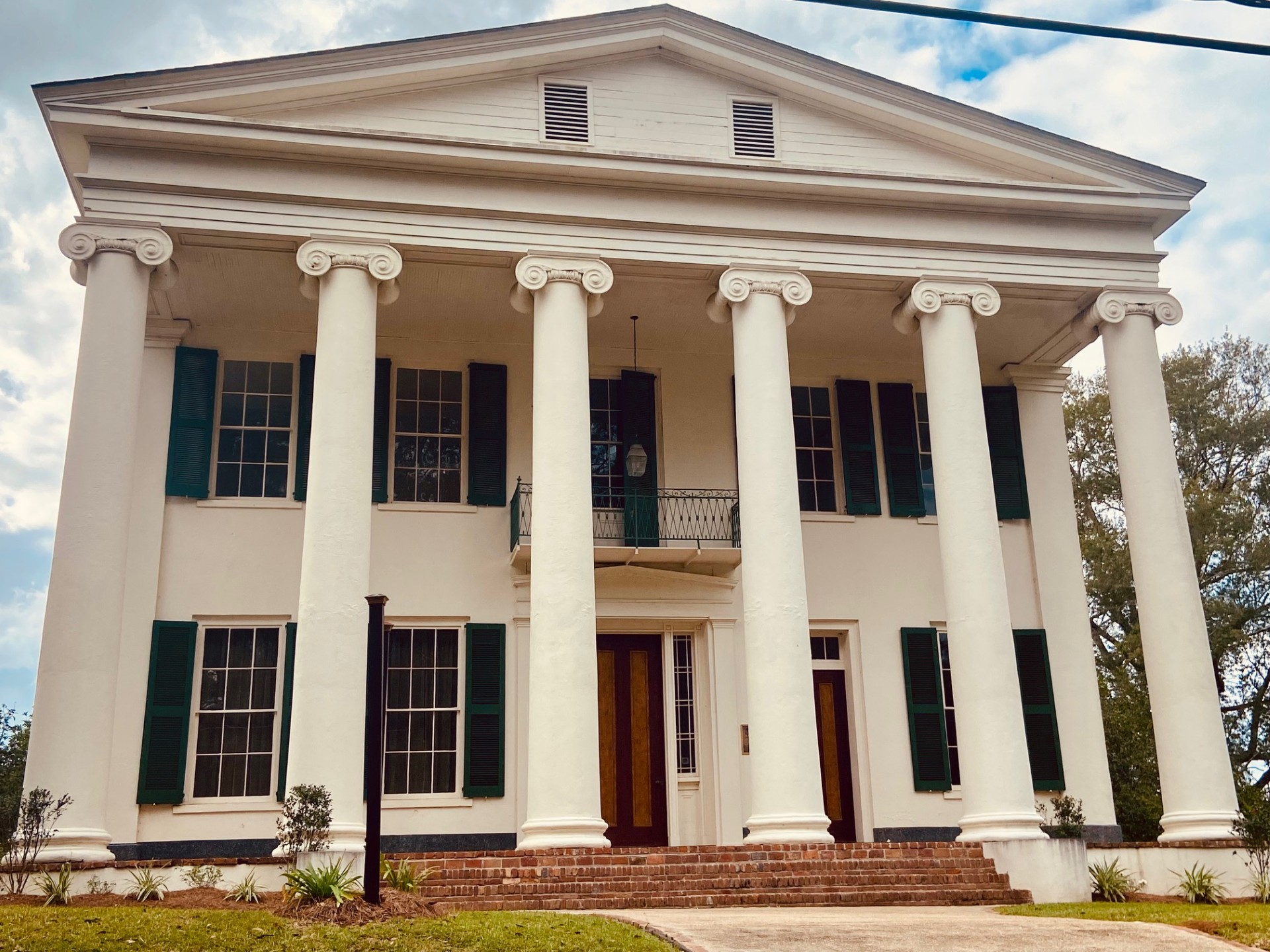

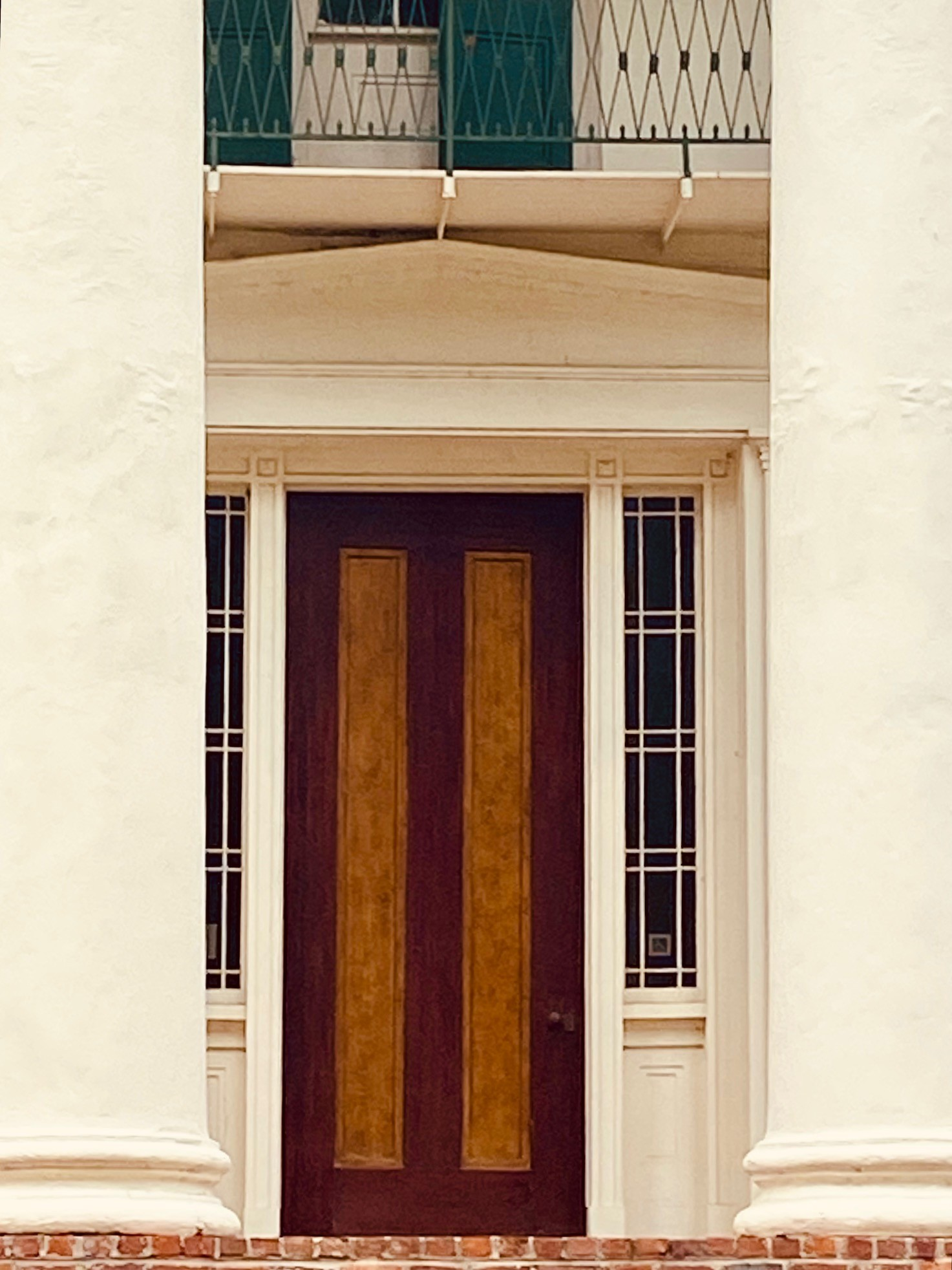

Marston House is a historic mansion located at the corner of Bank Street and Marston Street in Clinton, East Feliciana Paris, Louisiana, USA.

== History ==
The Marston House was built in the 1830s for the Union Bank of New Orleans. It was completed by Henry Marston, a cashier, in 1835. After the 1837 hurricane, Marston built more columns. Marston was the owner of slave plantations, and three of his sons served in the Confederate States Army during the American Civil War of 1861–1865.

The house remained in the Marston family until 1941, when they donated it to the East Feliciana Parish. The parish leased it to the East Feliciana Pilgrimage and Garden Club in 1958, and they held fundraisers for its restoration. In the early 2000, it was leased to TrueHeart Feliciana, which restored it with state funds. In the aftermath of Hurricane Katrina in 2005, the house was run by the Federal Emergency Management Agency. In 2013, it was restored by James G. Marston III, Henry Marston's great-great-grandson.

== Architectural significance ==
The house was listed on the National Register of Historic Places on June 29, 1972.

== See also ==
- Marston House: also in Clinton
- National Register of Historic Places listings in East Feliciana Parish, Louisiana
