= Boatner House =

Historic house in Louisiana, United States

- U.S. National Register of Historic Places
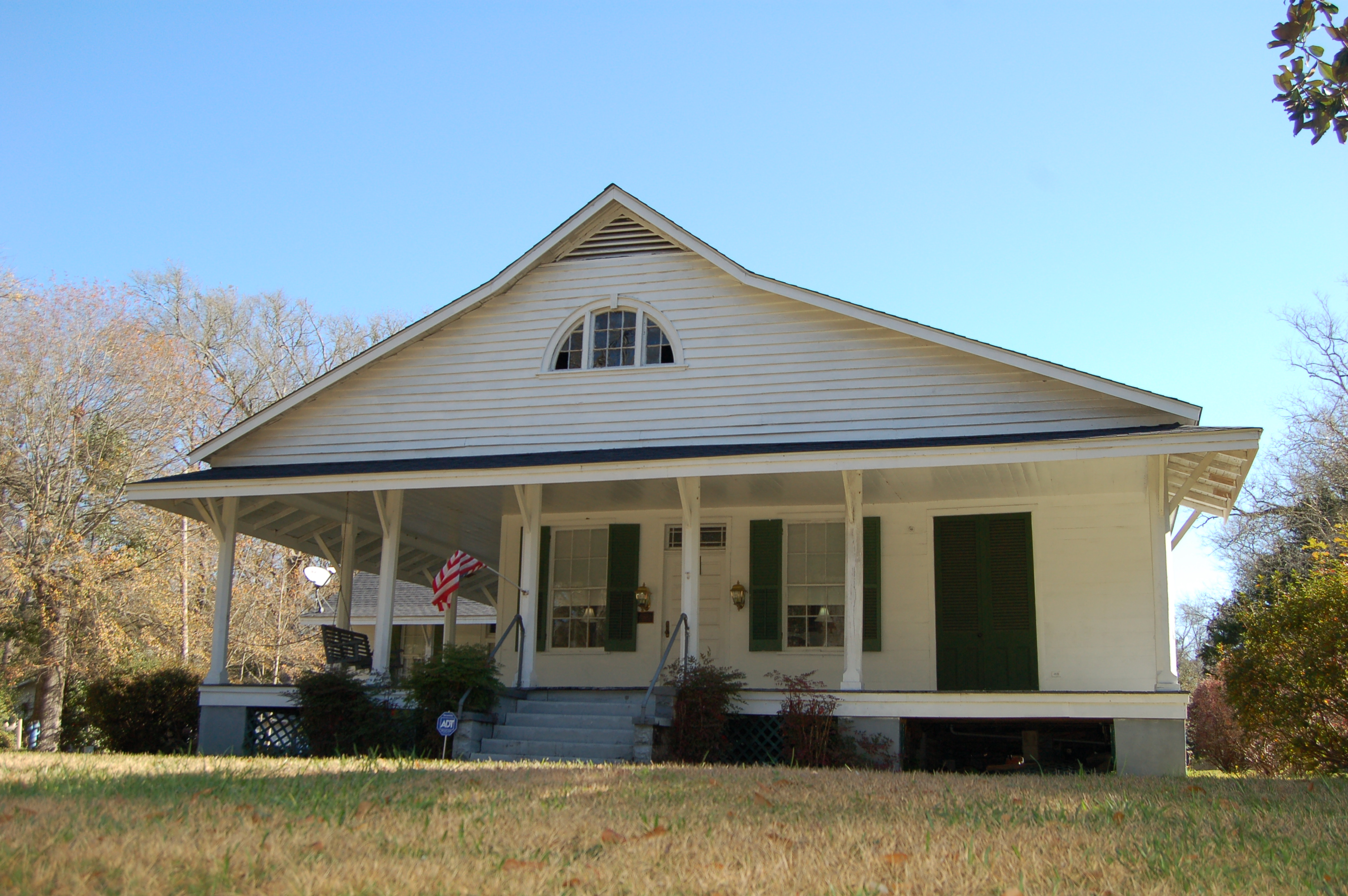

- Location within Louisiana Location within the United States
- Location: Corner of Plank Road and Taylor Street, Clinton, Louisiana
- Coordinates: 30°51′49″N 91°00′54″W
- Area: 0.5 acres (0.20 ha)
- Built: 1835
- Architectural style: Creole-Style
- NRHP reference No.: 80001719
- Added to NRHP: May 31, 1980

The Boatner House, also known as the Record House, is a historic mansion located at the corner of Plank Road and Taylor Street in Clinton in East Feliciana Parish, Louisiana.

It was built in 1835. Its NRHP nomination asserts:

The Boatner house is significant in the area of architecture as an [sic] unique example of Creole architectural influence in a town which is widely supposed to be wholly English in its background. It is also noteworthy for its handsome Federal Adams mantels which are the finest mantels in the town.

The house was listed on the National Register of Historic Places on May 31, 1980.

== See also ==
- Marston House: also in Clinton
- National Register of Historic Places listings in East Feliciana Parish, Louisiana
