= Istrouma Area Council =

Boy Scouts of America council

Istrouma Area Council (#211)
- Owner: Boy Scouts of America
- Headquarters: Baton Rouge, Louisiana
- Location: 4307 Bluebonnet Blvd. Suite B.
- Country: United States
- Founded: 1917
- Council President: David Broussard
- Council Commissioner: Phillip Durocher
- Scout Executive: Michael G. Beer
- Website http://www.IstroumaScouting.org/

Istrouma Area Council serves Scouts in both Louisiana and Mississippi, primarily in the Greater Baton Rouge Area and Florida Parishes. Specifically, the council includes Scouts from the following parishes: Ascension, East Baton Rouge, West Baton Rouge, East Feliciana, West Feliciana, Iberville, Pointe Coupee, St. Helena, St. James, St. Tammany, Washington, and Tangipahoa. Wilkinson County is the sole Mississippi county in the council.

== History ==
Scouting came to Louisiana shortly after the establishment of the Boy Scouts of America in 1910. Rev. T. M. Hunter of the First Presbyterian Church of Baton Rouge established the first troop in that year, and two years later, affiliated the troop with BSA. The Istrouma Area Council was officially established in 1919. In 1923, the Rotary Club of Baton Rouge presented the council with a 15-acre (61,000 m^{2}) campsite in Greenwell Springs called Camp Istrouma. After the council outgrew the camp, they raised money to move to the Avondale Scout Reservation located in East Feliciana Parish, doing so by the late 1950s. Istrouma was later sold to the United Methodist Church and serves as a Christian camp to this day.

In 1917, the Baton Rouge Council (#211) was formed, changing its name to the East Baton Rouge Parish Council (#211) in 1922. It changed its name to the Istrouma Area Council (#211) in 1924. In 1924, the Old Hickory Area Council (#657) was formed, merging into the Istrouma Area Council (#211) in 1931.

Since 1935, Scouts from the council serve as ushers and stretcher bearers at LSU home football games at Tiger Stadium.

== Organization ==
The council is administratively divided into two service areas:

- Capital Service Area - the greater Baton Rouge Area, which is currently sub-divided into 4 districts, but served by a single district executive and operating as a service area for functions.

1. Western - city of Zachary in East Baton Rouge Parish, West Baton Rouge, Iberville, East Feliciana, West Feliciana, Livingston, and Pointe Coupee parishes in Louisiana

2. Red Stick- Collaboration with the East Baton Rouge Housing Authority and select Elementary Schools to bring Scouting to inner city youth in the Baton Rouge area. These youth do not have the funding, transportation, or volunteer leadership available to participate in Scouting in the traditional sense.

3. Central - East Baton Rouge (minus Zachary) and Western Livingston Parishes.

4. Southern - Ascension, Assumption, and St. James Parishes.

- Eastern Service Area - which is currently sub-divided into 4 districts, but served by a single district executive and operating as a service area for functions.

1. Northshore District - serving the communities from E. Livingston Parish to W. St. Tammany. Saint Helena Parish, Tangipahoa Parish, Washington Parish, and St. Tammany Parish except for the City of Slidell.

== Camps ==
=== Avondale Scout Reservation ===
Avondale Scout Reservation
- Location: East Feliciana Parish, Louisiana
- Coordinates: 30°52′10″N 90°57′44″W
- Founded: 1959
- Ranger: EJ Moore
- Website https://www.IstroumaScouting.org/avondalesr

Avondale Scout Reservation is a 1,665-acre (7 km^{2}) reservation for Scouting located in East Feliciana Parish, three miles (5 km) east of Clinton, on Louisiana Highway 10. It opened in 1959 and what had been the Avondale Plantation and became the default campground for Istrouma after Camp Istrouma could no longer serve the needs of the council. The property's main gate is located on Highway 10, and its second “back” gate is located on Highway 63. The property also has over 40 buildings and structures and maintains its own electrical grid and water/sewage system. The main entrance on Highway 10 is also home to a welcome center that houses the Camp Administrator's office, a building housing the reservation's firetruck, and a cluster of ranger's cabins. Following the main gate is Camp Avondale, also known as the Summer Camp Area. The summer camp area is home to 17 campsites, each equipped with its own bathhouse. The summer camp area is also home to numerous program buildings, including a 300-person dining hall, health lodge, trading post, Stem Center, aquatics area, shooting ranges, staff building, and numerous pavilions. The summer camp area is also home to the Avondale Museum, which houses scouting memorabilia from throughout southeast Louisiana. About ½ mile south of Camp Avondale is Wood badge Hill, which is home to numerous primitive campsites used for wilderness survival and backpacking treks, along with general use by troops. South of Woodbadge Hill is Camp Tigator, which is home to Paul Perkins Lodge and a dormitory building. Camp Tigator is used for numerous council training programs. On the backside of the property is Camp McGee, which is home to 28 campsites named after different cities within the Istrouma Area Council. Camp McGee also houses two bathhouses, a Cub Scout Program Building, and an aquatics facility. Camp McGee is mainly utilized by Cub Scouts, but used by other groups as well.

In 2001, the Manship family of Baton Rouge built a campground to accommodate handicapped Scouts. Since then, private restrooms and showers, running water, improved sewage and plumbing, better roads, and electricity have all been added to campsites for use by Scouts and Scouters. In addition, existing buildings have been renovated and expanded.

The reservation is also home to numerous archeological sites, including a cemetery, Indian Mound, and the remains of a gristmill. Avondale sports four lakes and has frontage on Sandy Creek.

=== Camp Carruth ===
Camp Carruth is located in West Baton Rouge Parish off Rosedale Road (30.463°N 91.264°W). Istrouma Area Council acquired the land in the late 1990s, and this 99-acre (400,000 m^{2}) property is used by Cub Scout Packs and ScoutBSA Troops for both day events and overnight tent camping.

== Order of the Arrow ==
Quinipissa Lodge #479 is used by the local Order of the Arrow units. It was established in 1952, and in 1969, the Caddo House at Camp Avondale was dedicated for its use.

== See also ==
- Scouting in Louisiana
