= St. Andrew's Episcopal Church (Clinton, Louisiana) =

Historic church in Louisiana, United States

- U.S. National Register of Historic Places
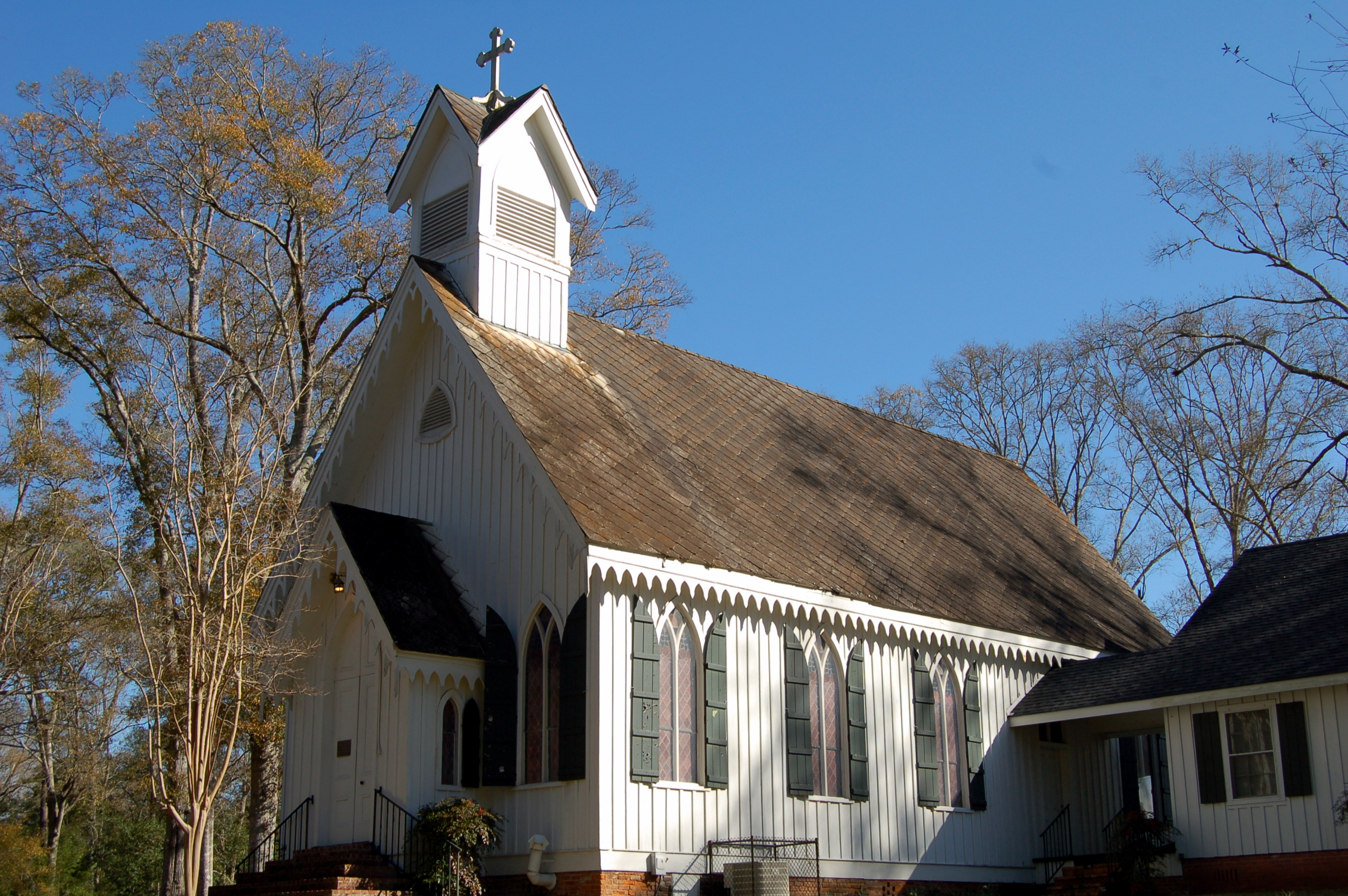

- Location within Louisiana Location within the United States
- Location: 11015 Church Street, Clinton, Louisiana
- Coordinates: 30°51′44″N 91°00′58″W
- Area: 2 acres (0.81 ha)
- Built: 1871
- Architectural style: Carpenter Gothic
- NRHP reference No.: 84001282
- Added to NRHP: June 21, 1984

St. Andrew's Episcopal Church is a historic Carpenter Gothic Episcopal Church built in 1871 and located at the corner of Church Street and St. Andrew's in Clinton, Louisiana. The cathedral reported 96 members in 2015 and 10 members in 2023; no membership statistics were reported in 2024 parochial reports. Plate and pledge income reported for the congregation in 2024 was $20,703. Average Sunday attendance (ASA) in 2024 was 12 persons.

Parts of the 1958 movie, The Long, Hot Summer, which starred Paul Newman, Lee Remick and Joanne Woodward, were filmed at the church. St. Andrew's Episcopal Church is still an active parish in the Episcopal Diocese of Louisiana.

The church was listed on the National Register of Historic Places on June 21, 1984.

The congregation meets at 9 A.M. each Sunday for Holy Eucharist three Sundays a month and Morning Prayer on the other Sunday(s). Coffee and fellowship follow immediately in the parish hall. All are welcome.

The church is located at 11015 Church St., Clinton, LA 70722. The phone number is (225) 683-5498.

== See also ==
- Clear Creek AME Church: also in East Feliciana Parish
- National Register of Historic Places listings in East Feliciana Parish, Louisiana
