= Herman J. Duncan =

American architect

Herman J. Duncan was an American architect based in Louisiana. A number of his works are listed on the U.S. National Register of Historic Places.

He was lauded for his foresight in designing the Cameron Parish, Louisiana courthouse to survive hurricanes, possibly saving hundreds of lives. The building served as refuge for many and was the only building in Cameron to survive 1958 Hurricane Audrey.

Works include:

- Cameron Parish courthouse (1938)
- Clinton High School (1938), 12525 Cedar, Clinton, Louisiana
- Edward Benjamin Dubuisson House (1927), 437 N. Court St., Opelousas, LA
- Franklinton High School, 617 Main St., Franklinton, Louisiana (Herman J. Duncan & Co.)
- Masonic Building, Fourth and Johnston Sts., Alexandria, Louisiana
- Sunset High School, 223 Marie St., Sunset, Louisiana

== See also ==
- St. Philip's Episcopal Church, 414 Clara St., Boyce, LA associated with Rev. Herman C. Duncan.
