= John D. Travis =

American politician (1940–2016)

John Dean Travis

Member of the Louisiana House of Representatives
- In office 1984–2000

Personal details
- Born: October 8, 1940 Clinton, Louisiana
- Died: April 21, 2016 (aged 75) Baton Rouge, Louisiana
- Party: Democratic
- Profession: Finance manager

John Dean Travis (October 8, 1940 – April 21, 2016) was an American politician.

Travis was born in Clinton, Louisiana. He lived in Jackson, Louisiana and was a finance manager. Travis served on the East Feliciana Parish School Board and on the Jackson Town Board. Travis served in the Louisiana House of Representatives from 1984 to 2000 and was a Democrat. Travis served as the Louisiana Commissioner of the Office of Financial Institutions. He died at Baton Rouge General Hospital in Baton Rouge, Louisiana.
