= Sunset High School (Sunset, Louisiana) =

- U.S. National Register of Historic Places
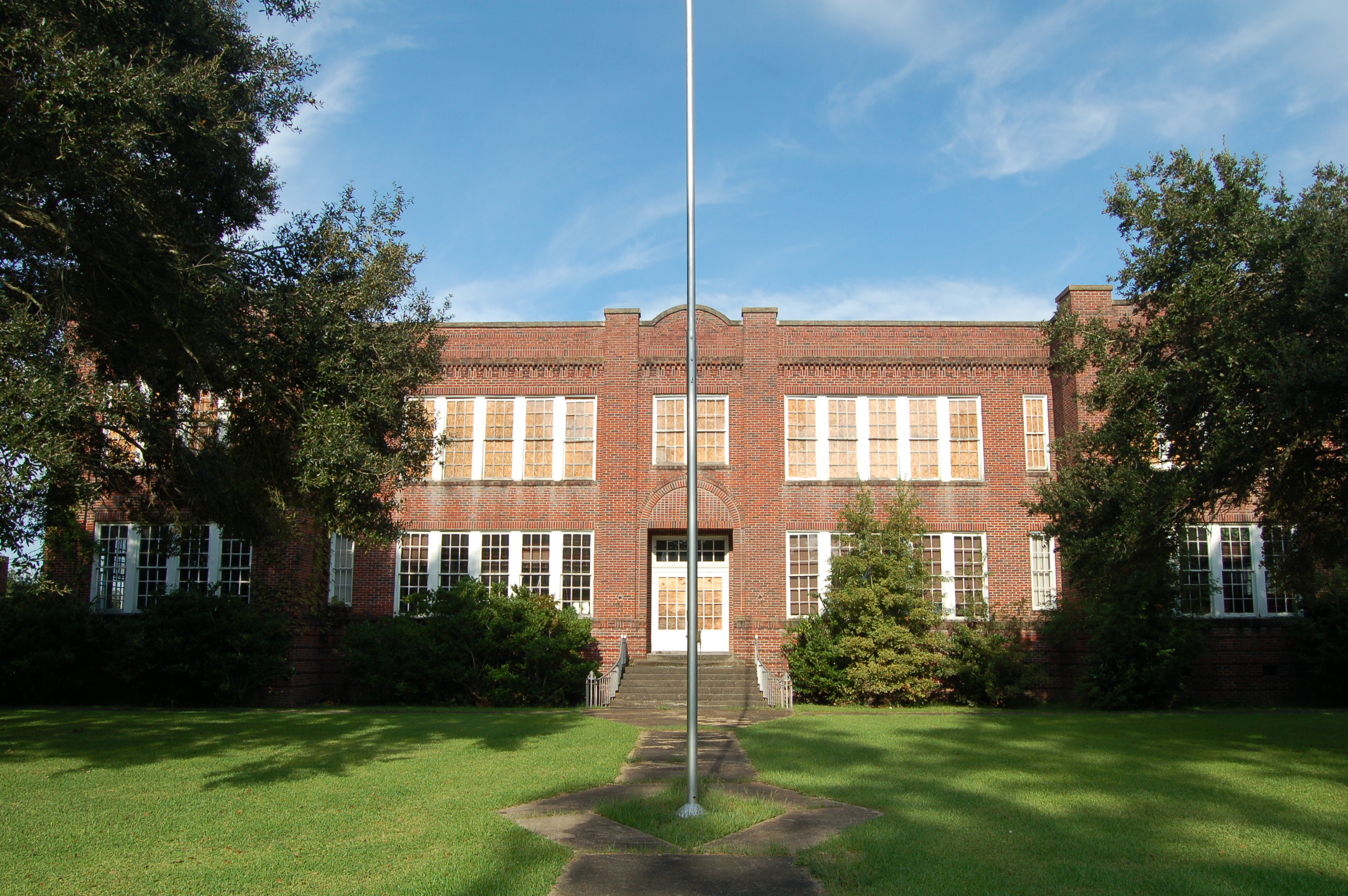
- School in 2005

- Location within Louisiana
- Location: 223 Marie Street, Sunset, Louisiana, United States
- Coordinates: 30°24′47″N 92°03′54″W
- Area: 1 acre (0.40 ha)
- Built: 1926
- Built by: Burke & Haley
- Architect: Herman J. Duncan
- NRHP reference No.: 99000556
- Added to NRHP: May 12, 1999

The Sunset High School, or Sunset School, is a historic building in Sunset, Louisiana, United States. Located at 223 Marie Street, it was designed by architect Herman J. Duncan and was built in 1926. It was listed on the National Register of Historic Places in 1999; for its history of education in southwestern St. Landry Parish.

== History ==
The Sunset School was first opened in 1904, in a crudely built one room structure. The school was moved to a private house, and had moved a few more times after before a new wooden structure was built in 1906. It was considered to a be a junior high school in 1906, offering education for grades 1–7.

The current Sunset High School building was completed in 1926, and featured a two-story brick masonry structure. Its National Register nomination stated "Although the building's exterior does exhibit a few low-key decorative features, the school should be classified as having 'no style' for the purposes of this nomination." It was, however, deemed "significant in the area of education because its 1926 construction represents the 'coming of age' of public education in southwestern St. Landry Parish."
