= Richland Plantation =

Historic house in Louisiana, United States

- U.S. National Register of Historic Places
- Location within Louisiana Location within the United States
- Location: 7240 Azalea Street (LA 422), about 4.4 miles (7.1 km) east of Norwood, Louisiana
- Nearest city: Norwood, Louisiana
- Coordinates: 30°59′20″N 91°02′03″W
- Area: 25 acres (10 ha)
- Built: 1820
- Architect: Elias Norwood
- Architectural style: Greek Revival, Federal, Central Hall
- NRHP reference No.: 79001064
- Added to NRHP: March 28, 1979

Richland Plantation is a cotton plantation comprising a historic plantation house located at 7240 Azalea Street (LA 422), about 4.4 miles (7.1 km) east of Norwood, Louisiana.

Elias Norwood built the house in 1820 following the typical layout of the period with a large central hall separating rooms on either side.

The 25 acres (10 ha) area comprising the mansion was added to the National Register of Historic Places on March 28, 1979.

== Skirmish at Richland Plantation ==
On January 30, 1865, a skirmish between US and Confederate Forces took place near Richland Plantation, as reported by Col. Willard Sayles (3rd Rhode Island Cavalry).

"...The party moved south from Richland plantation, driving a party of twenty or more guerrillas, commanded by one Brown, a Confederate captain, to another camp on a small plantation owned by Alexander Ambreaux. Here they disappeared in the swamp, where it was entirely impracticable to follow them. Our party then retired two miles, to the Richland plantation, posted pickets, and encamped. During the night the guerrillas attempted to break through our pickets, were fired upon, and retreated with one man severely wounded."

== See also ==
- List of plantations in Louisiana
- National Register of Historic Places listings in East Feliciana Parish, Louisiana
