= Silliman Institute =

Location
- Bank Street; Clinton, Louisiana; United States

Information
- Type: Private School
- Established: 1852
- Administrator: Lenana Cupit PHD
- Grades: Pre K–12
- Enrollment: 630
- Colors: Green, Gold, & White
- Mascot: Wildcat
- Website: http://www.sillimaninstitute.org
- Silliman Institute
- U.S. National Register of Historic Places
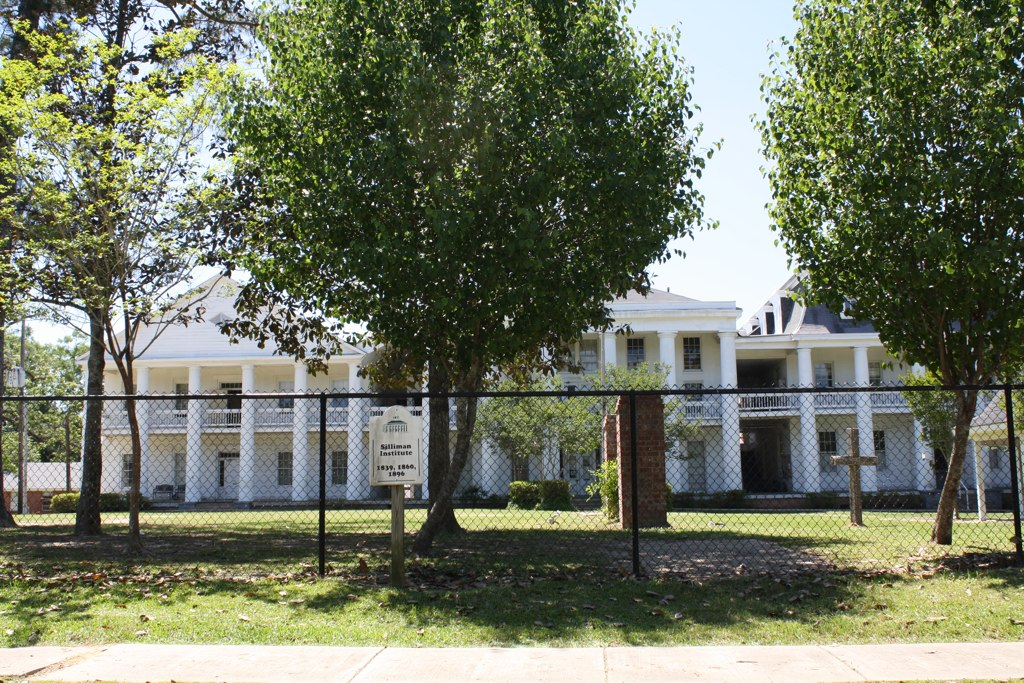
- The building in 2010

- Location within Louisiana Location within the United States
- Location: 10830 Bank Street, Clinton, Louisiana
- Coordinates: 30°51′33″N 91°01′11″W
- Area: 1.8 acres (0.73 ha)
- Built: c.1850
- Architectural style: Greek Revival, Italianate
- NRHP reference No.: 83000504
- Added to NRHP: April 18, 1983

Silliman Institute is a private coeducational school located in Clinton, Louisiana. It was founded in 1966; a previous school had operated on the site from 1852 to 1931. The school enrolls students from throughout East and West Feliciana Parish, and surrounding areas.

== History ==
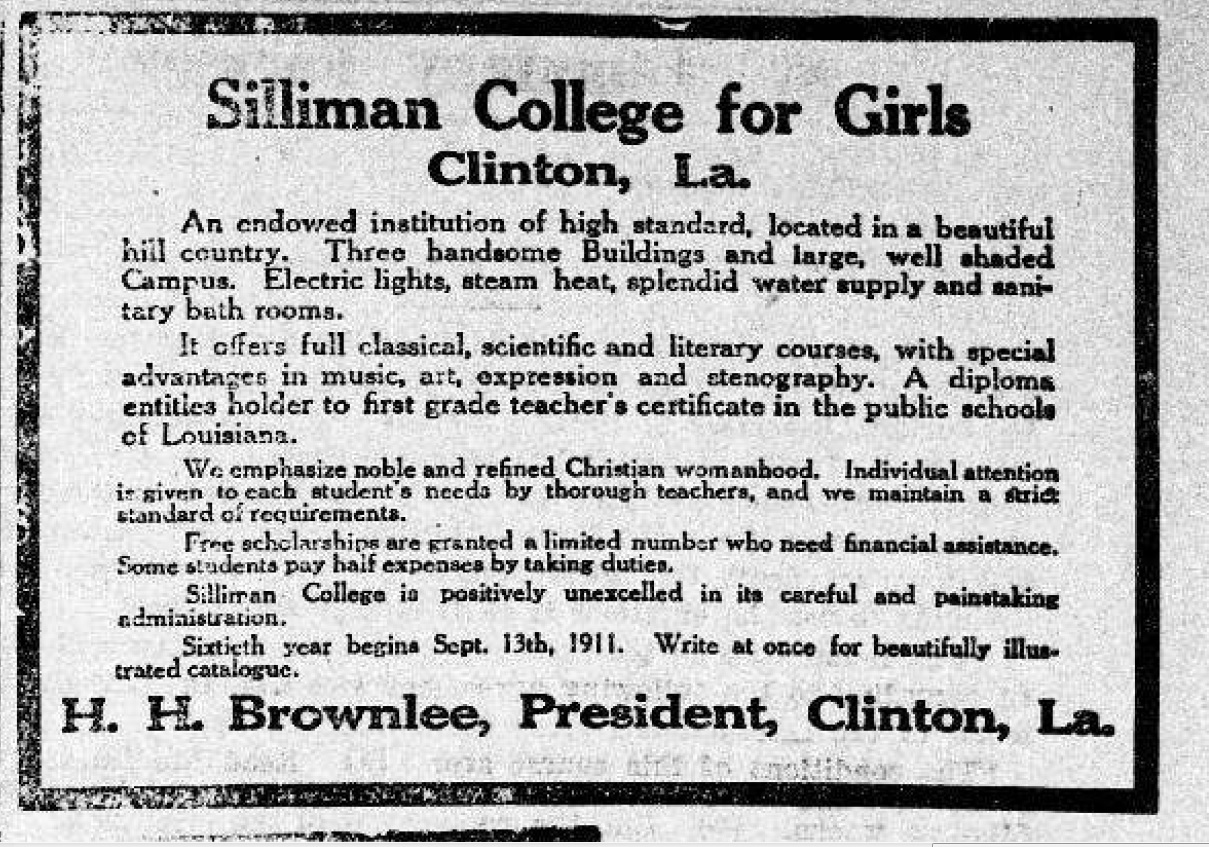
1911 Ad in St. Tammany Farmer Newspaper for Silliman College for Girls

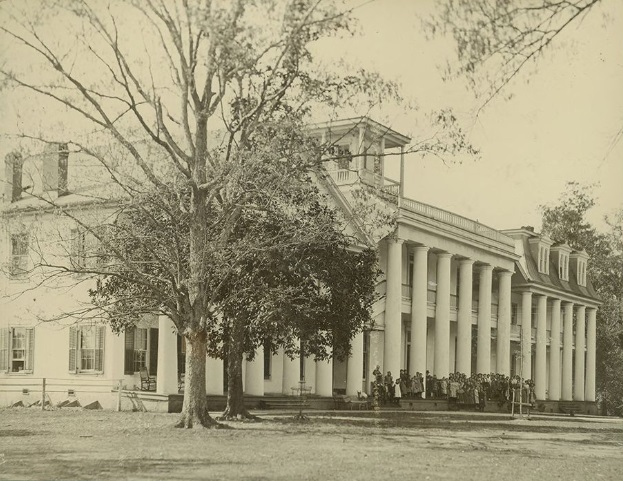
Photo of Silliman Institute in 1900.

A predecessor to the current school was founded in 1852 as Silliman Female Collegiate Institute. It operated as a women's college between the years of 1852 and 1866. In 1866, the campus was donated to the Louisiana Presbytery and was known as Silliman College until 1931 when the school was shut down due to economic conditions and declining enrollment. The campus was used by the Louisiana Presbytery between 1934 and 1960 as the site of their annual summer conferences.

A group of local parents bought the old campus in 1965 and began holding classes for grades 1 through 7 in 1966. Parents were well aware that a federal order to desegregate East Feliciana Parish public schools would be coming, as it did in 1969. Silliman was expanded to include high school in 1967.

Silliman was unusually resistant to black and white children being educated together, even among the segregation academies of the South. In 1982, it was listed as one of 111 private schools whose non-profit status had been revoked by the IRS for their discriminatory policies — the only Louisiana school on the list. In the late 1990s, Silliman was one of 23 private schools in Louisiana ruled ineligible for that state's tuition grant program because of its continued refusal to adopt racially non-discriminatory admissions policies. A majority of the school's board of directors at the time refused to allow black children admission in order to become eligible for the grants. The minority of the board issued 1,000 new shares of stock in the school's governing corporation and were sued by other directors in an attempt to prevent this attempted end-run around the majority position. The sale of the shares was approved by Judge Wilson Ramshur in November 1999.

Changes to the school's admissions policies, including a non-discrimination policy posted on the school's official website, were later instituted, allowing its graduates to qualify for the state's TOPS scholarship.

However, Silliman continues to be an overwhelmingly white school. As of 2005, the student body's makeup was 98.18% white, with 2 black students out of 502 total. Meanwhile, Clinton, the city the school sits in, is 58% African-American; public schools in East Feliciana Parish are 64% African-American, and teachers there are paid an average salary of $31,559, 35% below the Louisiana average.

Rather than celebrate the federal holiday Martin Luther King Jr. Day, the school instead labels the day as "Great American Heroes Day." The school is accredited by the Midsouth Association of Independent Schools—formerly Mississippi Association of Independent Schools, which was founded in 1968 as an accrediting agency for segregation academies.

A 1.8 acres (0.73 ha) area comprising the three main historic buildings was added to the National Register of Historic Places on April 18, 1983. The three buildings (built c.1850, c.1860, and 1894) are brick structures in Greek Revival, Italianate and Second Empire styles whose front galleries join to form a continuous colonnade.

== Accreditation ==
The school is accredited by the Midsouth Association of Independent Schools. —formerly Mississippi Association of Independent Schools, which was founded in 1968 as an accrediting agency for segregation academies. It is also accredited by the Louisiana State Board of Education.

== Athletics ==
The school competes in athletics as a member of the Midsouth Association of Independent Schools (MAIS). Prior to 1991, it competed as a member of the Louisiana Independent School Association.

Silliman offers football, basketball, baseball, softball, golf, tennis, cross country, track, cheerleading, and dance.

Rivals include Centreville Academy (Centreville, Mississippi) and the Central Private School (Central, Louisiana).

=== Championships ===
Football championships

- (1) LISA State Championships: 1974
- (3) MAIS State Championships: 1996, 2001, 2015

During the 2015 calendar year, Silliman won three State Championships in baseball, softball, and football.

== Notable alumni ==
- Roy Corcoran, former MLB player (Montreal Expos, Washington Nationals, Seattle Mariners)

== See also ==
- National Register of Historic Places listings in East Feliciana Parish, Louisiana
