= Edward Benjamin Dubuisson House =

- U.S. National Register of Historic Places
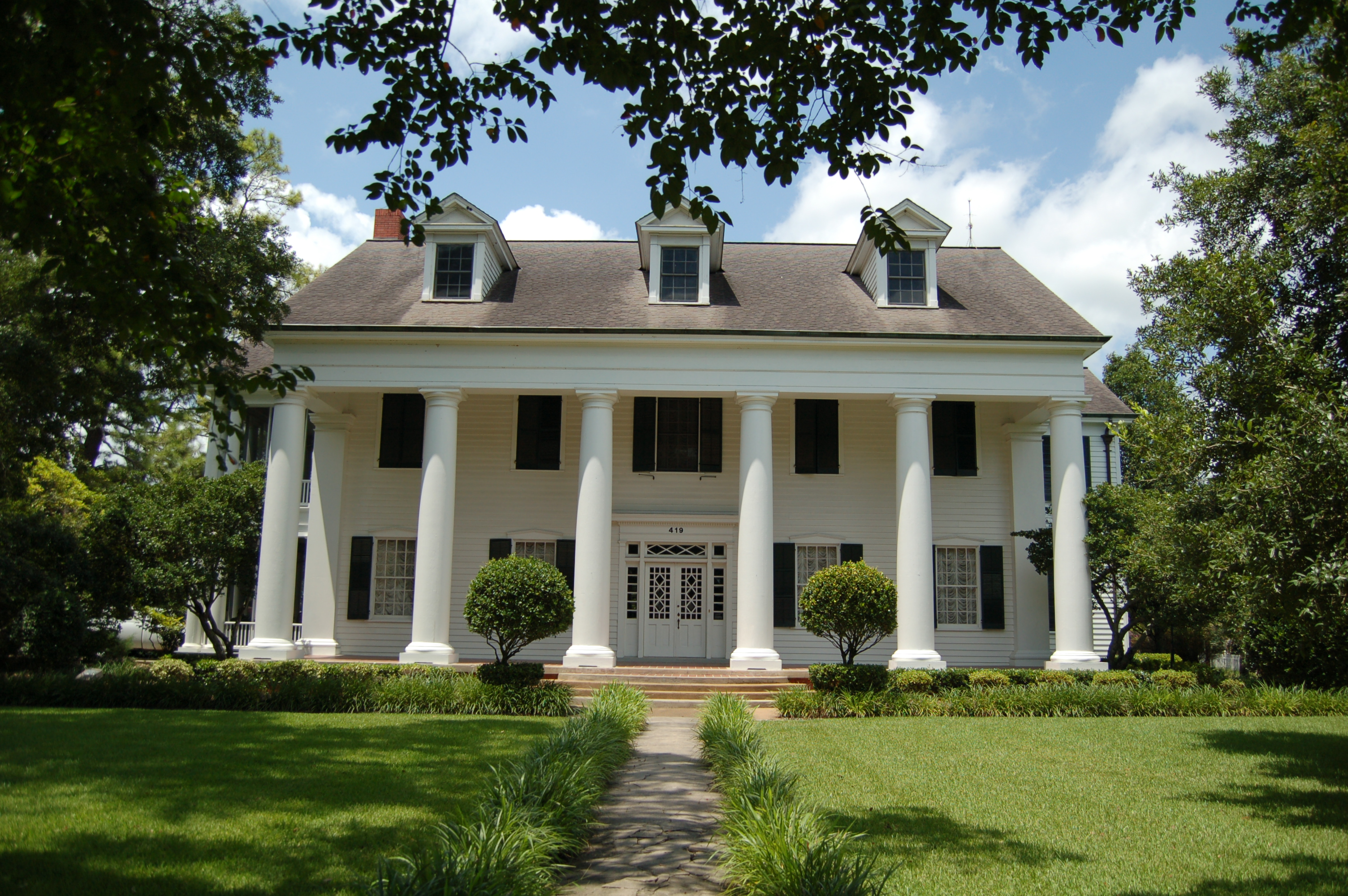

- Location within Louisiana Location within the United States
- Location: 437 N. Court St., Opelousas, Louisiana
- Coordinates: 30°32′16″N 92°04′58″W
- Area: 2 acres (0.81 ha)
- Built: 1927 (main house) c. 1915 (carriage house)
- Built by: Homer Ventre
- Architect: Herman Duncan
- Architectural style: Colonial Revival
- NRHP reference No.: 97000059
- Added to NRHP: February 14, 1997

The Edward Benjamin Dubuisson House, at 437 N. Court St. in Opelousas, Louisiana, was built in 1927. It was listed on the National Register of Historic Places in 1997.

It is described as a "large two story frame residence built in a distinctly southern version of the Colonial Revival style." It was designed by architect Herman Duncan and built by Homer Ventre.

The listing included a second contributing building, a carriage house which is older than the main house, built around 1915.
