= Centenary College of Louisiana at Jackson =

- Centenary College
- U.S. National Register of Historic Places
- U.S. Historic district – Contributing property
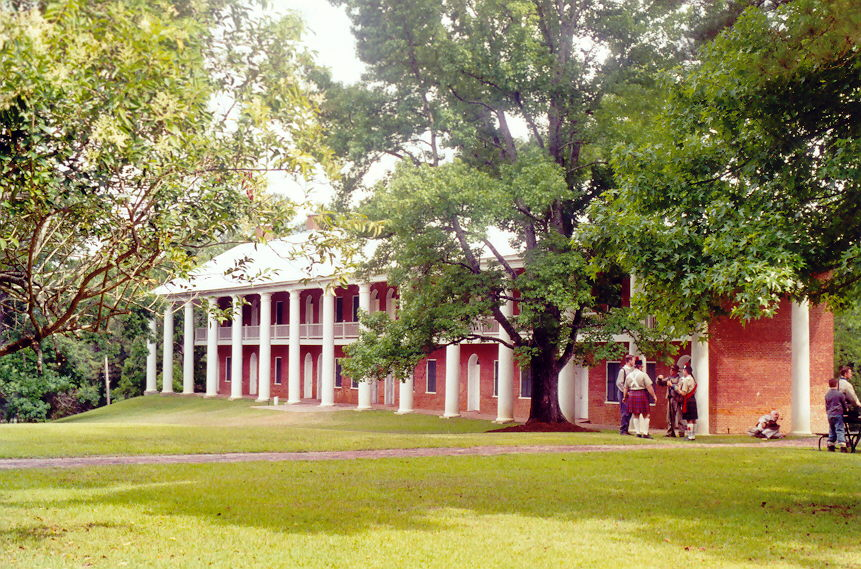
- The West Wing Dormitory, as seen today

- Location within Louisiana Location within the United States
- Location: Along College Street, Jackson, Louisiana
- Coordinates: 30°50′33″N 91°12′41″W
- Area: 40 acres (16 ha)
- Built: 1837
- Architect: Delafield
- Architectural style: Greek Revival
- Part of: Jackson Historic District (ID80001722)
- NRHP reference No.: 79001062

Significant dates
- Added to NRHP: April 19, 1979
- Designated CP: December 4, 1980

The original campus of Centenary College of Louisiana is located along College Street in Jackson, Louisiana. It is operated and preserved as a museum by the Louisiana Office of State Parks as the Centenary State Historic Site, offering educational interpretive programs and guided tours.

The 40 acres (16 ha) area comprising the West Wing and the Professor's Cottage was added as Centenary College to the National Register of Historic Places on April 19, 1979. The area was also included in the Jackson Historic District since its creation on December 4, 1980.

The Centenary State Historic Site is run by the Louisiana Office of State Parks.

== See also ==
- Jackson Historic District
- National Register of Historic Places listings in East Feliciana Parish, Louisiana
- List of Louisiana state historic sites
