= Clear Creek AME Church =

Historic church in Louisiana, United States

- U.S. National Register of Historic Places
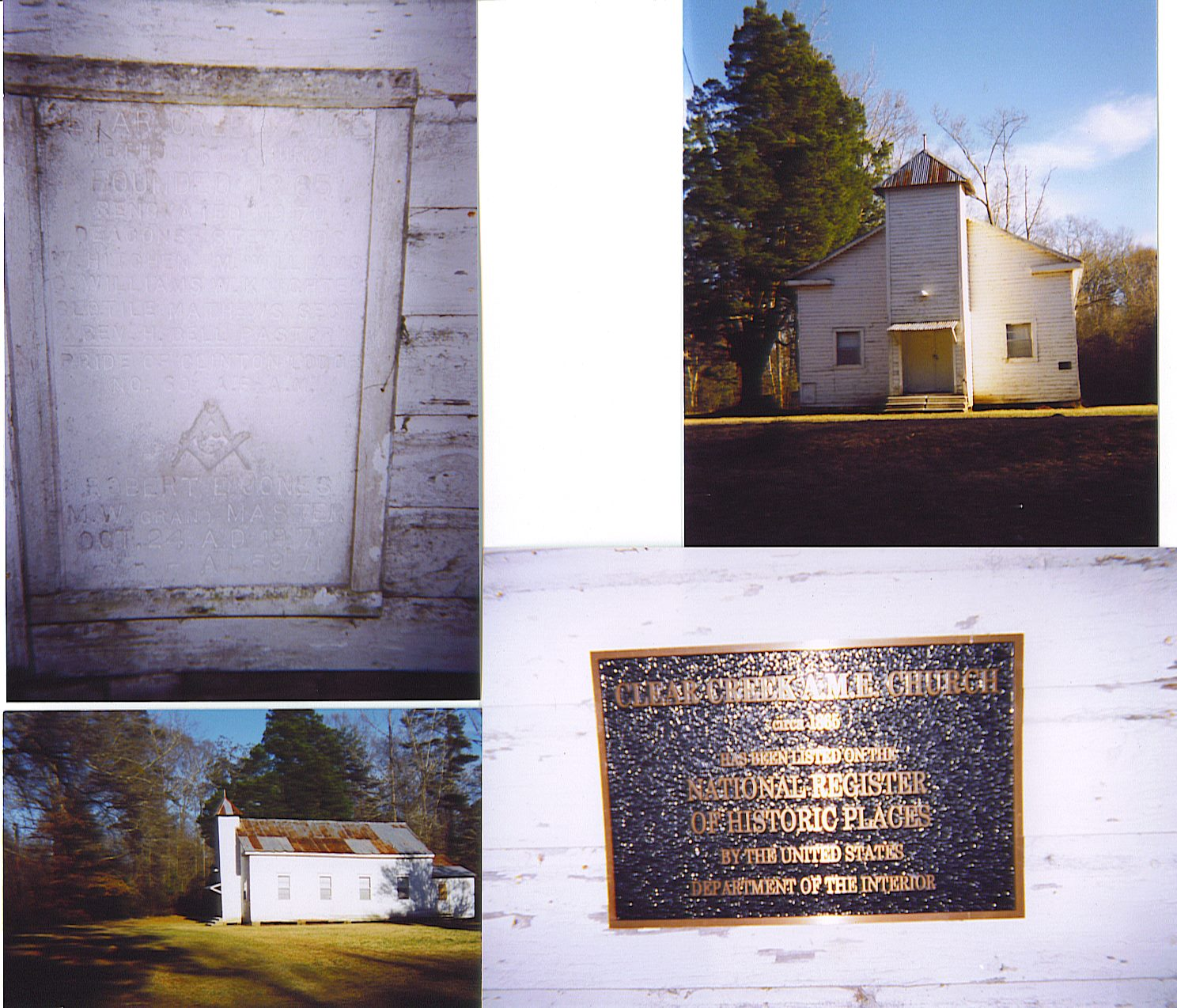

- Location within Louisiana Location within the United States
- Location: Along LA 961, about 0.37 miles (0.60 km) south of Felixville
- Nearest city: Felixville, Louisiana
- Coordinates: 30°56′13″N 90°52′38″W
- Area: 1.2 acres (0.49 ha)
- Built: c.1915 to c.1925
- NRHP reference No.: 02000269
- Added to NRHP: March 28, 2002

Clear Creek AME Church, also known as Clear Creek School, is a historic African Methodist Episcopal church located about 0.37 miles (0.60 km) south of Felixville, Louisiana.

The modest wood building dates back to an uncertain period between c.1915 and c.1925, and, as was typical in Louisiana, served also as a school. The congregation was founded in 1865, and the land upon which the church was built was donated in 1872 by Miss Margaret Collingsworth and Mrs. M. E. Hodges for "church and school purposes". It is not known exactly when the building ceased to be used as a school, while AME services continued to be held in the building until 1998.

The building was added to the National Register of Historic Places on March 28, 2002.

== See also ==
- St. Andrew's Episcopal Church: also in East Feliciana Parish
- National Register of Historic Places listings in East Feliciana Parish, Louisiana
