= Masonic Building (Alexandria, Louisiana) =

- U.S. National Register of Historic Places
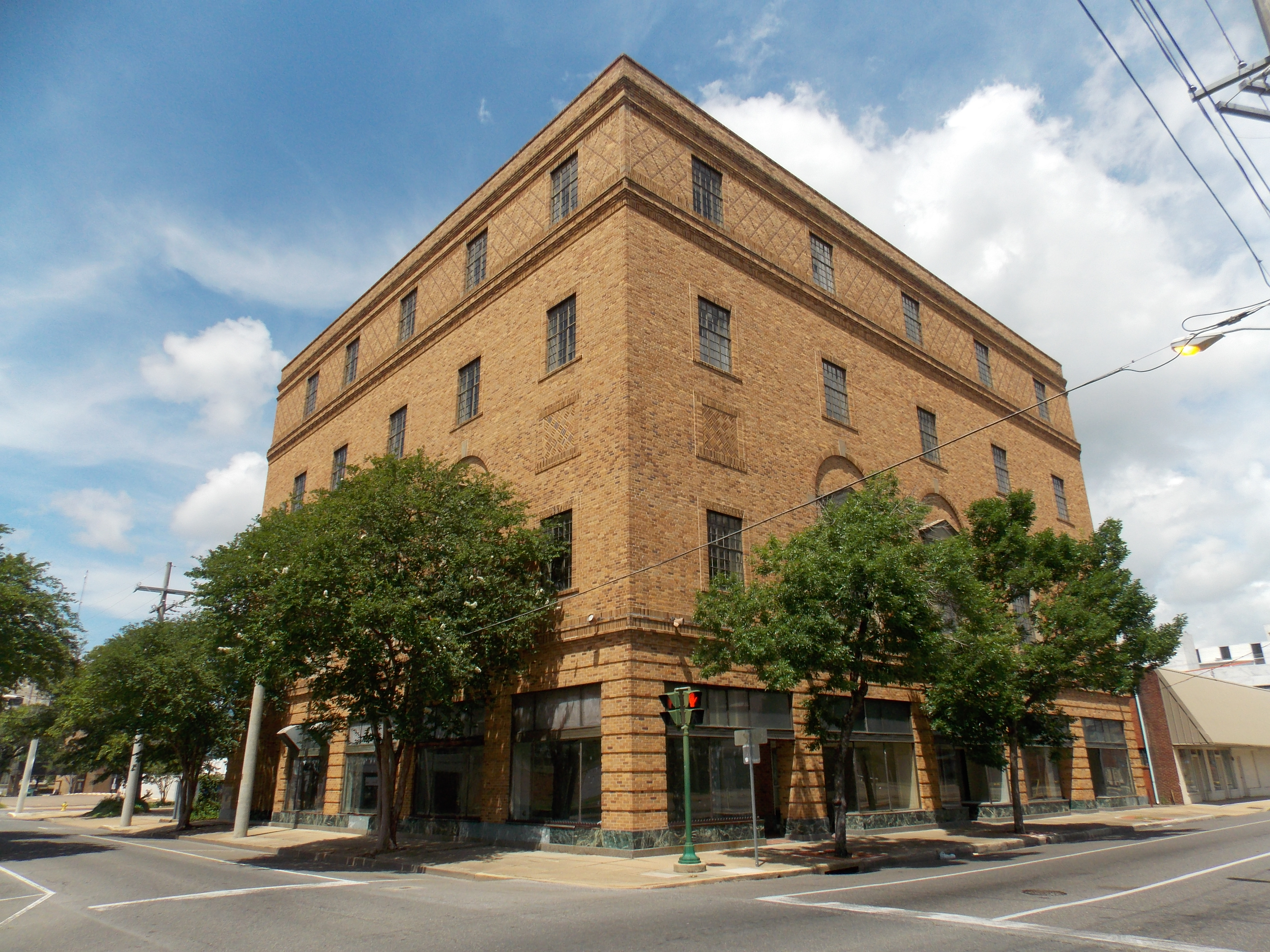

- Location within Louisiana Location within the United States
- Location: Fourth and Johnston Sts., Alexandria, Louisiana
- Coordinates: 31°18′36″N 92°26′42″W
- Area: 0.3 acres (0.12 ha)
- Built: 1927
- Architect: Herman J. Duncan
- Architectural style: Classical Revival
- NRHP reference No.: 86000079
- Added to NRHP: January 16, 1986

The Masonic Building in Alexandria, Louisiana, United States, was built in 1927. It was added to the National Register of Historic Places on January 16, 1986.

It was designed by local architect Herman J. Duncan, of Sam Stone, Jr., & Co. It was deemed "significant for its styling on the Fourth and Johnston Street facades. The two are almost identical. Both feature an elegant piano nobile with the central three windows enclosed by pedimented frames and inscribed within round arches, The top story is encompassed by a deepened frieze with diapered brickwork in contrasting colors. The Johnston and Fourth Street facades also each feature a pair of diapered brick panels on the second level."
