= Scouting in Louisiana =

- Cub Scout Pack 221 in Madisonville, La.

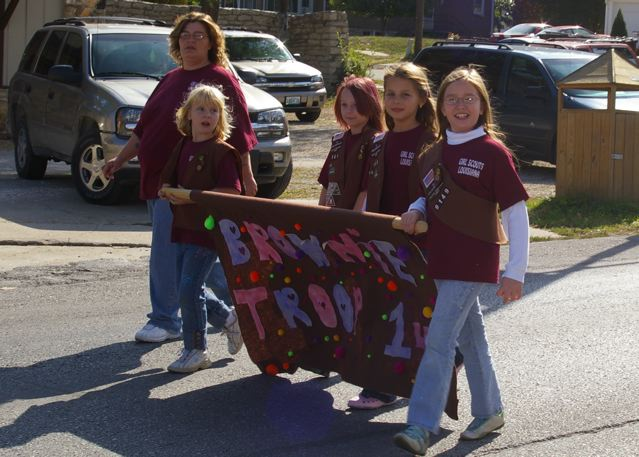
- Louisiana Girl Scouts in the LHS Homecoming Parade

Scouting in Louisiana has a long history, from the 1910s to the present day, serving thousands of youth in programs that suit the environment in which they live.

== Early history (1910–1960) ==
The first Boy Scouts of America (BSA) Troop in Louisiana was founded in 1910 in Monroe, LA by Isaac Cowden. The group of boys had formed the year before as "The Newsboy's Club" and met Sundays in the Knights of Pythias Hall on St. John Street. This troop was among the first in the south. The first Scout Master to be commissioned in Louisiana was Osee W. Zeagler.

In the days of segregation, five of the seven Louisiana councils maintained a separate summer camp for Negro scouts and the other two ran a special session at the regular council camp in order that black scouts would not be denied a camping program. In the period 1957–1967, each of the "Negro Scout Camps" were closed and the regular councils camps were integrated. Negro camps in Louisiana were: Camp Pioneer (Norwela Council), Camp Britton (Ouachita Valley Council), Camp Chenier (Evangeline Area Council), Indian Village Scout Camp (New Orleans Area Council), and Camp Carver (Istrouma Area Council).

In 1924, the Evangeline Area Council (#212) was formed. In 1917, the Minden Council was formed, ending in 1919. In 1917, the Ruston Council was formed, ending in 1918. In 1917, the Minden Council was formed, ending in 1919. In 1923, the Fourth District Council (#213) was formed, changing its name to the Ouachita Valley Council (#213) in 1925. In 1919, the Alexandria Council (#208) was formed, changing its name to the Attakapas Council (#208) in 1921. In 1923 the council changed its name to Rapides Parish Council (#208), and back to Attakapas (#208) in 1925. Attakapas (#208) dissolved in 1925, reforming in 1938. In 1917, the Baton Rouge Council (#211) was formed, changing its name to the East Baton Rouge Parish Council (#211) in 1922. It changed its name to the Istrouma Area Council (#211) in 1924. In 1924, the Old Hickory Area Council (#657) was formed, merging into the Istrouma Area Council (#211) in 1931.

In 1923, the Choctaw Area Council (#210) was formed. In 1919, the Calcasieu Parish Council (#209) was formed, changing its name to the Lake Charles Council (#209) in 1920. It changed its name to the Calcasieu Parish Council (#209) in 1922. In 1925, Calcasieu Parish changed its name to the Calcasieu and Cameron Parishes Council (#209). In 1930, the Choctaw Area (#210) and Calcasieu and Cameron Parishes (#209) councils merged to form the Calcasieu Area Council (#209).

In 1917, the Minden Council was formed, ending in 1919. In 1924, the Mississippi-Gulf Coast Area Council (#666) was formed, merging into the New Orleans Area Council (#214) in 1927.

In 1916, the New Orleans Council (#214) was formed, changing its name to the New Orleans Area Council (#214) in 1927. In 1925, the ClaiBienWeb Council (#699) was formed. In 1921, the Shreveport Council (#215) was formed, changing its name to the NorWeLa Area Council (#215) in 1923. The ClaiBienWeb Council merged into the NorWeLa Area Council (#215) in 1923.

== Recent history (1960–2010) ==
The Louisiana Purchase Council was formed from 2003 the merger between the Ouachita Valley and Attakapas councils. In 1999, the New Orleans Area Council (#214) changed its name to the Southeast Louisiana Council (#214).

== Boy Scouts of America Today ==
=== Louisiana Purchase Council ===
Louisiana Purchase Council (#213)
- Headquarters: Monroe, Louisiana
- Country: United States
- Founded: 2003
- Website; Louisiana Purchase Council

The Louisiana Purchase Council serves 20 parishes in Northeast and Central Louisiana. Parishes include: Allen, Avoyelles, Caldwell, Catahoula, Concordia, East Carroll, Franklin, Grant, Jackson, LaSalle, Lincoln, Madison, Morehouse, Ouachita, Rapides, Richland, Tensas, Union, West Carroll, and Winn.

==== History ====
In 1917, the Ruston Council was formed, ending in 1918. In 1923, the Fourth District Council (#213) was formed, changing its name to the Ouachita Valley Council (#213) in 1925. In 1919, the Alexandria Council (#208) was formed, changing its name to the Attakapas Council (#208) in 1921. In 1923 the council changed its name to Rapides Parish Council (#208), and back to Attakapas (#208) in 1925. Attakapas (#208) dissolved in 1925, reforming in 1938.

The council was formed from 2003 the merger between the Ouachita Valley (#213) and Attakapas (#208) councils to serve Scouts in Northeast and Central Louisiana.

==== Organization ====
- Pioneer District: Ouachita, Morehouse, East Carroll, West Carroll, Richland and Madison Parishes.
- Thunderbird District: Union, Lincoln, Jackson, and Winn Parishes.
- Attakapas District: Allen, Avoyelles, Catahoula, Concordia, Grant, LaSalle, and Rapides Parishes.

==== Camps ====
- Camp T.L. James - near Downsville, Louisiana.
- Camp Attakapas - approximately 35 miles NE of Alexandria, near Jena.

==== Order of the Arrow ====
- Comanche Lodge 254

=== Calcasieu Area Council ===
Calcasieu Area Council (#209)
- Headquarters: Lake Charles, Louisiana
- Country: United States
- Founded: 2003
- Website; Calcasieu Area Council

The Calcasieu Area Council serves youth in five Parishes of Southwest Louisiana.

==== History ====
In 1919, the Calcasieu Parish Council (#209) was formed, changing its name to the Lake Charles Council (#209) in 1920. It changed its name to the Calcasieu Parish Council (#209) in 1922. In 1925, Calcasieu Parish changed its name to the Calcasieu and Cameron Parishes Council (#209). In 1930, the Choctaw Area (#210, formed in 1923)and Calcasieu and Cameron Parishes (#209) councils merged to form the Calcasieu Area Council (#209).

==== Organization ====
The council is divided into two districts: South District serves Jefferson Davis Parish, Calcasieu Parish, and Cameron Parish, with the North District serving Allen Parish, Beauregard Parish, and Vernon Parish.

==== Camps ====
The council's Camp is Camp Edgewood, located near DeQuincy, Louisiana.

==== Order of the Arrow ====
- Quelqueshoe Lodge 166

=== Evangeline Area Council ===
Evangeline Area Council (#212)
- Headquarters: Lafayette, Louisiana
- Country: United States
- Founded: 1924
- President: Brian Thompson
- Council Commissioner: Kristopher O'Neal
- Scout Executive: Mike Beer
- Website; Evangeline Area Council

The Evangeline Area Council (#212) serves Scouts in Acadia, Evangeline, Lafayette, Iberia St. Landry, St. Martin, St. Mary and Vermilion parishes.

==== History ====
The Evangeline Area Council was founded in April 1924 by F.E. "Pa" Davis and various other business and community leaders from Lafayette, New Iberia, Abbeville, Crowley, Franklin, Opelousas, and a handful of other small towns. Davis served as the council's first President from 1924 to 1928. H.F. Cotey served as the council's first Scout Executive from 1924 to 1927.

The council territory included the parishes of Acadia, Evangeline, Iberia, Lafayette, Lafourche, Iberville, St. Landry, St. Mary, St. Martin, Terrebonne and Vermilion. The parishes of Iberville, Lafourche and Terrebonne were turned over to the New Orleans and Baton Rouge councils in 1928.

In 1966, the Atchafalaya Lodge of the Order of the Arrow was established in the Evangeline Area Council.

In 2024, the Evangeline Area Council celebrated its centennial year, having served the Acadiana area under the same organization name for 100 years.

==== Organization ====
- Bon Temps District
- Kuna Nisha District

==== Camps ====
- Mountain Bayou Scout Camp
- Camp Brownell
- Camp Steen
- Camp Thistlethwaite

==== Order of the Arrow ====
- Atchafalaya Lodge

=== Istrouma Area Council ===
Istrouma Area Council (#211)
- Headquarters: Baton Rouge, Louisiana
- Founded: 1917
- Website www.iacbsa.org

Istrouma Area Council serves Scouts in 14 parishes in Louisiana (Ascension, Assumption, East Baton Rouge, East Feliciana, Iberville, Livingston, Pointe Coupee, St. Helena, St. James, St. Tammany, Tangipahoa, Washington, West Feliciana and West Baton Rouge). The council is divided into two service areas - Capital Service Area and Northshore Service Area.

Camps

Avondale Scout Reservation- 1,700 acre reservation located in Clinton, LA. The reservation is divided into 4 camps- Camp Avondale (summer camp area), Woodbadge Hill (primitive camping), Camp Tigator (Council Training Center) and Camp McGee (Cub Scouts). The property has three lakes (Lake Istrouma, Lake Tigator, and Lake McGee) and frontage on Sandy Creek.

Carruth Scout Preserve- 150 acre property in Port Allen, La. Home to primitive camping.

Order of the Arrow

Quinipissa Lodge

=== Norwela Council ===
Norwela Council (#215)
- Headquarters: Shreveport, Louisiana
- Website; Norwela Council

The Norwela Council of the BSA was established in 1923. It serves a nine-parish region: Bienville, Bossier, Caddo, Claiborne, DeSoto, Natchitoches, Red River, Sabine, and Webster.

==== History ====
In 1925, the ClaiBienWeb Council (#699) was formed. In 1921, the Shreveport Council (#215) was formed, changing its name to the NorWeLa Area Council (#215) in 1923. The ClaiBienWeb Council merged into the NorWeLa Area Council (#215) in 1923.

==== Organization ====
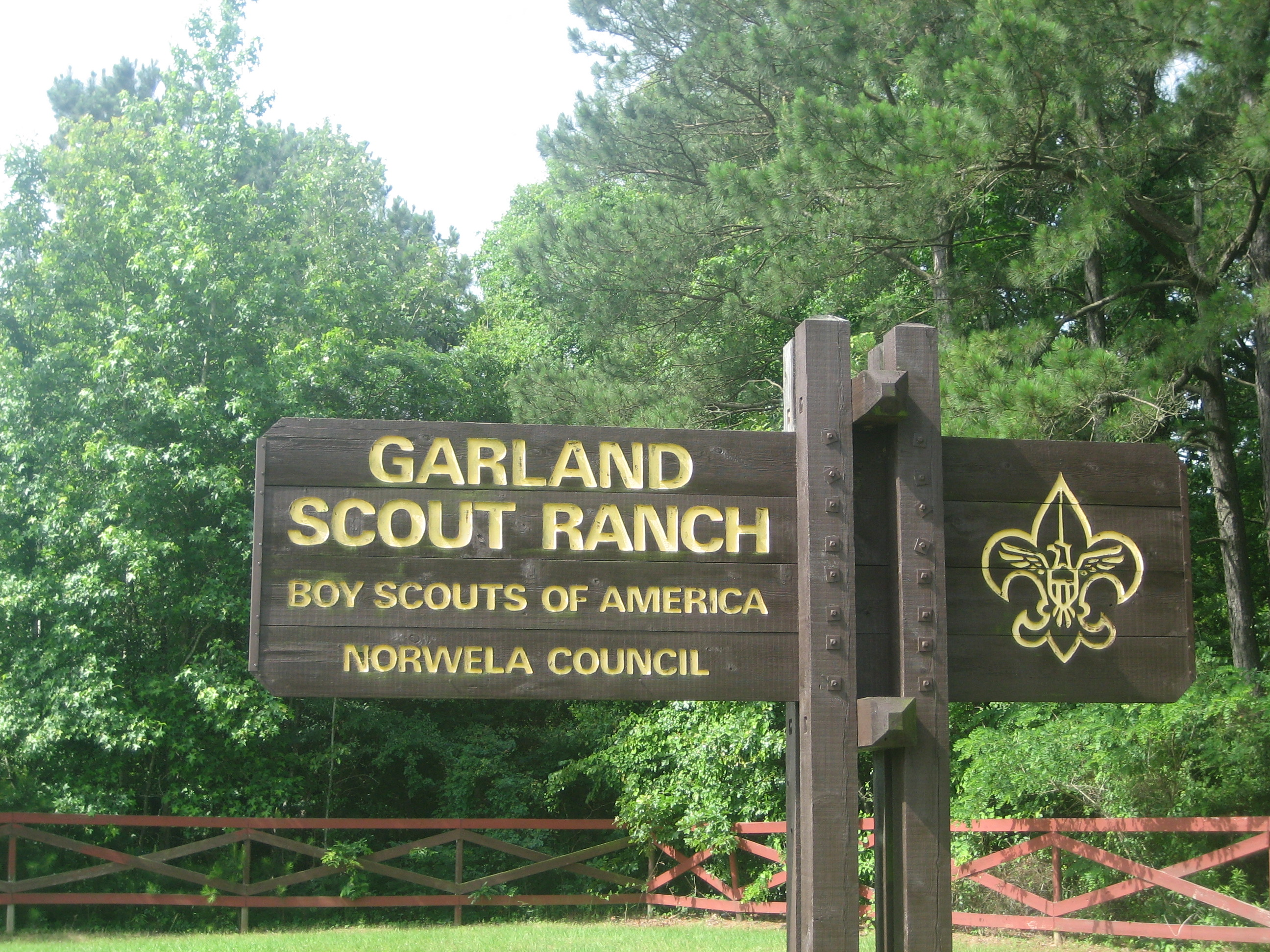
Entrance to Garland Scout Ranch

- Neshota District
- Netami District
- Yatasi District
- Cherokee District

==== Camp ====
- Kinsey Scout Reservation, south of Stonewall (fka Garland Scout Camp)

==== Order of the Arrow ====
- Caddo Lodge

=== Southeast Louisiana Council ===
Southeast Louisiana Council (#214)
- Headquarters: Metairie, Louisiana
- Founded: 1927
- Website; Southeast Louisiana Council

The Southeast Louisiana Council serves the Southeast Louisiana Parishes of Jefferson, Lafourche, Orleans, Plaquemine, St. John the Baptist, St. Bernard, St. Charles, East St. Tammany, and Terrebonne.

==== History ====
In 1917, the Minden Council was formed, ending in 1919. In 1924, the Mississippi-Gulf Coast Area Council (#666) was formed, merging into the New Orleans Area Council (#214) in 1927.

In 1916, the New Orleans Council (#214) was formed, changing its name to the New Orleans Area Council (#214) in 1927. It kept the name until 1999, when it changed to Southeast Louisiana Council.

==== Organization ====
- Bayou District
- Cataouatche District
- Cypress District
- Emerging Markets District
- Fleur de Lis District
- Pelican District

==== Order of the Arrow ====
- Chilantakoba Lodge

Before the devastation of Hurricane Katrina, Chilantakoba Lodge was the largest Order of the Arrow lodge in its section. The membership peaked around 600 but, following the storm, fell to nearly 100. The council's camp, and much of the area it serves, was impacted severely. There were downed trees, damaged buildings, destroyed trails, and loss of many other assets on the council's property. Members of Chilantakoba Lodge helped in the resurrection of the Council Camp, Salmen Scout Reservation, and helped to staff the summer program, putting on three weeks of Boy Scout summer camp. It is this level of dedication, and desire to serve, that has caused Chilantakoba Lodge to produce five Lodge Chiefs who have later gone on to receive the Distinguished Service Award, the highest award for service to the Order.

== Girl Scouting in Louisiana ==
Girl Scouting in Louisiana
- Map of Girl Scout Council in Louisiana

Two Girl Scout Councils serve Louisiana.

=== Girl Scouts Louisiana East ===
Girl Scouts Louisiana East serves some 16,000 girls in 23 parishes. It was formed by the merger of Girl Scout Council of Southeast Louisiana and Girl Scouts-Audubon Council in April 2008.

Headquarters
New Orleans, Louisiana
Website: www.gsle.org;
Service Center

- Baton Rouge, LA

Camps

- Camp Marydale is 400 acres (1.6 km^{2}) in St. Francisville, LA
- Camp Whispering Pines is 600 acres (2.4 km^{2}) in Independence, LA. It includes a 23-acre (93,000 m^{2}) lake.
- Camp Covington is 23 acres (93,000 m^{2}) in Covington, LA. It was founded in 1927.
- McFadden Cabin is located in City Park (New Orleans)

=== Girl Scouts of Louisiana - Pines to the Gulf ===
It was formed by the merger of Bayou Girl Scout Council, Central Louisiana Girl Scout Council, Inc., Girl Scouts Pelican Council, and Girl Scouts Silver Waters Council in January 2008.

Headquarters
Lafayette, Louisiana
Website
www.girlscoutspinestogulf.org

Camps

- Camp Bon Temps is 106 acres (0.43 km^{2}) in Breaux Bridge, Louisiana
- Camp Wawbansee is 140 acres (0.57 km^{2}) in Arcadia, Louisiana
- Camp Indian Creek is in Chatham, Louisiana

== Baden-Powell Service Association ==
There is one Baden-Powell Service Association local group in Louisiana, the 39th Cypress Scouts located in New Orleans.

== See also ==
- Southern Region (Boy Scouts of America)
