= 1938 Clinton High School =

- U.S. National Register of Historic Places
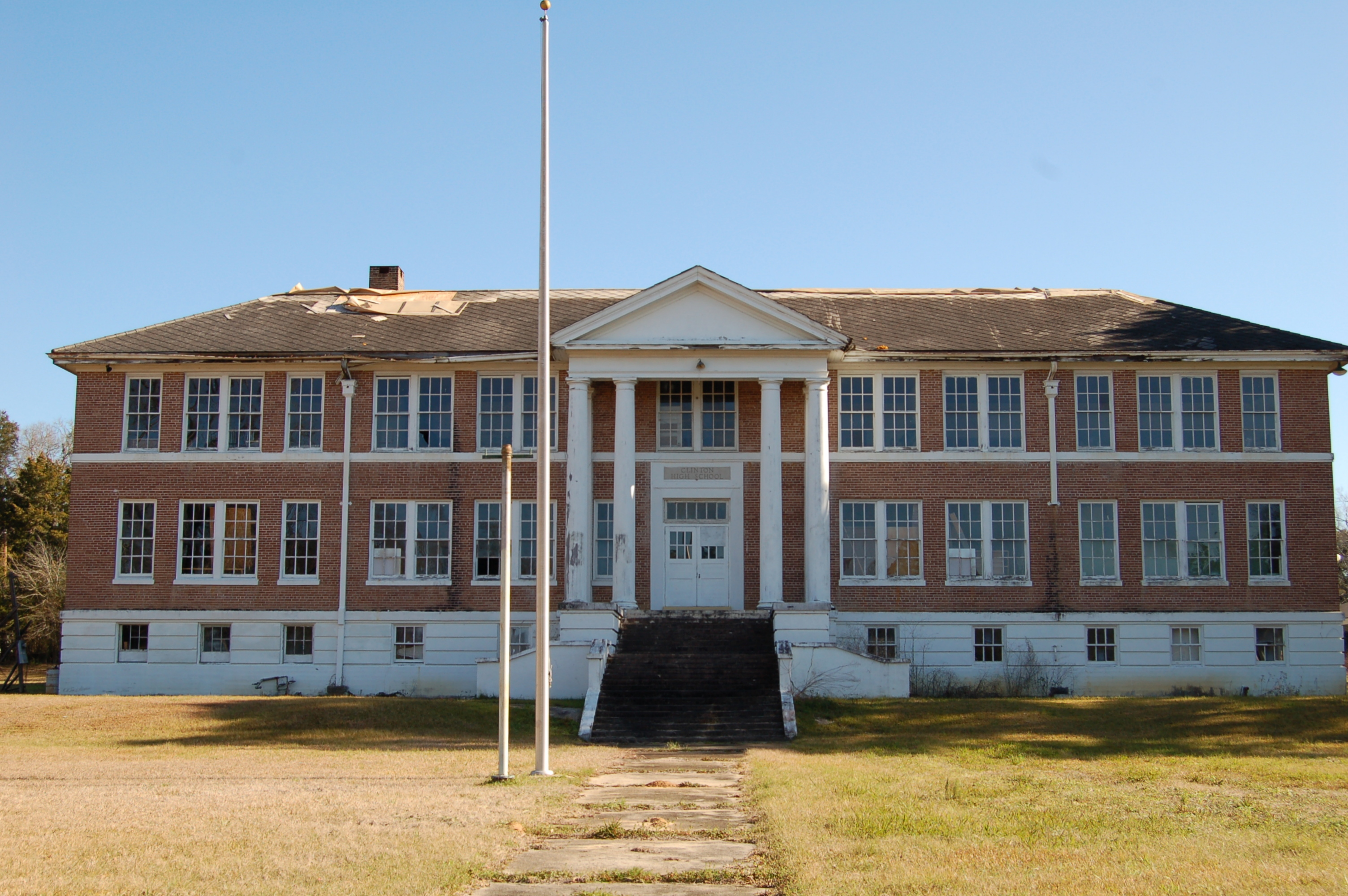

- Location within Louisiana
- Location: 12525 Cedar, Clinton, Louisiana
- Coordinates: 30°51′45″N 91°00′50″W
- Area: less than one acre
- Built: 1938
- Built by: W.M. Bozeman
- Architect: Herman J. Duncan
- Architectural style: Classical Revival
- NRHP reference No.: 05000506
- Added to NRHP: June 1, 2005

The 1938 Clinton High School, in Clinton, Louisiana, at 12525 Cedar, was built in 1938. It was designed by architect Herman J. Duncan. It was listed on the National Register of Historic Places in 2005.

It is Classical Revival in style.

It was deemed "significant in the area of social history because it served as the focus of Clinton's community life from its opening in 1938 until 1955, the present fifty year cutoff. Once school consolidation began in East Feliciana in the 1940s, the school played a similar role in the lives of most parish residents."
