= Jackson Historic District (Jackson, Louisiana) =

Historic district in Louisiana, United States

- U.S. National Register of Historic Places
- U.S. Historic district
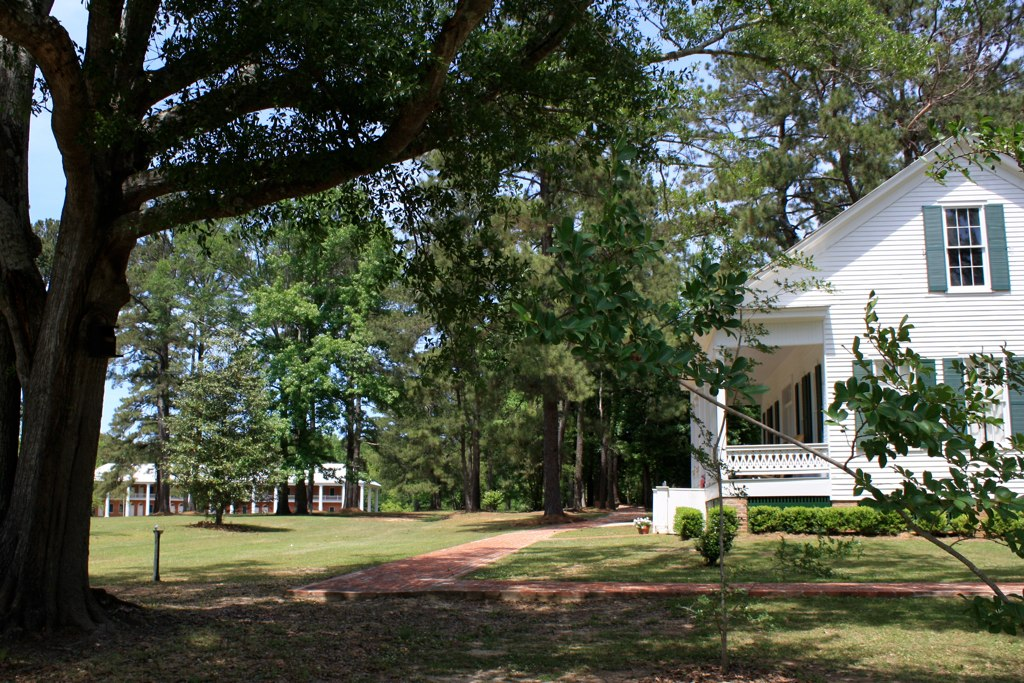

- Location within Louisiana Location within the United States
- Location: Roughly bounded by College Street, LA 952, Horton Street and Race Street, Jackson, Louisiana
- Coordinates: 30°50′21″N 91°12′56″W
- Area: 135 acres (55 ha)
- Architectural style: Early Commercial, Greek Revival, Late Victorian
- NRHP reference No.: 80001722
- Added to NRHP: December 4, 1980

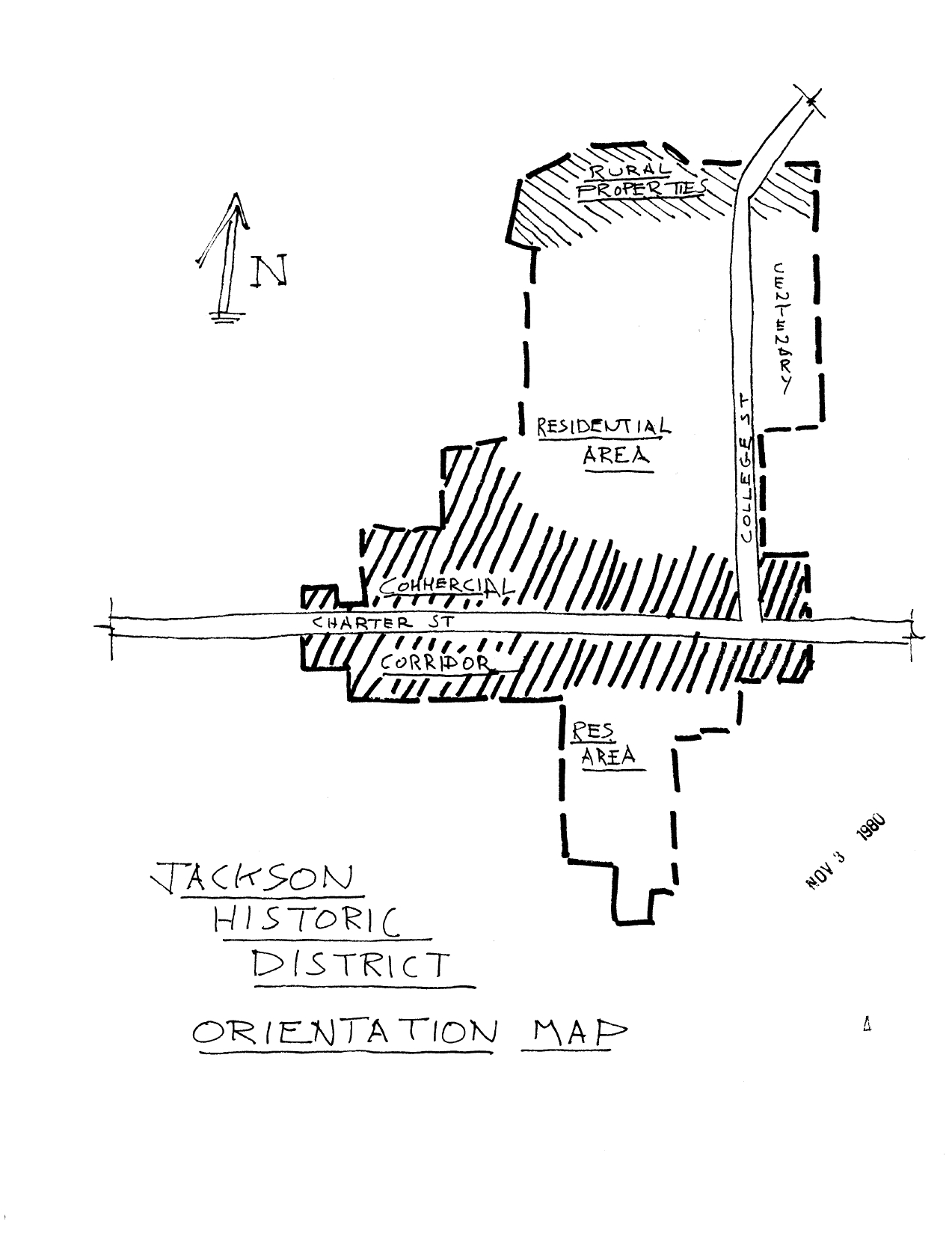
Map of the Jackson Historic District.

Jackson Historic District in Jackson, Louisiana, is a historic district roughly bounded by College Street, LA 952, Horton Street and Race Street.

It was deemed significant as a "surviving rural town center from the nineteenth and early twentieth centuries with banks, shops, residences, churches, warehouses and all manner of other buildings which might be expected in such a town.... But the historic area of Jackson is superior to most historic town centers because it is unusually well-preserved."

The district included 124 structures. Of these, 29 buildings (24 percent) are Federal or Greek Revival built from 1815 to 1845. Ten buildings (8 percent) are of a period spanning from 1845 to 1875, and includes three churches and a few late Greek Revival houses. For 1875 to 1910, there are 15 buildings (13 percent), including Late Victorian and Queen Anne styles. For 1910 to c.1930 there are 43 buildings (35 percent). Twenty buildings (24 percent) are intrusions.

The 135 acres (55 ha) area was listed on the National Register of Historic Places on December 4, 1980. It includes the Centenary College which was individually listed on the National Register of Historic Places on April 19, 1979.

== See also ==
- Centenary College of Louisiana at Jackson
- National Register of Historic Places listings in East Feliciana Parish, Louisiana
