= Lane Plantation =

Historic house in Louisiana, United States

- U.S. National Register of Historic Places
- Location within Louisiana Location within the United States
- Location: 7635 Lane Road, about 3.2 miles (5.1 km) northeast of Ethel
- Nearest city: Ethel, Louisiana
- Coordinates: 30°48′32″N 91°04′54″W
- Area: 335 acres (136 ha)
- Built: c.1818
- Architectural style: Federal, Carolina I
- NRHP reference No.: 93000322
- Added to NRHP: April 22, 1993

The Lane Plantation is a historic plantation located about 3.2 miles (5.1 km) northeast of Ethel, Louisiana East Feliciana Parish, Louisiana, USA.

The plantation, originally named Weston Place, (built c 1818 by Malachi Weston who had moved from South Carolina) was bought in 1849 by William Allen Lane from William Silliman who had purchased it in the last of a series of Sheriff’s sales after the heirs of Malachi Weston moved away around 1839. Prior to purchasing Weston Place, the Lane family (starting in 1835) resided in a home called Redwood exactly one mile west where Lane and his brother in law Thomas Lathrop Andrews operated a cotton plantation of approximately 600 acres. The property has remained then in the Lane family ever since.

A 335 acres (136 ha) area is owned by descendants of the Lane family, the Plauché family. (The surrounding land also remains owned by other Lane family heirs) 10 acres (4.0 ha) of the property consists of the Lane Plantation House, also known as Weston Place, was listed on the National Register of Historic Places on April 22, 1993. It also contains a barn, tennis court, pond, outdoor garden, as well as three other houses.

== See also ==
- List of plantations in Louisiana
- National Register of Historic Places listings in East Feliciana Parish, Louisiana
