= Sunset, Louisiana =

- Town
- Town of Sunset
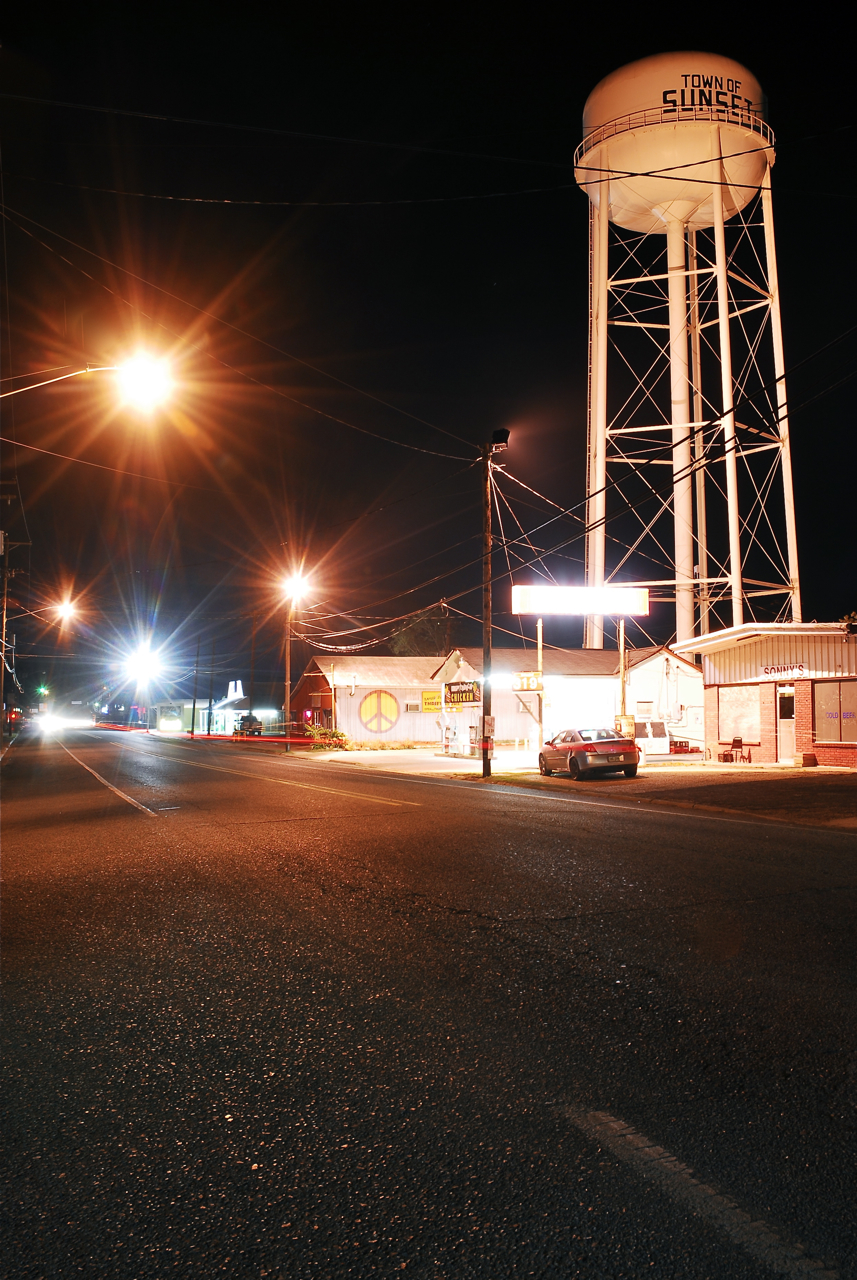
- "Downtown" Sunset in October of 2011
- Motto: "The best place to be"
- Location of Sunset in St. Landry Parish, Louisiana.

- Location of Louisiana in the United States
- Coordinates: 30°24′30″N 92°03′52″W
- Country: United States
- State: Louisiana
- Parish: St. Landry
- Founded: 1904

Area
  - Total: 3.25 sq mi (8.43 km^{2})
  - Land: 3.23 sq mi (8.36 km^{2})
  - Water: 0.027 sq mi (0.07 km^{2})
- Elevation: 46 ft (14 m)

Population (2020)
  - Total: 2,909
  - Density: 901.5/sq mi (348.06/km^{2})
- Time zone: UTC-6 (CST)
  - Summer (DST): UTC-5 (CDT)
- Area code: 337
- FIPS code: 22-74060
- GNIS feature ID: 2406692
- Website: www.townofsunset.com

Sunset is a town in St. Landry Parish, Louisiana, United States. As of the 2020 census, Sunset had a population of 2,909. It is part of the Opelousas–Eunice Micropolitan Statistical Area.

== Geography ==
According to the United States Census Bureau, the town has a total area of 3.1 square miles (8.1 km^{2}), of which 3.1 square miles (8.1 km^{2}) is land and 0.04 square mile (0.1 km^{2}) (0.96%) is water.

== Demographics ==
Historical population
Census	Pop.	Note	%±
1910	377		—
1920	433		14.9%
1930	520		20.1%
1940	630		21.2%
1950	1,080		71.4%
1960	1,307		21.0%
1970	1,675		28.2%
1980	2,300		37.3%
1990	2,201		−4.3%
2000	2,352		6.9%
2010	2,897		23.2%
2020	2,909		0.4%
2025 (est.)	3,194	▲	9.8%
U.S. Decennial Census

=== 2020 census ===
Sunset racial composition
Race	Number	Percentage
White (non-Hispanic)	1,324	45.51%
Black or African American (non-Hispanic)	1,426	49.02%
Native American	6	0.21%
Asian	7	0.24%
Other/Mixed	89	3.06%
Hispanic or Latino	57	1.96%

As of the 2020 United States census, there were 2,909 people, 1,063 households, and 796 families residing in the town.

=== 2010 census ===
As of the census of 2010, there were 2,897 people, 1,129 households, and 787 families residing in the town. The population density was 934.5 inhabitants per square mile (360.8/km^{2}). There were 1,226 housing units at an average density of 395.5 per square mile (152.7/km^{2}). The racial makeup of the town was 46.8% White, 48.9% African American, 0.5% Native American, 0.1% Asian, 0.1% from other races, and 0.9% from two or more races. Hispanic or Latino of any race were 2.7% of the population.

There were 1,129 households, out of which 38.0% had children under the age of 18 living with them, 41.4% were married couples living together, 23.6% had a female householder with no husband present, and 30.3% were non-families. 25.8% of all households were made up of individuals, and 19.0% had someone living alone who was 65 years of age or older. The average household size was 2.57 and the average family size was 3.09.

In the town, the population was spread out, with 31.4% under the age of 18, 6.4% from 20 to 24, 25.1% from 25 to 44, 27.8% from 45 to 64, and 9.4% who were 65 years of age or older. The median age was 34.7 years. For every 100 females, there were 87.3 males. For every 100 females age 18 and over, there were 86.2 males.

As of the 2009 American Community Survey, the median income for a household in the town was $33,000, and the median income for a family was $62,708. Males had a median income of $59,375 versus $23,258 for females. The per capita income for the town was $20,901. About 10.6% of families and 18.3% of the population were below the poverty line, including 13.9% of those under age 18 and 39.4% of those age 65 or over.

== History ==
Like many towns in Southern Louisiana, Sunset began as a railroad town (for the out-distribution of cotton and sweet potatoes and the in-distribution of specialty goods), was incorporated in 1904, and had its first village meeting that December 7. Victor Hugo Sibille was the first mayor. As part of a large-scale conversion of arable land away from cotton (due to the mass-destruction from the cotton boll weevil) and toward sweet potatoes in the late 19th century, the city gave itself the nickname "Sweet Potato Capital of the Nation" at the turn of the 20th century. According to local lore, The Bank of Sunset was one of the very few that did not close throughout the Great Depression of 1929.

== See also ==
- Sunset High School
- Category:People from Sunset, Louisiana
