= Jackson, Louisiana =

- Town
- Town of Jackson
- Location of Jackson in East Feliciana Parish, Louisiana.

- Location of Louisiana in the United States
- Coordinates: 30°50′05″N 91°12′29″W
- Country: United States
- State: Louisiana
- Parish: East Feliciana
- Named for: Andrew Jackson

Government
  - Type: Strong Mayor - Council
  - Mayor: Dane Brown

Area
  - Total: 4.47 sq mi (11.58 km^{2})
  - Land: 4.46 sq mi (11.56 km^{2})
  - Water: 0.0077 sq mi (0.02 km^{2})
- Elevation: 194 ft (59 m)

Population (2020)
  - Total: 3,990
  - Density: 893.7/sq mi (345.07/km^{2})
- Time zone: UTC-6 (CST)
  - Summer (DST): UTC-5 (CDT)
- ZIP code: 70748
- Area code: 225
- FIPS code: 22-37830
- GNIS feature ID: 2405899
- Website: townofjackson.myruralwater.com

Jackson is a town in East Feliciana Parish, Louisiana, United States. The population was 3,842 at the 2010 U.S. census, down from 4,130 in 2000; the 2020 population estimates program determined Jackson had a population of 3,707. It is part of the Baton Rouge metropolitan statistical area.

== History ==
The town of Jackson was founded in 1815 as the seat of justice for Feliciana Parish before the parish was divided into East and West. The town was a major commercial center and a center for education, earning it the title "Athens of the South". Legend holds that the town was originally called "Bear Corners" for the many wild black bears crossing nearby Thompson Creek, and that it eventually took its name from General Andrew Jackson, who reportedly camped there with his troops on the return trip north after the 1815 Battle of New Orleans.

Jackson was the parish seat only until 1824, when Feliciana Parish was split into two parishes, with Clinton selected as the new seat of government in East Feliciana.

Jackson was the location of the College of Louisiana from 1825 until 1845, and then the Methodist-affiliated Centenary College from 1845 until 1908, when it relocated to Shreveport.

The East Louisiana State Hospital was founded in Jackson in 1847.

== Geography ==
Jackson is located on the western edge of East Feliciana Parish. The town's western border is Thompson Creek, which is also the border with West Feliciana Parish. Louisiana Highway 10 passes through Jackson, leading east 12 miles (19 km) to Clinton and west 12 miles to St. Francisville overlooking the Mississippi River.

According to the United States Census Bureau, Jackson has a total area of 4.5 square miles (11.6 km^{2}), of which 0.01 square miles (0.02 km^{2}), or 0.15%, is water.

== Demographics ==
Historical population
Census	Pop.	Note	%±
1870	934		—
1880	880		−5.8%
1890	1,276		45.0%
1900	2,012		57.7%
1910	2,146		6.7%
1920	2,320		8.1%
1930	3,966		70.9%
1940	5,384		35.8%
1950	6,772		25.8%
1960	1,824		−73.1%
1970	4,697		157.5%
1980	3,878		−17.4%
1990	3,891		0.3%
2000	4,130		6.1%
2010	3,842		−7.0%
2020	3,990		3.9%
2025 (est.)	3,904	▼	−2.2%
U.S. Decennial Census

Jackson racial composition as of 2020
Race	Number	Percentage
White (non-Hispanic)	2,432	60.95%
Black or African American (non-Hispanic)	1,265	31.7%
Native American	21	0.53%
Asian	7	0.18%
Pacific Islander	4	0.1%
Other/Mixed	102	2.56%
Hispanic or Latino	159	3.98%

At the 2000 United States census, there were 4,130 people, 841 households, and 596 families residing in the town. The population density was 924.2 inhabitants per square mile (356.8/km^{2}). There were 992 housing units at an average density of 222.0 per square mile (85.7/km^{2}). At the 2020 population estimates program, 3,707 people lived in the town. By the 2020 United States census, there were 3,990 people, 750 households, and 488 families residing in the town.

In 2000, the racial makeup of the town was 46.56% White, 52.30% African American, 0.15% Native American, 0.39% Asian, 0.07% from other races, and 0.53% from two or more races. Hispanic or Latino of any race were 0.34% of the population. In 2019, 37.3% of the population were White, 59.9% Black and African American, 1.2% Asian, 0.6% some other race, and 1.1% two or more races.

According to the 2000 U.S. census, were 841 households, out of which 33.5% had children under the age of 18 living with them, 44.8% were married couples living together, 21.6% had a female householder with no husband present, and 29.1% were non-families. 26.9% of all households were made up of individuals, and 10.2% had someone living alone who was 65 years of age or older. The average household size was 2.54 and the average family size was 3.08.

In the town, the population was spread out, with 15.1% under the age of 18, 12.0% from 18 to 24, 44.5% from 25 to 44, 22.0% from 45 to 64, and 6.5% who were 65 years of age or older. The median age was 36 years. For every 100 females, there were 226.0 males. For every 100 females age 18 and over, there were 264.7 males.

The median income for a household in the town was $27,455, and the median income for a family was $32,450. Males had a median income of $20,917 versus $17,896 for females. The per capita income for the town was $12,039. About 18.7% of families and 27.2% of the population were below the poverty line, including 27.8% of those under age 18 and 20.2% of those age 65 or over. The 2019 American community Survey estimated the median household income was $34,063.

== Arts and culture ==
The Republic of West Florida Historical Museum has its 3 ft (914 mm) Narrow-gauge railway. Other points of interest include the Centenary College of Louisiana at Jackson.

== Education ==
=== Colleges and universities ===
A branch of Baton Rouge Community College is presently located in Jackson.

=== Primary and secondary schools ===
East Feliciana Parish School Board serves Jackson.

Schools within Jackson include:

- East Feliciana High School
- Jackson Elementary School

== Government and infrastructure ==
The Louisiana Department of Public Safety and Corrections operates the Dixon Correctional Institute in Jackson.

== Notable people ==
- Kendell Beckwith, linebacker for NFL's Tampa Bay Buccaneers
- Danny Johnson, cornerback for NFL's Washington Commanders
- John Welch Jones, M. D. (1826–1916) medical doctor and Civil War cavalry officer
- Junius Wallace Jones, major general of the United States Air Force
- Eddie Robinson, football coach in College Football Hall of Fame
- Merriell Shelton, U.S. Marine Corps Corporal featured in The Pacific

== See also ==
- List of towns in Louisiana
- Jackson Historic District
