= Clinton, Louisiana =

- Town
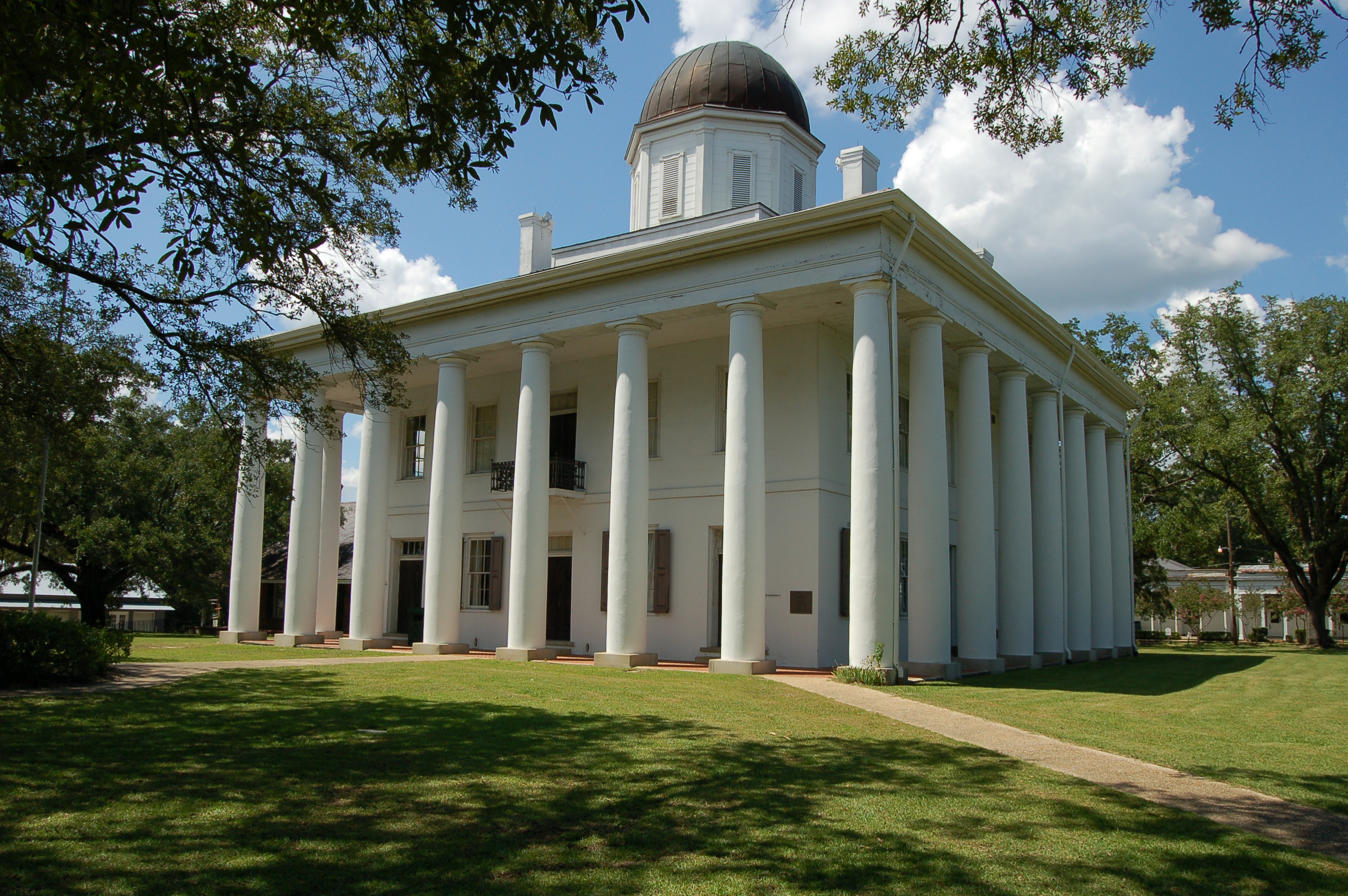
- East Feliciana Courthouse in Clinton

- Location of Clinton in East Feliciana Parish, Louisiana.

- Location of Louisiana in the United States
- Coordinates: 30°52′13″N 91°00′52″W
- Country: United States
- State: Louisiana
- Parish: East Feliciana

Area
  - Total: 2.76 sq mi (7.14 km^{2})
  - Land: 2.74 sq mi (7.10 km^{2})
  - Water: 0.015 sq mi (0.04 km^{2})
- Elevation: 226 ft (69 m)

Population (2020)
  - Total: 1,340
  - Density: 489.1/sq mi (188.83/km^{2})
- Time zone: UTC-6 (CST)
  - Summer (DST): UTC-5 (CDT)
- Zip Code: 70722
- Area code: 225
- FIPS code: 22-15990
- GNIS feature ID: 2406280
- Website: www.townofclintonla.com

Clinton is a town in, and the parish seat of, East Feliciana Parish, Louisiana, United States. The town was named for New York Governor DeWitt Clinton. The population was 1,340 in 2020. It is part of the Baton Rouge metropolitan statistical area.

== History ==
In 1824, when Feliciana Parish was split into East and West, Clinton became the seat of East Feliciana Parish's government, replacing the town of Jackson in this capacity.

In mid October 1948, an Air Force transport plane with 34 people aboard made a forced landing near the town, killing four.

== Geography ==
According to the United States Census Bureau, the town has a total area of 2.8 square miles (7.3 km^{2}), of which 2.7 square miles (7.0 km^{2}) is land and 0.04 square miles (0.10 km^{2}) (0.72%) is water.

=== Climate ===
Climate data for Clinton, Louisiana (1991–2020 normals, extremes 1975–2019)
Month	Jan	Feb	Mar	Apr	May	Jun	Jul	Aug	Sep	Oct	Nov	Dec	Year
Record high °F (°C)	81 (27)	87 (31)	89 (32)	94 (34)	100 (38)	101 (38)	102 (39)	106 (41)	104 (40)	98 (37)	90 (32)	84 (29)	106 (41)
Mean daily maximum °F (°C)	60.1 (15.6)	64.6 (18.1)	70.7 (21.5)	76.8 (24.9)	83.3 (28.5)	88.5 (31.4)	90.1 (32.3)	90.2 (32.3)	86.9 (30.5)	78.9 (26.1)	69.0 (20.6)	62.3 (16.8)	76.8 (24.9)
Daily mean °F (°C)	48.8 (9.3)	52.7 (11.5)	58.8 (14.9)	65.1 (18.4)	72.2 (22.3)	78.4 (25.8)	80.2 (26.8)	80.1 (26.7)	76.3 (24.6)	66.8 (19.3)	57.0 (13.9)	51.2 (10.7)	65.6 (18.7)
Mean daily minimum °F (°C)	37.6 (3.1)	40.9 (4.9)	46.9 (8.3)	53.4 (11.9)	61.0 (16.1)	68.2 (20.1)	70.4 (21.3)	70.1 (21.2)	65.8 (18.8)	54.8 (12.7)	45.1 (7.3)	40.2 (4.6)	54.5 (12.5)
Record low °F (°C)	6 (−14)	11 (−12)	18 (−8)	28 (−2)	37 (3)	48 (9)	55 (13)	57 (14)	43 (6)	28 (−2)	20 (−7)	1 (−17)	1 (−17)
Average precipitation inches (mm)	5.87 (149)	5.45 (138)	4.86 (123)	5.47 (139)	4.87 (124)	6.02 (153)	4.69 (119)	5.08 (129)	4.30 (109)	4.33 (110)	3.70 (94)	5.05 (128)	59.69 (1,516)
Average snowfall inches (cm)	0.0 (0.0)	0.0 (0.0)	0.0 (0.0)	0.0 (0.0)	0.0 (0.0)	0.0 (0.0)	0.0 (0.0)	0.0 (0.0)	0.0 (0.0)	0.0 (0.0)	0.0 (0.0)	0.0 (0.0)	0.0 (0.0)
Average precipitation days (≥ 0.01 in)	9.6	8.4	8.3	7.0	7.5	10.5	11.6	9.1	6.4	5.8	7.1	8.0	99.3
Average snowy days (≥ 0.1 in)	0.0	0.0	0.0	0.0	0.0	0.0	0.0	0.0	0.0	0.0	0.0	0.1	0.1
Source: NOAA

== Demographics ==
Historical population
Census	Pop.	Note	%±
1870	930		—
1880	1,129		21.4%
1890	974		−13.7%
1900	960		−1.4%
1910	918		−4.4%
1920	701		−23.6%
1930	702		0.1%
1940	998		42.2%
1950	1,383		38.6%
1960	1,568		13.4%
1970	1,884		20.2%
1980	1,919		1.9%
1990	1,904		−0.8%
2000	1,998		4.9%
2010	1,653		−17.3%
2020	1,340		−18.9%
2025 (est.)	1,265	▼	−5.6%
U.S. Decennial Census

=== Racial and ethnic composition ===
Clinton town, Louisiana – Racial and ethnic composition Note: the US Census treats Hispanic/Latino as an ethnic category. This table excludes Latinos from the racial categories and assigns them to a separate category. Hispanics/Latinos may be of any race.
Race / Ethnicity (NH = Non-Hispanic)	Pop 2000	Pop 2010	Pop 2020	% 2000	% 2010	% 2020
White alone (NH)	797	621	565	39.89%	37.57%	42.16%
Black or African American alone (NH)	1,150	972	709	57.56%	58.80%	52.91%
Native American or Alaska Native alone (NH)	1	5	1	0.05%	0.30%	0.07%
Asian alone (NH)	3	10	12	0.15%	0.60%	0.90%
Native Hawaiian or Pacific Islander alone (NH)	0	0	0	0.00%	0.00%	0.00%
Other race alone (NH)	1	0	1	0.05%	0.00%	0.07%
Mixed race or Multiracial (NH)	11	25	34	0.55%	1.51%	2.54%
Hispanic or Latino (any race)	35	20	18	1.75%	1.21%	1.34%
Total	1,998	1,653	1,340	100.00%	100.00%	100.00%

=== 2020 census ===
As of the 2020 United States census, there were 1,340 people, 737 households, and 506 families residing in the town.

=== 2000 census ===
As of the census of 2000, there were 1,998 people, 670 households, and 481 families residing in the town. The population density was 729.0 inhabitants per square mile (281.5/km^{2}). There were 771 housing units at an average density of 281.3 per square mile (108.6/km^{2}). The racial makeup of the town was 40.74% White, 58.26% African American, 0.05% Native American, 0.15% Asian, 0.10% from other races, and 0.70% from two or more races. Hispanic or Latino of any race were 1.75% of the population.

There were 670 households, out of which 34.3% had children under the age of 18 living with them, 41.2% were married couples living together, 26.1% had a female householder with no husband present, and 28.1% were non-families. 26.6% of all households were made up of individuals, and 11.9% had someone living alone who was 65 years of age or older. The average household size was 2.71 and the average family size was 3.30.

In the town, the population was spread out, with 30.0% under the age of 18, 9.0% from 18 to 24, 27.5% from 25 to 44, 21.8% from 45 to 64, and 11.7% who were 65 years of age or older. The median age was 34 years. For every 100 females, there were 96.1 males. For every 100 females age 18 and over, there were 91.1 males.

The median income for a household in the town was $27,016, and the median income for a family was $29,444. Males had a median income of $32,500 versus $20,268 for females. The per capita income for the town was $13,353. About 25.3% of families and 33.6% of the population were below the poverty line, including 44.6% of those under age 18 and 23.7% of those age 65 or over.

== Education ==
East Feliciana Parish School Board serves Clinton. Public schools within Clinton and serving Clinton include:

- Clinton High School
- Clinton Middle School
- Clinton Elementary School

This was changed in the Fall of 2010, when Clinton and Jackson High Schools merged to be housed at the old Jackson High/Middle School building in Jackson. Clinton Middle School was merged with Jackson Middle School and housed at the Clinton High School site.

Silliman Institute is the main private school in the area. Slaughter Community Charter School is the only charter school in the area.

== Notable people ==
- Shannon Dawson, college football coach
- John D. Travis, state representative for District 62 from 1984 to 2000
- Shalanda Young, director of the Office of Management and Budget

== Media ==
- The 2005 film The Dukes of Hazzard was filmed in and around Clinton.
- A 1972 made-for-TV movie, "Moon of the Wolf", was filmed in and around Clinton. Many scenes utilize the Courthouse square, the old hospital, the jail and homes in the area. This werewolf film starred David Janssen and Barbara Rush.
- The HBO hit series True Blood currently has a five-year contract with the town.
- The 2016 film The Free State of Jones was filmed partly in Clinton.
- The 1958 Martin Ritt drama The Long Hot Summer, starring Paul Newman, Joanne Woodward and Orson Welles, was filmed in Clinton. It was based on three works of William Faulkner.
