= St. Amant High School =

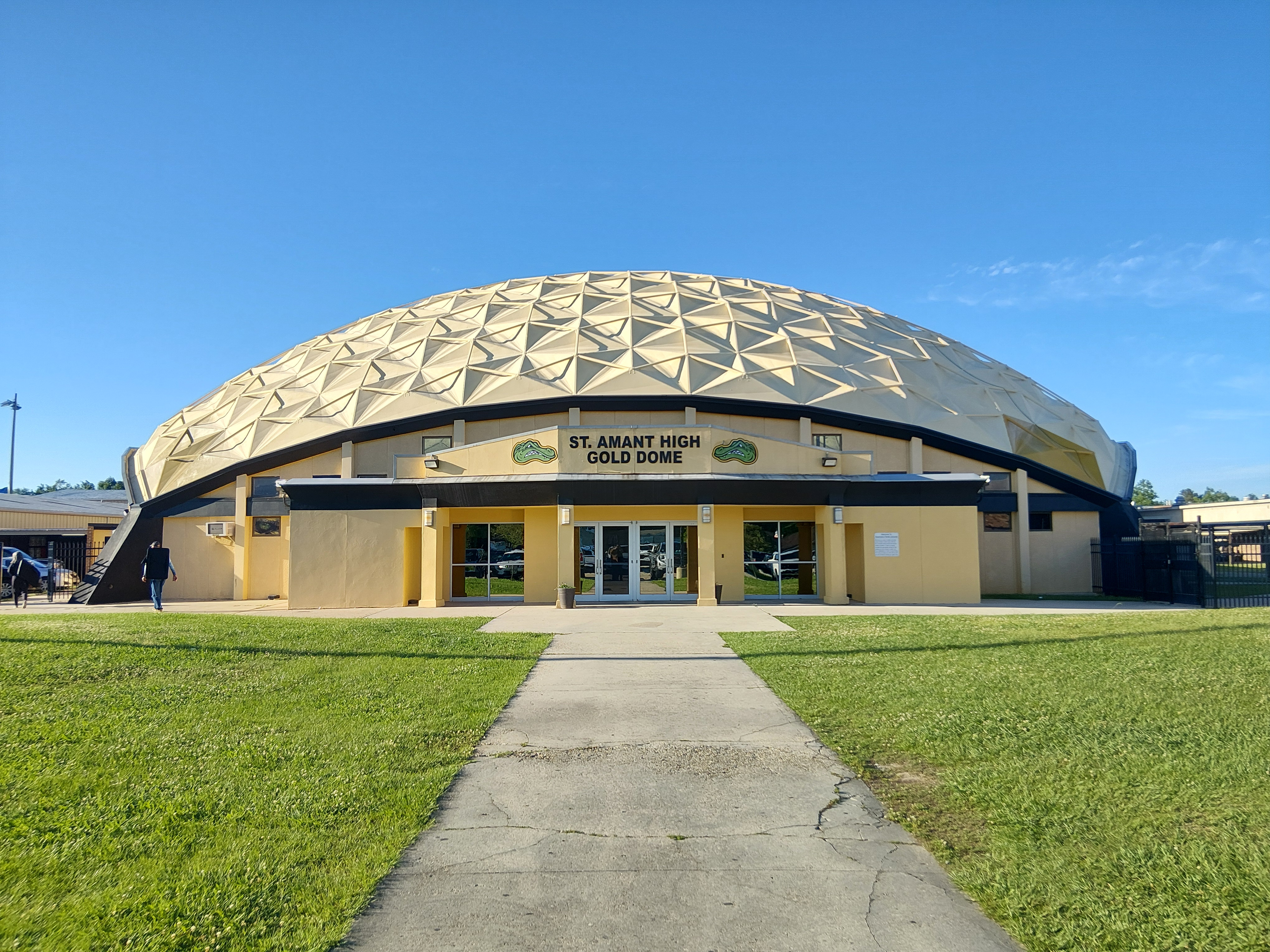
- St. Amant High Gold Dome

Location
- 12035 Hwy 431; St. Amant, LA 70774; United States; 30.2419°N 90.8720°W

Information
- Type: Public high school
- Motto: "Success Through Actions the STA Way" "We Can & We Will!" "Together We Can Do Anything!"
- Established: 1978
- School district: Ascension Parish School Board
- Principal: Christina Carter
- Staff: 152.15 (on an FTE basis)
- Grades: 9–12
- Age range: 13-20
- Enrollment: 1,661 (as of 2026-2027 school year)
- Student to teacher ratio: 15.99
- Colors: Black and Gold
- Mascot: Alligator
- Nickname: Gators
- Rivals: East Ascension Spartans; Baton Rouge Catholic Bears; Dutchtown Griffins Prairieville Hurricanes
- Website: School website

St. Amant High School is a high school located in unincorporated Ascension Parish, Louisiana, United States, in the Census-designated place of St. Amant. It is within the Ascension Parish School Board, one of five high schools operated by the APSB.

As of the 2025-2026 school year, the school has an enrollment of 2,364 students and 138.98 classroom teachers (on an FTE basis), for a student-teacher ratio of 17.35.

The school colors are black and gold and the school mascot is the alligator. The principal, as of 2023, is Christina Carter.

== Freshman Academy ==
The Freshman Academy at St. Amant High School was added and completed in 2016.

The new $14,078,000 66,000 square-foot facility, completed by Stuart & Company General Contractors, which features 28 classrooms, a new state-of-the-art cafeteria and theater will be part of the solution for getting St. Amant High back on its campus by February 13, 2017.

== Demographics ==
Ethnicity	STAHS	LA Avg
White	68%	49%
Black	19%	46%
Hispanic	9%	5%
Asian	<1%	1%
Native American	<1%	1%

== Athletics ==
St. Amant High athletics competes in the LHSAA. The Gators have competed in the LHSAA's highest classification since the 1983-84 school year (AAAA through 1990-91, 5A since 1991-92).

In 2022, the LHSAA redistricted Catholic with other schools from East Baton Rouge Parish, while St. Amant, East Ascension and Dutchtown were moved into a district with three high schools in Livingston Parish. Previously, the LHSAA used U.S. 190 as a dividing line for Class 5A districts in the Baton Rouge area.

St. Amant has brought home state championships across multiple sports, displaying the school’s historic athletic program.

Softball (9): 2002, 2003, 2004, 2005, 2006, 2019, 2022, 2023, 2024

Baseball (5): 1991, 1993, 1994, 1995, 2004

The Gator baseball program has also claimed state runner-up in 2001 and 2022.

Before the “new” St. Amant opened (1978), the school played as the “St. Amant Wildcats” where the football team made an appearance at the state championship in 1956, finishing as runner-up.

== Notable alumni ==
- Kim Batiste (1968–2020), Major League Baseball player for the Philadelphia Phillies (1991–1994) and San Francisco Giants (1996). Batiste was a member of the 1993 Phillies World Series team.
- Reid Brignac (born 1986), Major League baseball player
- Blayne Enlow (born 1999), baseball player
- Jason Garey (born 1984), All-American college soccer at the University of Maryland winning the 2005 Hermann Trophy as the best college player in his senior season. Led the Terrapins to the 2005 College Cup (NCAA national champions). Drafted by Columbus Crew in the first round (third overall) at the 2006 MLS SuperDraft, winning the MLS Cup in 2008.
- Butch Pierre (born 1962) is an assistant basketball coach for the Oklahoma State Cowboys and the former interim head coach of the Louisiana State University basketball
- Andy Sheets (born 1971), is a former shortstop in Major League Baseball who played for the Seattle Mariners (1996–1997), San Diego Padres (1998), Anaheim Angels (1999), Boston Red Sox (2000) and Tampa Bay Devil Rays (2001–2002). Sheets was a member of the 1998 Padres World Series team. Cousin of Ben Sheets (see below)
- Ben Sheets (born 1978), professional baseball player for the Atlanta Braves. Former teams included the Milwaukee Brewers and Oakland Athletics. He was a member of the 2000 Team USA Gold medal winning Olympic Baseball Team. Sheets is a four-time All-Star and was the N.L. starting pitcher for the 2008 All-Star game. Cousin of Andy Sheets (see above).
- Adarrial Smylie, former basketball player for Southern University
- Jason Williams, former Louisiana State University baseball standout and member of the 1996 Team USA Bronze medal winning Olympic Baseball team
- John "Hot Rod" Williams (1962–2015), former NBA basketball player selected by the Cleveland Cavaliers in the 1985 NBA draft with the 21st pick of the second round.
