= Duplessis =

Duplessis may refer to:

- Duplessis (surname)
  - Maurice Duplessis (1890–1959), the 16th premier of Quebec
    - Duplessis (TV series), a historical television series about Maurice Duplessis that aired in Québec in 1978
    - Duplessis Orphans scandal
- Duplessis (provincial electoral district), provincial electoral district in Quebec, Canada
- Duplessis, Louisiana, an unincorporated community in the United States

== See also ==
- Du Plessis (disambiguation)
