= John Lowry =

John Lowry may refer to:

- John Lowry (baseball) (fl. 1875), American professional baseball player
- John Lowry (Irish politician), general secretary of the Workers' Party
- John Lowry (Parliamentarian) (died 1669), English politician
- John Lowry (mathematician) (1769–1850), English mathematician
- John D. Lowry (1932–2012), Canadian film restoration expert and innovator
- John Lowry III, American executive, military veteran and federal official

== See also ==
- Jack Lowry (1916–2007), Australian rules footballer and cricketer
- John Lowery (disambiguation)
