= River Road African American Museum =

Museum in Donaldsonville, Louisiana

- RRAAM

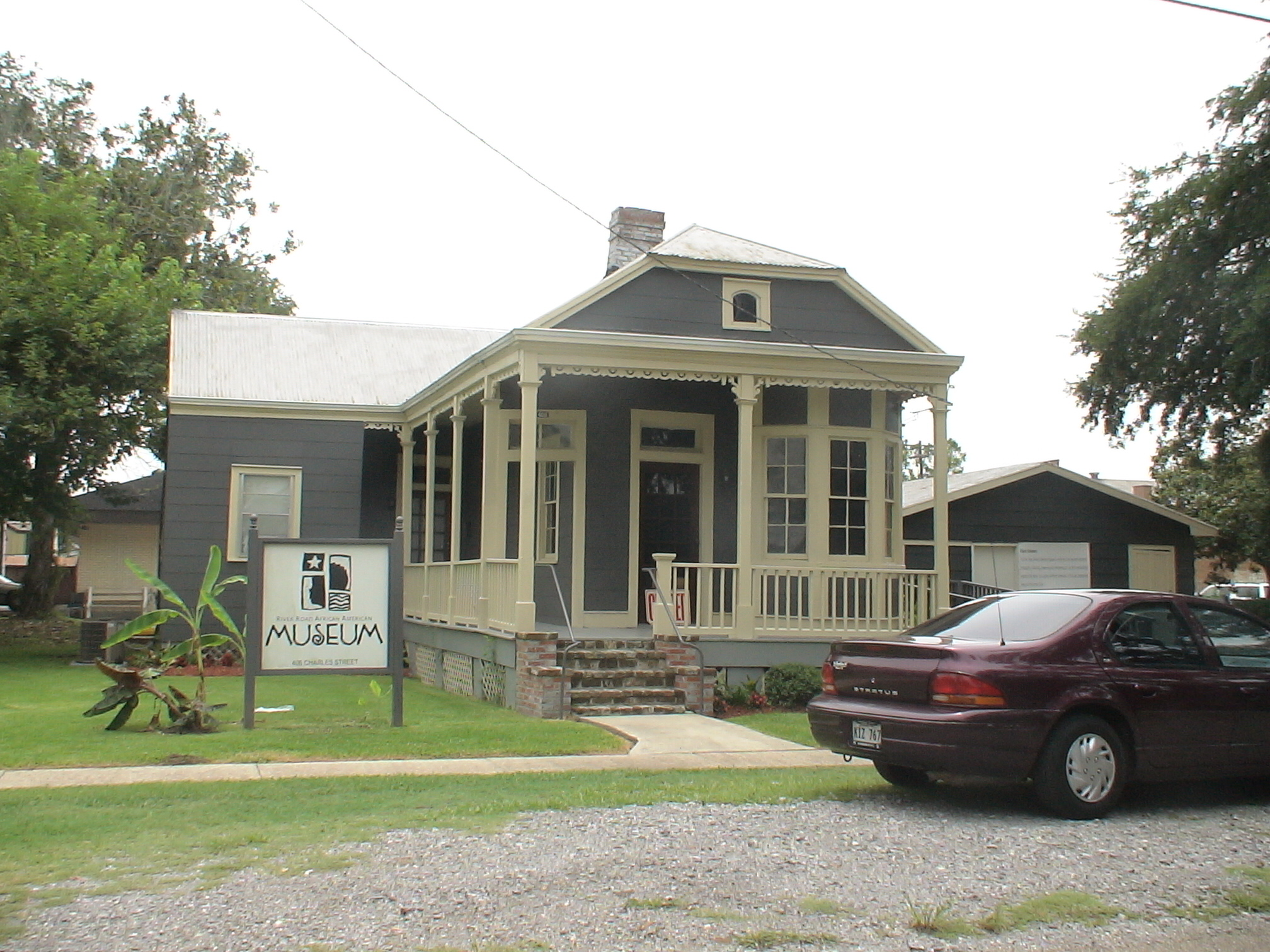
- One of the historic buildings in the complex
- Established: 1994
- Location: 406 Charles Street; Donaldsonville, Louisiana 70346
- Coordinates: 30.1013098°N 90.9927285°W
- Type: African-American history
- Key holdings: Great River Road-related
- Website: www.riverroadaam.org

River Road African American Museum is a museum of culture and history in Donaldsonville, Louisiana, United States. Founded in 1994, it was among the first Louisiana museums to tell the story of Africans and African Americans, both slave and free. The museum notes their contributions to the River Road region, both before and after the American Civil War. Because of its significance, the museum was identified as one of the first 26 sites included by the state in 2008 on the Louisiana African American Heritage Trail.

== History ==
The founder Kathe Hambrick created the African American Museum to celebrate the culture and contributions of African Americans in Louisiana, and to provide a more accurate historic account.

Hambrick began to work on the museum in 1991. Returning to Ascension Parish after years away, she noted that despite the tens of thousands of visitors that area plantations received, few were able to learn anything about the contributions of Africans and African Americans, whether slave or free. As late as the 1990s, after academic historians had been writing for more than a generation about black history and social histories, few of the plantations provided the histories of African Americans in the region, either before or after the Civil War. People of African descent had a 300-year history in the region and had contributed significantly to its economy and culture. In addition, many worked on the plantations that had continued to operate into the 20th century.

Hambrick originally established the museum in 1994 at notable Tezcuco Plantation. After it suffered a damaging fire in 2002, the plantation owners decided against rebuilding, and Hambrick had to find a new plantation house .

She relocated the River Road African American Museum to Donaldsonville, about 70 miles from New Orleans. The city has had a strong association with black history. In 1868 the city had elected Pierre Caliste Landry, an attorney and Methodist minister, as the first African-American mayor in the United States. Numerous slaves had escaped there to Union lines, and some fought with Union soldiers in the 1863 defense of Fort Butler. It is now listed on the National Register of Historic Places. After the war, freedmen left rural areas for Donaldsonville to gather in community and establish trades and businesses; it had the third-largest black population of any city in the state.

Hambrick was able to relocate buildings to the site which have historic significance in area history: the first black elementary school in Ascension Parish, the meeting house of an early African-American insurance agency, and the African Plantation house, owned by the first African-American doctor in the parish.

== Programs ==
The museum has developed exhibits about black inventors, jazz musicians, and community and political leaders from the area. Another exhibit was about the free people of color in the parish, developed from census and town records. The museum has a strong collection of artifacts and memorabilia from plantations along the River Road from New Orleans; some donated by the plantations; other material donated by individuals from their own families. It also hosts traveling exhibits from other venues, frequent educational programs and workshops in culture.

== See also ==
- List of museums in Louisiana
- List of museums focused on African Americans
