= Howard Green (American football) =

American football player (born 1979)

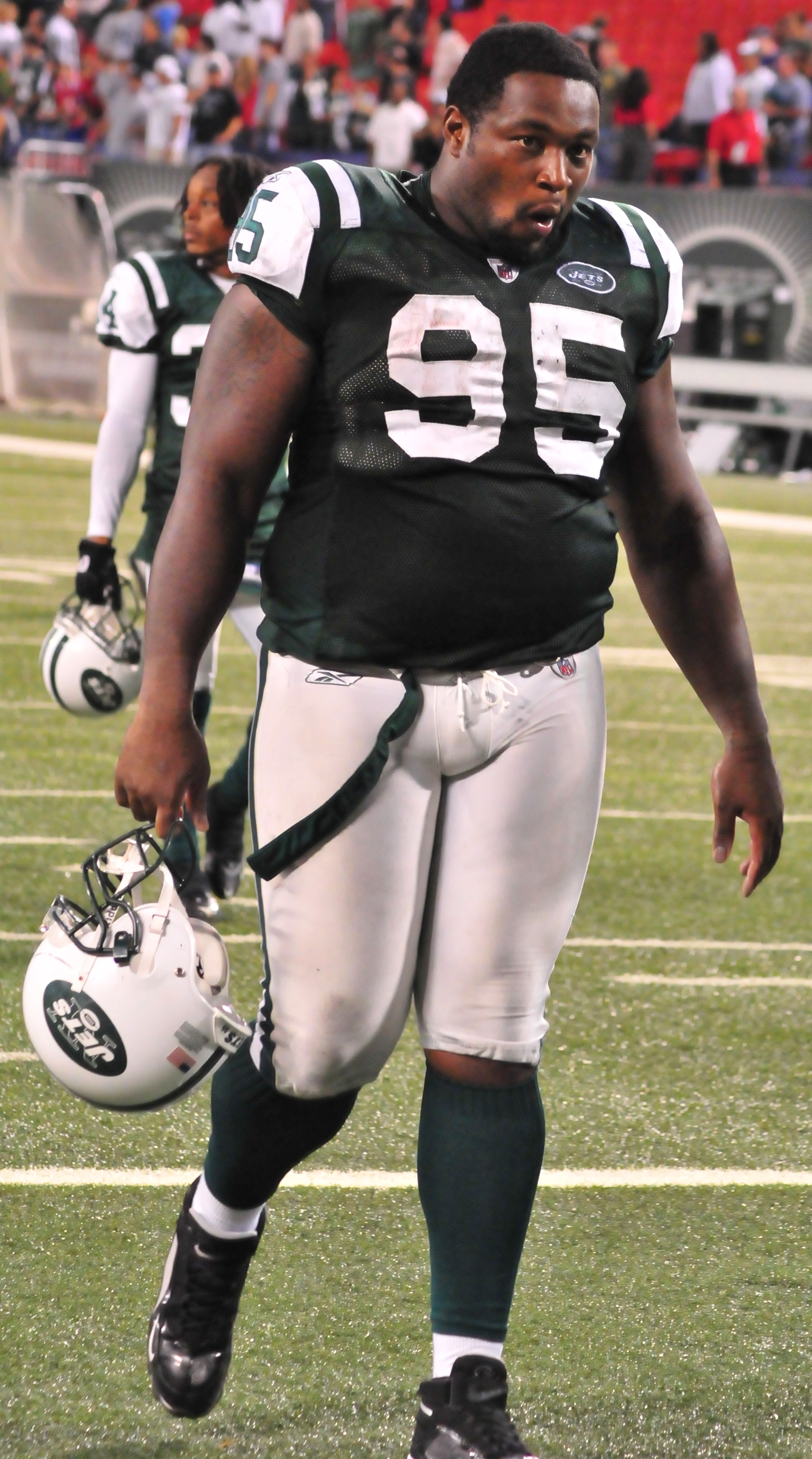
- Green with the New York Jets in 2009

No. 95, 94
- Position: Defensive tackle

Personal information
- Born: January 12, 1979 (age 47); Donaldsonville, Louisiana, U.S.
- Listed height: 6 ft 2 in (1.88 m)
- Listed weight: 340 lb (154 kg)

Career information
- High school: Donaldsonville
- College: Southwest Mississippi (1998–1999); LSU (2000–2001)
- NFL draft: 2002: 6th round, 190th overall pick

Career history
- Houston Texans (2002)*; Baltimore Ravens (2002); Houston Texans (2002); New Orleans Saints (2003–2004); Miami Dolphins (2006)*; Minnesota Vikings (2007)*; Seattle Seahawks (2007–2008); New York Jets (2009); Washington Redskins (2010)*; New York Jets (2010); Green Bay Packers (2010–2011)
- * Offseason or practice squad member only

Awards and highlights
- Super Bowl champion (XLV)

Career NFL statistics
- Total tackles: 99
- Sacks: 2
- Forced fumbles: 3
- Stats at Pro Football Reference

Howard Green Jr. (born January 12, 1979) is an American former professional football player who was a defensive tackle in the National Football League (NFL) from 2002 to 2011. He played college football at Southwest Mississippi Community College from 1998 to 1999 and then for the LSU Tigers from 2000 to 2001. He was selected by the Houston Texans in the sixth round of the 2002 NFL draft but was waived before the start of the 2002 season. Green played in the NFL for five teams: the Baltimore Ravens, New Orleans Saints, Seattle Seahawks, New York Jets, and Green Bay Packers, while also being an offseason member of the Miami Dolphins, Minnesota Vikings, and Washington Redskins, and spent time on the Texans active roster in 2002. In Super Bowl XLV against the Pittsburgh Steelers, which the Packers won 31–25, Green hit quarterback Ben Roethlisberger's arm, forcing an interception that was returned for a touchdown.

== Early life ==
Howard Green Jr. was born on January 12, 1979, in Donaldsonville, Louisiana. Green played high school football at Donaldsonville High School in Donaldsonville as a two-way lineman. He played every play in high school except for kickoffs and returns. As an offensive lineman his junior year in 1996, he earned Class 3A all-state honors and also recorded 72 tackles and eight sacks, earning an all-district mention on defense. Green accumulated 105 tackles and 10 sacks his senior year, garnering Class 3A all-state recognition. He also earned The Advocate All-Metro Small Schools, PrepStar Pre-season Dream Team, The Advocate Second Dozen, and Purple & Gold's Great Eight accolades during his high school career. He had a 370-pound bench press and 500-pound squat in high school as well.

== College career ==
Green first played college football at Southwest Mississippi Community College from 1998 to 1999. He transferred to Louisiana State University to play for the LSU Tigers from 2000 to 2001, where he majored in general studies and was a two-year letterman. He played in 10 games, starting 8, during the 2000 regular season, and played in the 2000 Peach Bowl as well. Green had 39 tackles (18 of which were solo), one sack and one fumble recovery that year. He recorded 38 tackles and three sacks his senior season in 2001.

== Professional career ==
=== 2002–2006 ===
Green was selected by the Houston Texans in the sixth round, with the 190th overall pick of the 2002 NFL draft. He officially signed with the team on June 20, 2002, but was waived on September 2, 2002, before the start of the regular season.

On September 3, 2002, Green was signed off waivers by the Baltimore Ravens and played in one game for the Ravens that season, recording no statistics, before being released on October 29, 2002.

Green was signed to the practice squad of the Texans on October 31, 2002, and was later promoted to the active roster on December 18, 2002. He became a free agent after the 2002 season. Green re-signed with the Texans on March 24, 2003. He was waived/injured on August 26 and reverted to injured reserve the next day before being waived by the Texans on August 29, 2003.

On September 30, 2003, Green was signed to the practice squad of the New Orleans Saints. He was promoted to the active roster on December 6, 2003, and played in four games for the Saints during the 2003 season, recording one pass breakup. He appeared in 14 games, starting a career-high 12 games, in 2004, totaling 18 solo tackles, 10 assisted tackles and one forced fumble. Green became a free agent after the season and re-signed with the Saints on March 9, 2005. He was waived by the Saints on September 2, 2005. Later in 2011, Green stated that he had "beat out" 2003 sixth overall pick Johnathan Sullivan in training camp but the Saints "wanted [Sullivan] to play" so Green was waived.

Green signed a reserve/future contract with the Miami Dolphins on January 5, 2006, and was waived by the Dolphins on August 29, 2006, before the start of the season.

=== 2007–2011 ===
Green was signed by the Minnesota Vikings on May 8, 2007, but was waived on September 1, 2007, before the start of the season.

On October 16, 2007, Green signed with the Seattle Seahawks and played in five games that season, accumulating four solo tackles and three assisted tackles. He also played in two playoff games, recording one solo tackle and two assisted tackles. In a preseason game on August 8, 2008, against the Vikings, Green had three tackles, two sacks, one quarterback hurry, one fumble recovery, one pass breakup, and a diving interception off of a deflected pass on the last play of the game. That season, he appeared in 13 games during the 2008 regular season, recording 17 solo tackles, four assisted tackles, one sack and one forced fumble.

Green signed with the New York Jets on March 16, 2009, was released on October 17, and re-signed on October 20. Overall, he played in 12 games in 2009, totaling 16 solo tackles and seven assisted tackles. He also appeared in two playoff games for the Jets that season, accumulating one solo tackle and two assisted tackles.

Green was signed to a one-year deal by the Washington Redskins on April 19, 2010. It was reported that he would compete for the starting job at nose tackle. However, Green was released from the Redskins on September 4, 2010, before the start of the season.

On September 15, 2010, following a season-ending injury to Kris Jenkins, the Jets re-signed Green to back up new starter Sione Pouha. Green was released on September 30 but re-signed on October 4. However, he was waived on October 26, 2010. Overall, he played in two games for the Jets in 2010, recording one solo tackle and one forced fumble.

Green was claimed off waivers by the Green Bay Packers on October 27, 2010. Green was signed in an effort to boost the Packers' injury-depleted defensive line. He appeared in nine games, starting three, for the Packers during the 2010 regular season, totaling six solo tackles, two assisted tackles and one sack. He also played in three playoff games, all starts for the Packers in 2010, recording one assisted tackle. In Super Bowl XLV against the Pittsburgh Steelers, Green was able to hit quarterback Ben Roethlisberger's arm during a pass, forcing an interception that was returned for a touchdown. The Packers eventually won the game 31–25. Green appeared in a career-high 16 games, starting five, for the Packers in 2011, totaling three solo tackles and eight assisted tackles. He became a free agent after the 2011 season. Overall, he played in 76 regular season games, starting 20, during his NFL career, accumulating career totals of 65 solo tackles, 34 assisted tackles, two sacks, three forced fumbles, and one pass breakup.

== Personal life ==
Green is the cousin of former NFL defensive end Jarvis Green, who he played with at LSU, and former NFL wide receiver Skyler Green. Howard's hobbies include going to car shows and fishing. In 2011, Green started a trucking company in Louisiana.

On February 7, 2013, at the Ascension Parish council meeting in Green's hometown of Donaldsonville, it was declared that February 9, 2013 would be “Howard Green Jr. Day in Ascension Parish". Green has also spent time as a youth football coach at the Pro Football Combine Camp at Nicholls State University.
