= Joseph Aristide Landry =

American politician (1817–1881)

Joseph A. Landry

Member of the U.S. House of Representatives from Louisiana's 2nd district
- In office March 4, 1851 – March 3, 1853
- Preceded by: Henry Adams Bullard
- Succeeded by: Theodore Gaillard Hunt

Member of the Louisiana House of Representatives
- In office 1840

Personal details
- Born: Joseph Aristide Landry; July 10, 1817 Donaldsonville, Louisiana
- Died: March 9, 1881 (aged 63) Donaldsonville, Louisiana
- Resting place: Donaldsonville Catholic Cemetery
- Party: Whig

Joseph Aristide Landry (July 10, 1817 – March 9, 1881) was a Confederate Civil War veteran who served as a member of the U. S. House of Representatives representing the state of Louisiana. He served one term as a Whig.

== Biography ==
Joseph Landry was born near Donaldsonville, Ascension Parish, Louisiana, on July 10, 1817. He attended school in Cape Girardeau, Missouri.

=== Political career ===
He served member of the Louisiana House of Representatives in 1840, then elected as a Whig to the Thirty-second Congress, serving from March 4, 1851, to March 3, 1853.

=== Later career ===
After leaving Congress, he was president of the police jury of Ascension Parish in 1861.

=== Civil War ===
Before the Civil War, he was first sergeant in the Chasseurs de l'Ascension. During the war, he attached to Company B of the Cannoneers of Donaldsonville, fighting on the side of the Confederacy.

=== Death and burial ===
He died near Donaldsonville on March 9, 1881, and is interred in Donaldsonville Catholic Cemetery.

== See also ==
- Landry Tomb

U.S. House of Representatives
Preceded by Henry Adams Bullard	Member of the U.S. House of Representatives from Louisiana's 2nd congressional district 1851 – 1853	Succeeded by Theodore Gaillard Hunt
