= Claiborne Williams =

American musician, bandleader, and music teacher (1868–1952)

- Born: December 31, 1868
- Origin: Donaldsonville, Louisiana, US
- Died: October 10, 1952 (aged 83); New Orleans, Louisiana, US
- Genres: Dixieland Jazz
- Occupation(s): Musician; Bandleader; Music teacher
- Instrument: Violin
- Years active: 1880s - 1940s

Claiborne Williams (December 31, 1868 – October 10, 1952) was an American musician, bandleader, and music teacher.

== Life and career ==
Claiborne Williams was born in Ascension Parish near Donaldsonville, Louisiana. As a young man, he worked in New Orleans for the Werlein Music Company on Canal Street, where he repaired musical instruments. At the age of 17 he led a band at the Wilbert Theatre in Baton Rouge. At 18 he was also leader of the St. Joseph Brass Band, and was a music teacher in the nearby towns of Donaldsonville. Notable pupils of Williams were trombone player Louis Nelson, and Oscar "Papa" Celestin; later Louis Nelson played a few dates with Claiborne's orchestra.

Williams was primarily a violinist, but taught all instruments. He charged fifty cents for a lesson lasting from half an hour to an hour. Although he travelled around the USA, Canada and even Europe as leader of "Billy Kersand and his Minstrel Troupe", most of his musical career was spent in and around Donaldsonville. Williams' musical career continued well into the late 1930s early 1940s. Members of the Claiborne Williams band included famed Dave Bartholomew, "Papa" John Joseph, Richard Jones, and Walter Lewis.

Claiborne Williams died at the age of 83 on October 10, 1952, in a New Orleans hospital. He was buried in a Catholic cemetery.
