= Ascension Parish School Board =

School district in Louisiana, US

Coordinates: 30°5′29″N 90°58′29″W

Ascension Parish School Board is a school district headquartered in Donaldsonville, Louisiana, United States.

The district serves Ascension Parish.

Ascension Parish Public Schools (K-12)

== Primary schools ==
- Bluff Ridge Primary School (K-5) (Prairieville, La)
- Bullion primary (K-5) (Gonzales, Louisiana)
- G.W. Carver Primary School (K-5) (Gonzales, Louisiana)
- Central Primary School (K-5) (Gonzales, Louisiana)
- Donaldsonville Primary School (EC-2) (Donaldsonville, Louisiana)
- Duplessis Primary School (K-5) (Gonzales, Louisiana)
- Dutchtown Primary School (K-5) (Geismar, Louisiana)
- Galvez Primary School (K-5) (Prairieville, Louisiana)
- Gonzales Primary School (K-5) (Gonzales, Louisiana)
- Lake Primary School (K-5) (St. Amant, Louisiana)
- Lakeside Primary School (K-5) (Prairieville, Louisiana)
- Lowery Elementary School (3-5) (Donaldsonville, Louisiana)
- Oak Grove Primary School (K-5) (Prairieville, Louisiana)
- Pecan Grove Primary School (K-5) (Gonzales, Louisiana)
- Prairieville Primary School (K-5) (Prairieville, Louisiana)
- St. Amant Primary School (K-5) (St. Amant, Louisiana)
- Spanish Lake Primary School (K-5) (Geismar, Louisiana)
- Sorrento Primary School (K-5) (Sorrento, Louisiana)
- Sugar Mill Primary School (K-5) (Prairieville, La)

== Middle schools ==
- Central Middle School (Gonzales, Louisiana) (6-8)
- Dutchtown Middle School (6-8) (Geismar, Louisiana)
- Galvez Middle School (6-8) (Prairieville, Louisiana)
- Gonzales Middle School (6-8)(Gonzales, Louisiana)
- Lake Middle School (6-8) (St. Amant, Louisiana)
- Lowery Middle School (6-8) (Donaldsonville, Louisiana)
- Prairieville Middle School (6-8) (Prairieville, Louisiana)
- St. Amant Middle School (6-8) (St. Amant, Louisiana)
- Bluff Middle School (6-8) (Prairieville, La)

== High schools ==
- Dutchtown High School (9-12) (Geismar, Louisiana)
- East Ascension High School (9-12) (Gonzales, Louisiana)
- St. Amant High School (9-12) (St. Amant, Louisiana)
- Donaldsonville High School (9-12) (Donaldsonville, Louisiana)
- Prairieville High School (9-12) (Prairieville, Louisiana)

== Other schools/facilities ==
- LeBlanc Special Services (Special Education) (Gonzales, Louisiana)
- Ascension Head Start (Program for Ages 3 to 4) (Donaldsonville, Louisiana)
- Ascension Alternative School (Alternative Program) (Darrow, Louisiana)
- Title I Office (Federal Programs) (Darrow, Louisiana)

== Past board members ==
- Melvin Irvin, board member 1972–1983; president, 1976–1978; state representative, 1984-1992
