= John Lowery =

John Lowery may refer to:

- John 5 (guitarist) (John William Lowery), American guitarist
- John Lowery (bowls), Jersey lawn bowler
- John Harvey Lowery, American physician and philanthropist
- John T. Lowery, Canadian politician and leader of the Alberta Liberal Party
- John Lowery (politician), American politician

== See also ==
- John Lowry (disambiguation)
