= Sidney A. Marchand =

American politician

- Born: December 5, 1887; Ascension Parish, Louisiana, U.S.
- Died: 1972 (aged 84–85)
- Education: Louisiana State University
- Occupations: Lawyer, politician, author
- Spouse: Mary E. Edwards
- Children: 1 son, 2 daughters
- Parent(s): John A. Marchand; Lorena Carver

Sidney A. Marchand (1887–1972) was an American lawyer, politician and local historian. He served as a member of the Louisiana House of Representatives from 1912 to 1916, and from 1928 to 1932. He was the mayor of Donaldsonville, Louisiana from 1929 to 1933. He was the author of many books about the history of Louisiana.

== Early life ==
Sidney A. Marchand was born on December 5, 1887, on the Riverside Plantation in Ascension Parish, Louisiana. He graduated from the Law School at Louisiana State University in 1910.

== Career ==
Marchand co-founded a law firm in Donaldsonville, Louisiana with partner Gustave Adolphus Gondron in 1910.

Marchand served as a member of the Louisiana House of Representatives from 1912 to 1916, and from 1928 to 1932. He served as the mayor of Donaldsonville from 1929 to 1933.

Marchand was the author of several books about the history of Louisiana.

== Personal life and death ==
Marchand married Mary E. Edwards. They had a son, Sidney A. Marchand Jr., and two daughters, Jessie Earline (Reynolds) and Mary Elizabeth (Montgomery) (.

== Works ==
- Marchand, Sidney A. (1927). The Carver-Meyer Tree. Donaldsonville, Louisiana. OCLC 9764534.
- Marchand, Sidney A. (1931). The Story of Ascension Parish, Louisiana. Donaldsonville, Louisiana: S.A. Marchand. OCLC 19380282.
- Marchand, Sidney A. (1936). The Flight of a Century (1800-1900) in Ascension parish, Louisiana. Donaldsonville, Louisiana. OCLC 6874063.
- Marchand, Sidney A. (1943). Acadian Exiles in the Golden Coast of Louisiana. Donaldsonville, Louisiana. OCLC 1074433.
- Marchand, Sidney A. (1949). Across the Years: Donaldsonville and Ascension Parish. Donaldsonville, Louisiana: S.A. Marchand. OCLC 2116674.
- Marchand, Sidney A. (1952). The House of Marchand. Donaldsonville, Louisiana. OCLC 2026701.
- Marchand, Sidney A. (1959). The Chief in the Land of the Chetimaches. Donaldsonville, Louisiana. OCLC 4481481.
- Marchand, Sidney A. (1965). An Attempt to Re-assemble the Old Settlers in Family Groups. Baton Rouge, Louisiana: Claitor's Book Store. OCLC 1680575.
- Marchand, Sidney A. (1966). Forgotten fighters, 1861-1865, Ascension Parish, Louisiana. Donaldsonville, Louisiana. OCLC 3331967.
- Marchand, Sidney A. (1968). Marchands on the Mississippi and the St. Lawrence. Donaldsonville, Louisiana. OCLC 220366.
