= Snookum Russell =

American jazz pianist and bandleader (1913–1981)

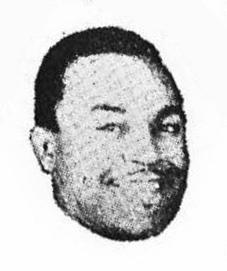
Snookum Russell, c. 1943

Isaac "Snookum" Russell (April 6, 1913 – August 1981) was an American pianist and leader of a territory band that played tobacco warehouses and dance halls in the South and Midwest in the 1930s, 1940s, and 1950s.

Russell was born in Columbia, South Carolina, United States. Members of his bands included J. J. Johnson, who joined shortly after, and played with Fats Navarro, Ray Brown, Tommy Turrentine, and Herbie Phillips.

== Discography ==
- 1962: Jazz at Preservation Hall 4: The George Lewis Band of New Orleans - The George Lewis Band of New Orleans, with George Lewis (cl) Isaac "Snookum" Russell (p) Papa John Joseph (b) Joe Watkins (d) (Atlantic LP 1411)
