= Modeste, Louisiana =

Modeste
- Unincorporated community
- Location of Modeste in Louisiana
- Coordinates: 30°10′16″N 91°0′53″W
- Country: United States
- State: Louisiana
- Parish: Ascension
- Time zone: UTC-6 (CST)
  - Summer (DST): UTC-5 (CDT)
- Postal code: 70346
- Area code: 225

Modeste, Louisiana is an unincorporated village in Ascension, Parish, Louisiana. The community is located along the Mississippi River on Louisiana Highway 405, north of the parish seat of Donaldsonville, between Hohen Solms (area of the Germania-Elise Plantation), and Philadelphia Point, due south and across the river from Geismar.

Modeste was the home of sugar cane plantation owner Leonard Julien (1910-1994) that invented a sugarcane-planting machine Julien lived in the old Babin Place that he purchased from Dr. John Harvey Lowery.
