= Donaldsonville High School =

Public school in Louisiana, United States

Location
- 100 Tiger Drive; Donaldsonville, (Ascension Parish), Louisiana 70346; United States
- Coordinates: 30.0995°N 90.9999°W

Information
- Type: Public high school
- School district: Ascension Parish School Board
- Principal: Dr. O'Neil Robinson
- Staff: 50.34 (on an FTE basis)
- Enrollment: 426 (2023-24)
- Student to teacher ratio: 8.46
- Colors: Black and red
- Mascot: Tiger
- Nickname: Tigers
- Rival: St. James High School

Donaldsonville High School (DHS), is a public high school in Donaldsonville, Louisiana, United States. It is within the Ascension Parish School Board.

The current (2024–present) principal is O'Neil Robinson. The school mascot is the tiger, and the school colors are red and black.

== Principals ==
- L.C. Ferrell 1885-1889
- G.C. Cole 1889-1890
- A. W. Meadows 1890-1892
- M. Knobloch 1892-1893
- Wm. J. Gahan 1893-1895
- R.N. Sims 1895-1898
- J.O. Taylor 1899-1902
- J.L. Rusca 1902-1909
- Arnold Pearce 1909-1910
- J.H. Dupy 1910-1911
- H.B. Messick 1911-1912
- A.J. Dupy 1912
- R.S. Vickers 1912-1914
- W.H. Miller 1914-1915
- R.S. Vickers 1915-1919
- B.C. Alwes 1919-1951
- C.C. Goette 1951-1965
- Keith Falcon 1965-1973
- John Oubre 1973-1977
- Violet Marchand 1977-1980
- Emile Chiquet 1981-1993
- Gerald Alexander 1993-1998
- Ronald Rabalais 1999-2008
- Gwen Boudreaux 2008-2010
- Esrom Pitre 2010-2013
- Marvin Evans 2013–2024
- O'Neil L. Robinson 2024–present

== Athletics ==
Donaldsonville High athletics competes in the LHSAA in class 3A.

=== Championships ===
Football championships

- (1) State Championship: 1954

== Notable alumni ==
- Gerald Alexander, former MLB player (Texas Rangers)
- Howard Green, former NFL player (Green Bay Packers)
- Jarvis Green, former NFL player (New England Patriots)
