= Blayne Enlow =

American baseball player (born 1999)

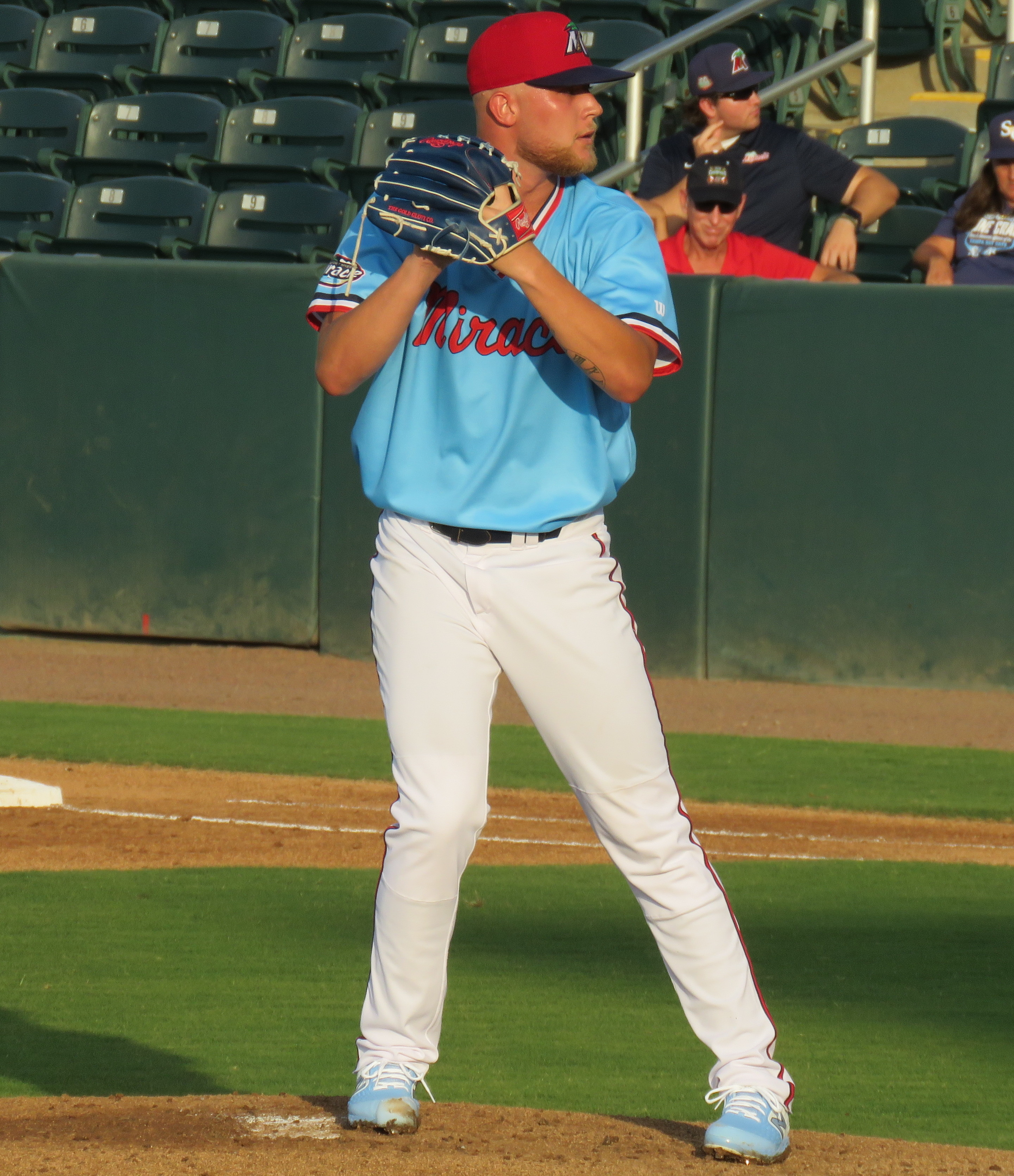
- Enlow with the Fort Myers Miracle in 2019

Free agent
- Pitcher
- Born: March 21, 1999 (age 27); Sorrento, Louisiana, U.S.
- Bats: Right Throws: Right
- Stats at Baseball Reference

Blayne Chanlar Enlow (born March 21, 1999) is an American professional baseball pitcher who is a free agent.

== Amateur career ==
Enlow attended St. Amant High School in Ascension Parish, Louisiana. Before his sophomore year of high school, he broke an ankle and his pelvis in a car accident. He returned to play baseball in his junior year. During his senior year, he played for the USA Baseball 18-and-under team. He committed to attend Louisiana State University (LSU) to play college baseball for the LSU Tigers.

== Professional career ==
=== Minnesota Twins ===
The Minnesota Twins selected Enlow in the third round, with the 76th overall selection, of the 2017 Major League Baseball draft. He signed with the Twins, receiving a $2 million signing bonus, and was assigned to the Gulf Coast Twins of the Rookie-level Gulf Coast League. He spent all of his first professional season with in the GCL, posting a 3–0 record with a 1.33 ERA in 20 1/3 innings. He spent 2018 with the Cedar Rapids Kernels of the Single–A Midwest League, going 3–5 with a 3.26 ERA over twenty games (17 starts).

Enlow returned to Cedar Rapids to begin 2019 and was promoted to the Fort Myers Miracle of the High–A Florida State League in May. Over 21 games (twenty starts) between the two clubs, Enlow went 8–7 with a 3.82 ERA and 95 strikeouts over 110 2/3 innings. Enlow did not play in a game in 2020 due to the cancellation of the minor league season because of the COVID-19 pandemic. He returned to action in 2021 with Cedar Rapids (now members of the High-A Central. He made three starts before it was announced he would be undergoing Tommy John surgery, thus ending his season.

On November 19, 2021, the Twins added Enlow to their 40-man roster to protect him from the Rule 5 draft. Enlow returned to action in 2022, spending the majority of the season with the Double-A Wichita Wind Surge. In 24 appearances for Wichita, he posted a 1–3 record and 4.40 ERA with 3 saves and 64 strikeouts in 57.1 innings pitched. On January 6, 2023, Enlow was designated for assignment by the Twins following the waiver claim of Oliver Ortega. On January 13, he was outrighted to Double-A Wichita. Enlow split the 2023 season between Wichita and the Triple–A St. Paul Saints. He appeared in a combined 26 games (22 starts) and posted a 5–6 record and 5.35 ERA with 109 strikeouts in 99 1/3 innings pitched. Enlow elected free agency following the season on November 6.

=== San Francisco Giants ===
On December 14, 2023, Enlow signed a minor league contract with the San Francisco Giants. Enlow made two starts for the Triple-A Sacramento River Cats, struggling to an 0-1 record and 8.22 ERA with seven strikeouts across 7 2/3 innings pitched. Shortly thereafter, he underwent Tommy John surgery for a second time, and missed the remainder of the season. Enlow elected free agency following the season on November 4, 2024.

=== Atlanta Braves ===
On January 8, 2026, Enlow signed a minor league contract with the Atlanta Braves. In 25 games (2 starts) across three levels of the minors he threw 32.1 innings going 1-2 with a 6.68 ERA and 36 strikeouts. He elected free agency on November 2.
