= Stephen Sullivan (American football) =

American football player (born 1996)

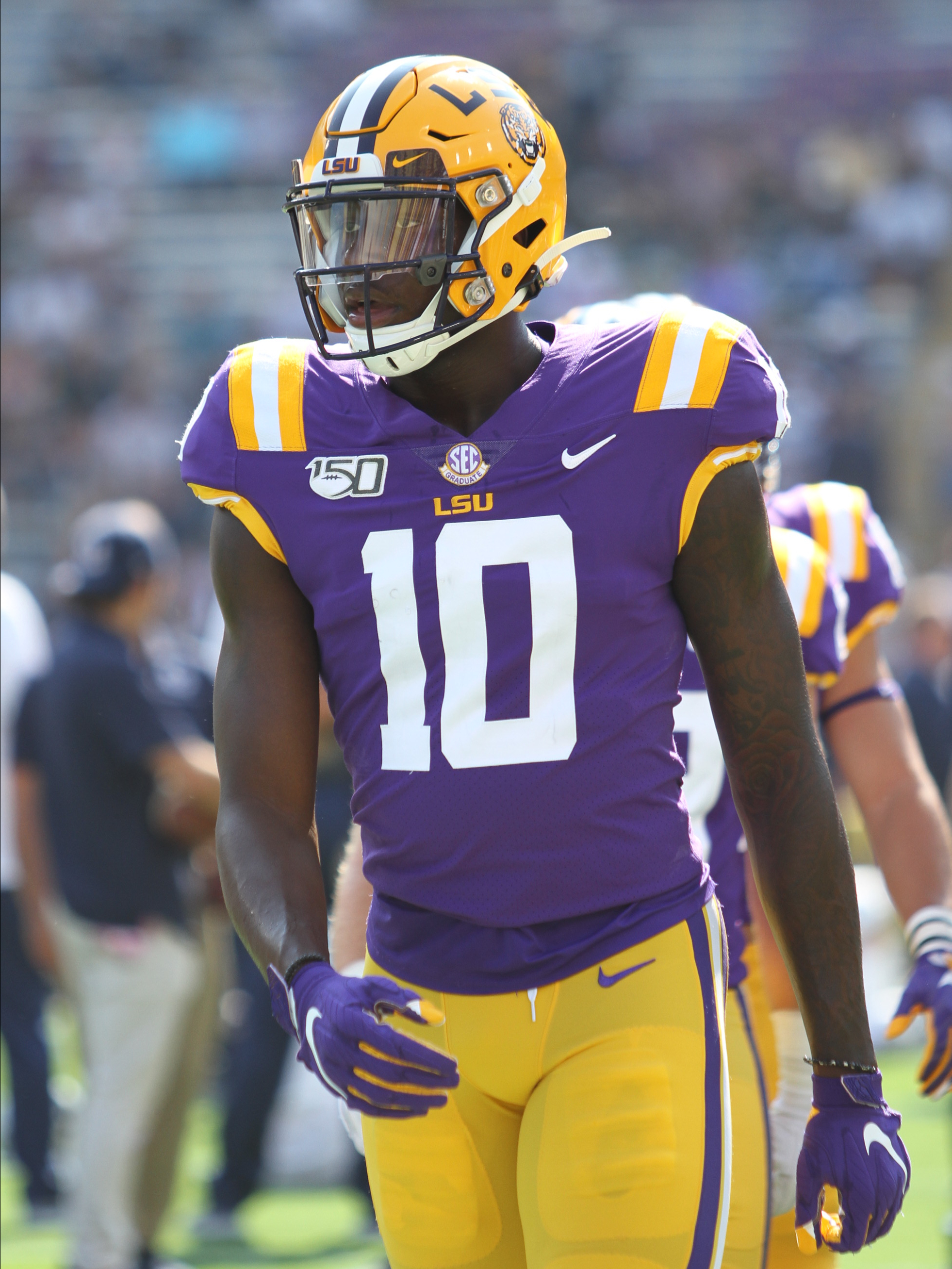
- Sullivan with the LSU Tigers in 2019

Profile
- Position: Tight end

Personal information
- Born: November 28, 1996 (age 29); Donaldsonville, Louisiana, U.S.
- Listed height: 6 ft 5 in (1.96 m)
- Listed weight: 245 lb (111 kg)

Career information
- High school: Donaldsonville
- College: LSU (2016–2019)
- NFL draft: 2020: 7th round, 251st overall pick

Career history
- Seattle Seahawks (2020); Carolina Panthers (2021–2024)

Awards and highlights
- CFP national champion (2019)

Career NFL statistics as of 2024
- Receptions: 14
- Receiving yards: 171
- Stats at Pro Football Reference

Stephen Sullivan (born November 28, 1996) is an American professional football tight end. He played college football for the LSU Tigers and was a part of their national championship win in 2020. In college he played wide receiver. He was selected by the Seattle Seahawks in the seventh round of the 2020 NFL draft.

== Early life ==
Sullivan spent his childhood in Irving, Texas, where he lived in extreme poverty and at times experienced homelessness. His youth football coach offered to let Sullivan live with him. While Sullivan originally planned on attending Nimitz High School, he opted to move to Donaldsonville, Louisiana and stay with family and enroll at Donaldsonville High School. He eventually moved out of his aunt's house and stayed with the family of a teammate. Sullivan excelled in football at Donaldsonville and caught 57 passes for 987 yards and 11 touchdowns as a junior. As a senior, he was named first-team All-State after finishing the year with 57 receptions for 1,159 yards. Sullivan was rated a four-star recruit and committed to play college football at LSU over offers from TCU and Mississippi State.

== College career ==
Sullivan spent his first two seasons playing special teams and was used on offense primarily as a blocking receiver. As a sophomore, he had 11 receptions for 219 yards and a touchdown while also rushing twice for five yards and a touchdown. LSU's coaching staff worked out Sullivan at tight end going into his junior season before ultimately moving him back to receiver. As a junior, he finished second on the team with 23 receptions and 363 receiving yards and scored two touchdowns. Sullivan spent most of his senior season as the Tigers' second tight end, catching 12 passes for 130 yards as the Tigers won the 2020 National Championship.

== Professional career ==
Pre-draft measurables
Height	Weight	Arm length	Hand span	Wingspan	40-yard dash	10-yard split	20-yard split	20-yard shuttle	Three-cone drill	Vertical jump	Broad jump
6 ft 4 7/8 in (1.95 m)	248 lb (112 kg)	35 3/8 in (0.90 m)	10 1/8 in (0.26 m)	7 ft 1 in (2.16 m)	4.66 s	1.62 s	2.72 s	4.62 s	7.51 s	36.5 in (0.93 m)	10 ft 3 in (3.12 m)
All values from NFL Combine

=== Seattle Seahawks ===
Sullivan was selected by the Seattle Seahawks in the seventh round with the 251st overall pick in the 2020 NFL draft. He was waived on September 5, 2020, and signed to the practice squad the next day. While on the practice squad, the Seahawks listed Sullivan as a defensive end as well as tight end after he began practicing at both positions. He was elevated to the active roster on October 31 for the team's week 8 game against the San Francisco 49ers, and reverted to the practice squad after the game. He was placed on the practice squad/injured list on November 23, 2020. His practice squad contract with the team expired after the season on January 18, 2021.

=== Carolina Panthers ===
On February 3, 2021, Sullivan signed a reserve/futures contract with the Carolina Panthers. He was waived on August 31, 2021, and re-signed to the practice squad the next day. On January 8, 2022, Sullivan was promoted to the active roster ahead of the week 17 matchup against the Tampa Bay Buccaneers.

In 2022, Sullivan played in 14 games for Carolina, recording two receptions for 46 yards. On January 9, 2023, Sullivan signed a futures/reserve contract with the Panthers.

On August 31, 2023, Sullivan was placed on injured reserve. He was activated on October 14.

On January 8, 2024, the Panthers signed Sullivan to a one-year contract extension. He was placed on injured reserve on August 1 and released with an injury settlement one week later. He was re-signed to the practice squad on September 30.
