= Pierre Caliste Landry =

American politician, minister, newspaper editor (1841–1921)

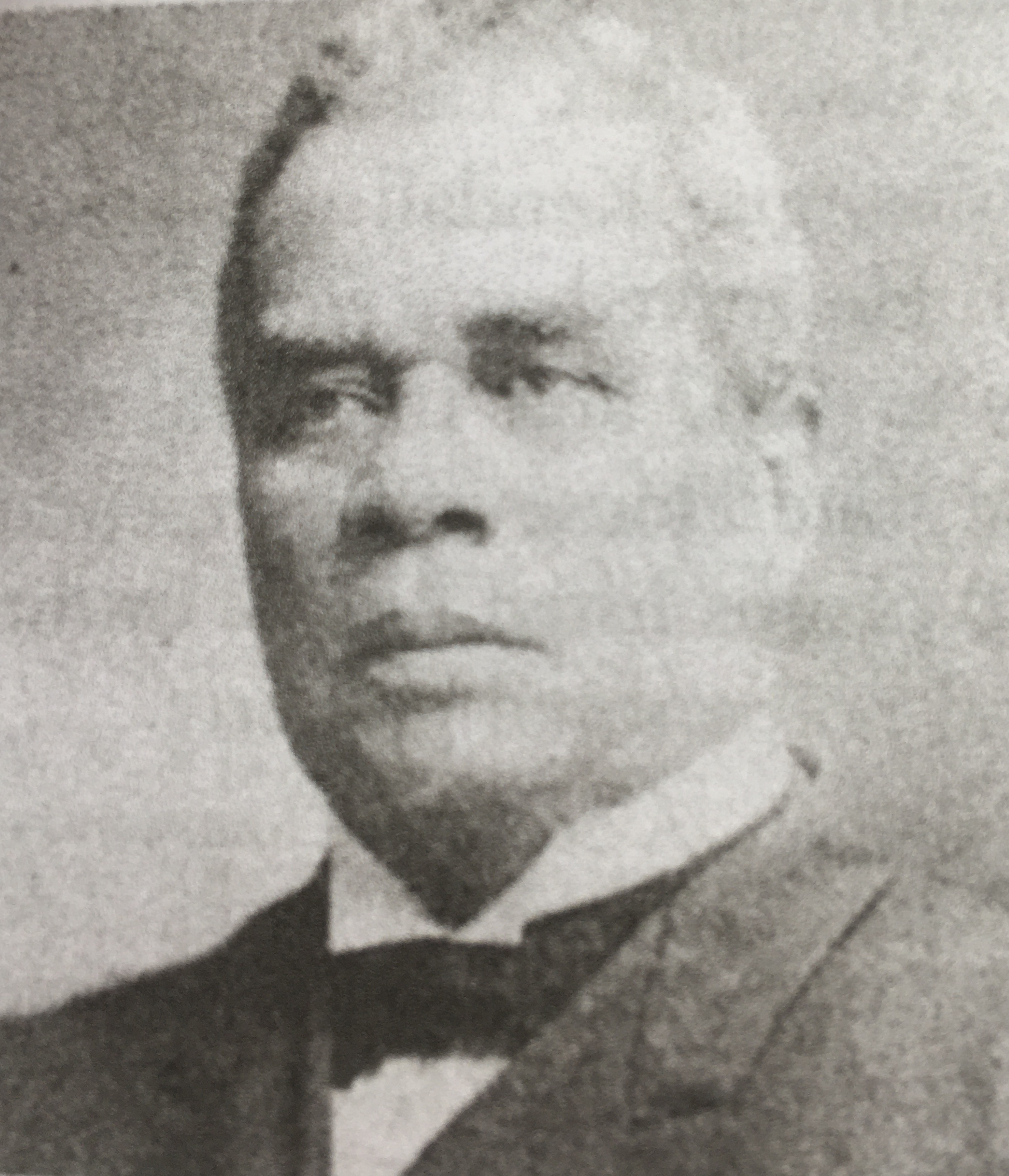

Mayor of Donaldsonville
- In office 1868–1869

Member of the Louisiana House of Representatives
- In office 1872–1874

Member of the Louisiana Senate from the 8th district
- In office 1874–1878

Personal details
- Born: April 19, 1841 Ascension Parish, Louisiana, U.S.
- Died: April 22, 1921 (aged 80)
- Party: Republican
- Spouses: Amanda Grigsby; Florence Simpkins
- Children: 14, included L. B. Landry
- Occupation: Attorney; minister; politician; newspaper editor

Pierre Caliste Landry (April 19, 1841 – December 22, 1921) was an American born into slavery, who went on to become an attorney, Methodist Episcopal minister, mayor, newspaper editor, and state legislator in Louisiana. He was elected in 1868 as mayor of Donaldsonville, making him the first African American to be elected mayor in the United States (Monroe Baker had been appointed mayor of St. Martinville, Louisiana in 1867 by governor Benjamin Flanders).

== Biography ==
=== Early life and education ===
Pierre Caliste Landry was born into slavery in 1841 on the Prevost sugar cane plantation in Ascension Parish, the son of Marcelite Prevost, an enslaved cook, and Roseman Landry, a white laborer. The plantation had one of the largest slave populations devoted to sugar cultivation in the state.

Landry was sold at auction, at age 13, to the Bringier family, which owned 35,000 acres on various plantations. He was likely purchased as the property of Louis Amedée Bringier, who was born on and had inherited the Hermitage Plantation in Ascension Parish (other Bringier plantations were located in St. James Parish).

Landry was educated in the plantation's primary and technical schools. He was also tutored by the ministers W.D. Goodman and A.L. Atkinson.

He was also raised Catholic, first educated in the faith by Fr. Arnaud, whom he identified as a free person of color.

=== Marriage and family ===
Landry married Amanda Grigsby, with whom he had twelve children. After her death, he married Florence Simpkins, and they had another two children. Many of their children continued their parents' commitment to education and the church. His son L. B. Landry (1878–1934) was a noted physician, and community activist in New Orleans.

=== Career ===
By the end of the Civil War, Landry had married and converted to the Methodist Episcopal faith.

He moved with his family to Donaldsonville, which became known for having the third-largest black community in the state. In the postwar years, many freedmen were migrating from rural areas to towns in order to establish their own communities, trades, and businesses independent of white supervision. They also found more safety in their own communities.

In 1868, during the Reconstruction Era, Landry was elected mayor of Donaldsonville, Louisiana, the first African American in the United States to achieve this distinction. He also founded St. Peter's Methodist Episcopal Church and became active in local community affairs on many levels. He served as an elected judge, superintendent of schools, tax collector, president of the police jury, parish school board member, postmaster, and as justice of the peace.

He became influential in the Republican Party, establishing the Black Republicans faction and winning election to the Louisiana House of Representatives in 1872 by a large margin. His bill was passed to establish New Orleans University, which became the third Black private college in Louisiana. In 1874, Landry was elected to the Louisiana State Senate, serving until 1880. The Reconstruction legislature authorized public education for the first time and established a funding mechanism; it also supported a variety of public welfare institutions.

In 1878 Landry was called as minister of St. Peter's Church. He became more involved in church affairs and was elected presiding elder of the Baton Rouge District in 1881. Four years later, he was elected presiding elder of the Shreveport District, where he had moved. In 1889 he became pastor of St Paul Methodist Episcopal Church in Shreveport. He regularly attended the annual conferences of the church, and in 1891 was elected to its highest position, as a Presiding Elder of the South New Orleans District.

=== Death ===
Landry died in 1921.

== See also ==
- List of first African-American mayors
