= Theodore G. Hunt =

American politician

Theodore Gaillard Hunt

Member of the U.S. House of Representatives from Louisiana's 2nd district
- In office March 4, 1853 – March 3, 1855
- Preceded by: Joseph Aristide Landry
- Succeeded by: Miles Taylor

Member of the Louisiana House of Representatives
- In office 1837-1853

Personal details
- Born: October 23, 1805 Charleston, South Carolina, U.S.
- Died: November 15, 1893 (aged 88) New Orleans, Louisiana, U.S.
- Party: Whig; Know Nothing

Theodore Gaillard Hunt (October 23, 1805 – November 15, 1893) was an American lawyer and politician who served as a member of the U. S. House of Representatives representing the state of Louisiana. From 1853 to 1855, he served one term as a Whig.

In 1854, he ran for re-election and lost as a candidate of the American (Know-Nothing) Party.

== Biography ==
Hunt was born in Charleston, South Carolina. In addition to being a member of Congress, Hunt was district attorney for New Orleans, member of the state House of Representative for sixteen years, and later a judge. During his tenure in congress he is notable as one of the few Southerners to have opposed the Kansas-Nebraska Act.

=== Civil War ===
During the American Civil War, Hunt was the colonel of the 5th Louisiana Infantry in 1861-62 and later a brigadier general in the Louisiana militia. He was appointed Adjutant General of Confederate Louisiana by Governor Allen and remained in that position until the end of the war.

=== Death ===
He died on November 15, 1893, at the age of 88.

U.S. House of Representatives
Preceded by Joseph Aristide Landry	Member of the U.S. House of Representatives from Louisiana's 2nd congressional district March 4, 1853 – March 3, 1855	Succeeded by Miles Taylor
