= John Harvey Lowery =

African-American physician

- Born: October 18, 1860; Plaquemine, Iberville Parish, Louisiana, USA
- Died: September 25, 1941 (aged 80)
- Education: Dillard University; New Orleans University Medical College
- Occupations: Physician; Philanthropist; Politician
- Political party: Republican

John Harvey Lowery (October 18, 1860 – September 25, 1941), was an American physician and philanthropist from Donaldsonville in Ascension Parish south of Baton Rouge, Louisiana.

Born in Plaquemine in Iberville Parish, he was one of nineteen children of a bricklayer and a mid-wife. He studied medicine at the old Flint Goodridge Hospital, now Dillard University, and received his medical certificate from New Orleans University Medical College, now Tulane University, on February 21, 1894.

From 1894 until his death, he practiced medicine at his gingerbread-style ornamented house located in Louisiana Square in Donaldsonville. He was also a planter with sugar cane and rice fields, which afforded permanent employment year around to more than two hundred African Americans.

Until the time of his death, Lowery was active in fraternal societies. He was secretary of the endowment department of the District Grand Lodge of Odd Fellows for the state of Louisiana] for a number of years. He was a stockholder and served on the board of directors and the finance committee of the Peoples Industrial Life Insurance Company in New Orleans. This company was sold in 1974.

He was an active Republican and served as a member of his party's State Central Committee. He was also a delegate to every Republican National Convention from 1884 to 1940 having witnessed the nominations of, first, James G. Blaine and, finally, Wendell Willkie.

Lowery's interest in the education of black youth led to his sponsorship of a movement to build a modern school for blacks in Ascension Parish. Because of his generous contribution, the school was named the Lowery Training School. The middle school in Donaldsonville still bears his name. He also donated land for a school in Modeste, a rural community between Donaldsonville and White Castle, Louisiana.
