= Belle Helene, Louisiana =

Unincorporated community in Louisiana, U.S.

Coordinates: 30°10′11″N 90°59′54″W

Belle Helene is an unincorporated community in Ascension Parish, Louisiana, United States.

== History ==
Belle Helene was named after the Belle Helene Plantation.
