= Henry A. Bullard =

American judge

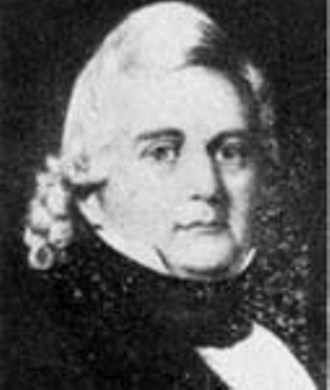

Member of the U.S. House of Representatives from Louisiana's 2nd district
- In office December 5, 1850 – March 3, 1851
- Preceded by: Charles Magill Conrad
- Succeeded by: Joseph Aristide Landry

Member of the U.S. House of Representatives from Louisiana's 3rd district
- In office March 4, 1831 – January 4, 1834
- Preceded by: Walter Hampden Overton
- Succeeded by: Rice Garland

Personal details
- Born: Henry Adams Bullard; September 9, 1788 Pepperell, Massachusetts, US
- Died: April 17, 1851 (aged 62) New Orleans, Louisiana, US
- Resting place: Girod Street Cemetery (until 1959)
- Party: National Republican (3rd Dist.); Whig (2nd Dist.)
- Spouse: Sarah Maria Kaiser

Henry Adams Bullard (September 9, 1788 – April 17, 1851) was a lawyer, slaveholder, and member of the U.S. House of Representatives representing the state of Louisiana. He served two terms as a National Republican and one as a Whig.

== Biography ==
Bullard was born in Pepperell, Massachusetts, graduated from Harvard, and studied law in Boston and Philadelphia. In Louisiana, he resided in Natchitoches, where he practiced law, and in Alexandria, as well as in New Orleans.

He accompanied General José Álvarez de Toledo y Dubois on his military expedition into Spanish Texas in 1813.

=== Congress ===
He was later elected as an anti-Jacksonian to the 22nd and 23rd Congresses, resigned in 1834, and later served as a Whig in the 31st Congress.

=== Career ===
Henry A. Bullard was also a justice of the Louisiana Supreme Court (1834–39) and Secretary of State of Louisiana (1838–39). He was also a professor of civil law at the University of Louisiana Law School (1847) and served in the Louisiana House of Representatives (1850).

=== Death and burial ===
He died in New Orleans and was interred at the Girod Street Cemetery. That burying ground was destroyed in 1959 and unclaimed remains were commingled with 15,000 others and deposited beneath Hope Mausoleum, St. John's Cemetery, New Orleans.

Political offices
Preceded by Alfred E. Forstall	Secretary of State of Louisiana; 1838–1839	Succeeded by Levi Pierce
U.S. House of Representatives
Preceded by Walter Hampden Overton	Member of the U.S. House of Representatives from Louisiana's 3rd congressional district March 4, 1831 – January 4, 1834	Succeeded by Rice Garland
Preceded by Charles Magill Conrad	Member of the U.S. House of Representatives from Louisiana's 2nd congressional district December 5, 1850 – March 3, 1851	Succeeded by Joseph Aristide Landry
Legal offices
Preceded by Alexander Porter; Court reconfigured	Associate Justice of the Louisiana Supreme Court; 1834 – 1839; 1840 – 1846	Succeeded by Pierre Adolphe Rost; Court reconfigured
