= Dutchtown High School (Louisiana) =

- Dutchtown High School logo

Location
- 13165 Highway 73; Geismar, Louisiana 70734; United States; 30°15′35″N 90°59′26″W

Information
- School type: Public
- Established: 2003
- School board: Ascension Parish
- School district: Ascension Parish
- Superintendent: Edith M. Walker
- Principal: Barry Wittington
- Teaching staff: 160.58 (on an FTE basis)
- Grades: 9-12
- Age: 14 to 21
- Enrollment: 2,029 (2024-2025)
- Average class size: 25
- Student to teacher ratio: 15.22
- Campus type: Indoor
- Colors: Silver, black, and purple
- Mascot: Griffin
- Nickname: Griffins
- Website: Official website

Dutchtown High School is a 5A, comprehensive public high school in Geismar, an unincorporated area of Ascension Parish in the U.S. state of Louisiana. It is within the Ascension Parish School Board. Dutchtown Middle and Bluff Middle Schools feed into Dutchtown High. The architecture is based on that of the old Dutchtown High, which was situated across the highway at the current Dutchtown Middle School.

== History ==
According to the Louisiana School Performance Scores/Letter Grades released by the Louisiana Department of Education, Dutchtown High School is an "A" school and is the #1 high-performing open-enrollment public high school in the state of Louisiana.

In 2017, Dutchtown High School was named a 2017 World-Leading Learner and was invited to join the Global Learning Network (GLN), a community of educators from schools that develop, practice, and share innovative approaches to education.

In the Fall of 2024, Prairieville High School opened to relieve a large portion of Dutchtown's enrollment.

== Administration ==
Dutchtown High's administration is structured as follows:

Barry Whittington - Principal

== Academics ==
DTHS has Honors, Advanced Placement, and Dual Enrollment programs.

=== Certifications Offered ===
IBC stands for Industry Board Certification

- Membership to National FFA Organization (All Agriscience Courses)
- Agritechnology IBC (Agriscience III)
- EETC 4-Stroke Technician IBC (Ag Power Equipment)
- Level 1 Carpentry IBC (Carpentry I)
- HVAC Excellence Certification (HVAC Prereq)
- Level 1 Electrician IBC (Electrical Level 1)
- National CCMA Certification (Certified Medical Assistant) Additional Coursework Required
- CPR Certification (Certified Patient Care Technician/Sports Medicine I)
- Emergency Medical Responder License (Emergency Medical Responder)
- EMT Licensure (Emergency Medical Technician)
- National Customer Service Certification (Customer Service/Principles of Marketing)
- Micro-Enterprise Credential (Entrepreneurship I/II)
- Adobe InDesign (Intro to Business Computer Applications)
- Microsoft Office (Intro to Business Computer Applications/Principles of Business)
- AP Capstone Diploma (AP Seminar & AP Research)
- Fashion Design for Costume in Film (Custom Sewing I/II)
- ServSafe Food Handler (Food Science I/ProStart I)
- ServSafe Food Manager (Food Science I/ProStart II)
- Students Teaching and Reaching Certification (Pre-Educator Pathway)
- CompTIA Security+ (Cybersecurity)
- IT Fundamentals (Computer Electronics I)
- CompTIA A+ (Computer Electronics II)
- Fundamentals of Software Development Certification (Fundamentals of HTML, CSS, and Javascript)
- Advanced Software Development Certification (Advanced Software Development)
- 911 Dispatch Certification (Criminal Justice)
- FAA Part 107 - Remote Pilot Certification (Remote Controlled Vehicle Technology)
- AutoDesk AutoCAD (Basic Tech Drafting)
- AutoDesk Investor Certified User (CMAD Drafting)

== Freshman Academy ==
The Freshman Academy at Dutchtown High School is divided into four teams - black, white, silver, and purple - and students are placed on a team that consists of the same english, math, science, and social studies teachers. Each week, each team selects a Student of the Week.

On December 18, 2017, Dutchtown High opened a $12.8 million official Freshman Academy, which will serve over 600 freshmen.

== Athletics ==
Dutchtown High athletics competes in the LHSAA.

Sports offered:

- Cross Country
- Volleyball
- Football
- Swimming
- Wrestling
- Boys' Basketball
- Girls' Basketball
- Boys' Soccer
- Girls' Soccer
- Tennis
- Gymnastics
- Golf
- Track & Field
- Softball
- Baseball
- Bowling

== Notable alumni ==
- Eddie Lacy (Class of 2009), former University of Alabama running back and former running back for the Green Bay Packers and Seattle Seahawks of the National Football League (NFL); 2013 NFL Offensive Rookie of the Year; Pro Bowl (2013)
- Eric Reid (Class of 2010), former Louisiana State University safety and former safety for the San Francisco 49ers and the Carolina Panthers of the National Football League (NFL); Pro Bowl (2013)
- Landon Collins (Class of 2012), former University of Alabama safety and former safety for the New York Giants and the Washington Commanders of the National Football League (NFL); 3× Pro Bowl (2016–2018), First-team All-Pro (2016)
- Justin Reid (Class of 2015), former Stanford University safety and current safety for the New Orleans Saints of the National Football League (NFL), 2x Super Bowl Champion
- Lloyd Cushenberry (Class of 2016), former Louisiana State University center and current center for the Tennessee Titans of the National Football League (NFL).
- Dylan Sampson (Class of 2022), former college football running back for the Tennessee Volunteers and current running back for the Cleveland Browns of the National Football League
