= Landry Tomb =

- U.S. National Register of Historic Places
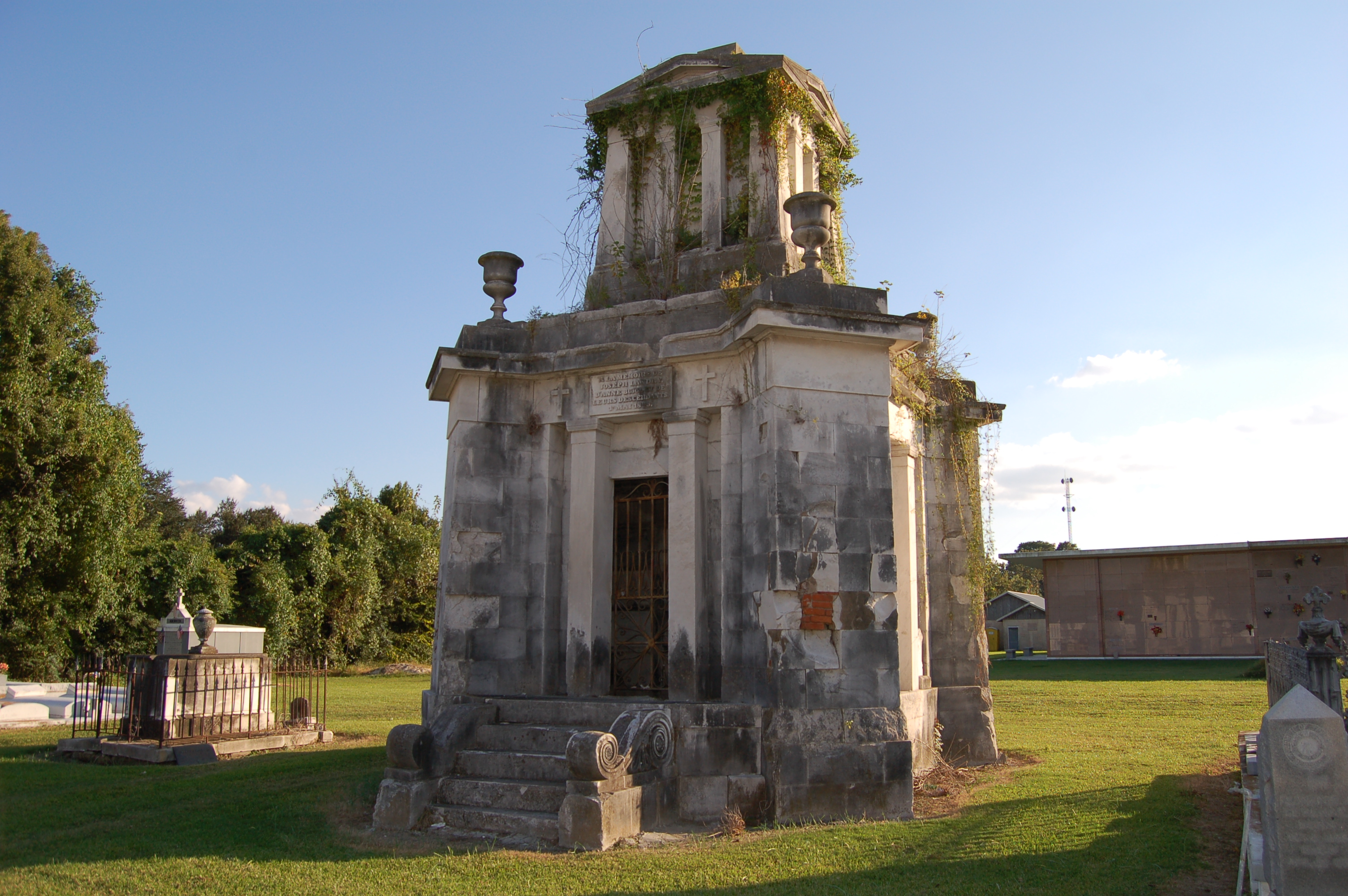

- Location within Louisiana Location within the United States
- Location: Ascension Catholic Church Cemetery, corner of St. Vincent Street and Claiborne Street, Donaldsonville, Louisiana
- Coordinates: 30°05′58″N 90°59′09″W
- Area: 0.1 acres (0.040 ha)
- Built: 1845
- Architect: James Dakin
- Architectural style: Classical Revival
- NRHP reference No.: 82002752
- Added to NRHP: August 11, 1982

Landry Tomb is an historic burial vault located in the cemetery of the Ascension of Our Lord Catholic Church in Donaldsonville, Louisiana. The two stage granite monument, containing 24 vaults, was built in 1845 and its design is attributed to James H. Dakin, an architect whose work included the Old Louisiana State Capitol building.

Landry family members entombed or interred here include U.S. Representative Joseph Aristide Landry (1817–1881).

The tomb was placed on the National Register of Historic Places on August 11, 1982.

Others interred in the cemetery of the Ascension of Our Lord Catholic Church include James Patrick Major, Ralph Falsetta, Duncan Farrar Kenner and Allen Thomas.

== See also ==
- National Register of Historic Places listings in Ascension Parish, Louisiana
