= L. B. Landry =

American physician, activist (1878–1934)

Lord Beaconsfield Landry (1878 – 1934), commonly known as L. B. Landry, was an American physician, civic leader, teacher, newspaper columnist, and vocalist. He was African American, and lived in the Algiers neighborhood in New Orleans, Louisiana where he was an influential community leader. A historical marker is dedicated to him, and a school, the L.B. Landry College and Career Preparatory High School, is named after him in Algiers.

== Early life and education ==
Lord Beaconsfield Landry was born on March 11, 1878, in Donaldsonville, Louisiana; the son of Amanda (née Grigsby) and Pierre Caliste Landry. His father worked as a local politician and was the first Black mayor of Donaldsonville. Lord was the eldest of three sons, all of whom worked in the medical field. He received his elementary education in Donaldsonville and completed high school at Gilbert Academy in New Orleans, followed by further study in Baldwin, Louisiana.

Landry received a B.A. degree in 1902, from Fisk University in Nashville. He was a member of the Fisk Jubilee Singers, a cappella ensemble. After graduation he worked as a teacher for two years. In 1904, Landry enrolled at Meharry Medical College, where he received a M.D. degree in 1908.

== Career ==
Landry returned to New Orleans and practiced medicine in Algiers in New Orleans, where he operated a free clinic for the economically disadvantaged. He taught medicine at Flint Medical College of New Orleans University (later known as Flint-Goodridge Hospital) in New Orleans.

Landry wrote a newspaper column titled "How to Keep Well" published in the Louisiana Weekly newspaper on May 8, 1928. He directed and sang in the Osceola Five, an all male vocal group that specialized in Black cultural music for educational and religious programs.

== Death ==
On January 21, 1934, Landry died at Flint-Goodridge Hospital in New Orleans of an infection in his hand due to an accidental surgical wound that occurred many days prior. He was buried at Mount Olivet Cemetery, until his remains were re-interrned to Nashville.

The L.B. Landry College and Career Preparatory High School in New Orleans was named for him when opened on October 26, 1938.

A historical marker is dedicated to Landry, erected by Freddie Marshall Foundation and L.B. Landry New Generation Historic Alumni Association in Algiers.
