= Donaldsonville Chief =

The Donaldsonville Chief
- Type: Weekly newspaper
- Format: Broadsheet
- Owner(s): Gannett
- Editor: Scott Anderson
- Founded: 1871
- Headquarters: Donaldsonville, Louisiana
- Circulation: 942
- Website: donaldsonvillechief.com

The Donaldsonville Chief is a weekly newspaper published in Donaldsonville, Louisiana. Previously owned by Gatehouse Media, it is currently owned by Gannett. The Donaldsonville Chief is a member of the Louisiana Press Association. News content for the publication is based in the City of Donaldsonville, but also includes the Ascension Parish area. The newspaper has won numerous Louisiana Press Association awards

== History ==
The Donaldsonville Chief was founded in 1871. Linden E. Bentley founded the newspaper as a weekly Republican journal. According to the newspaper's masthead, it is the longest continuous publication in Ascension Parish. The current editor is Greg Fischer.
