= Marchand, Louisiana =

Unincorporated community in Louisiana, U.S.

Coordinates: 30°8′57.7″N 90°59′39.3″W

Marchand is a small unincorporated community in the state of Louisiana and within Ascension Parish. It is located on State Highway 75 that runs north and south on the east bank of the Mississippi River. Intersecting Bowden and Whitney Roads are located near the center of the community. The area is composed mainly of farm and ranch lands located between major petrochemical plants. It obtained its name because the community is located on land that once was part of the Jean Baptiste Marchand plantation.
