= Jarvis Green =

American football player (born 1979)

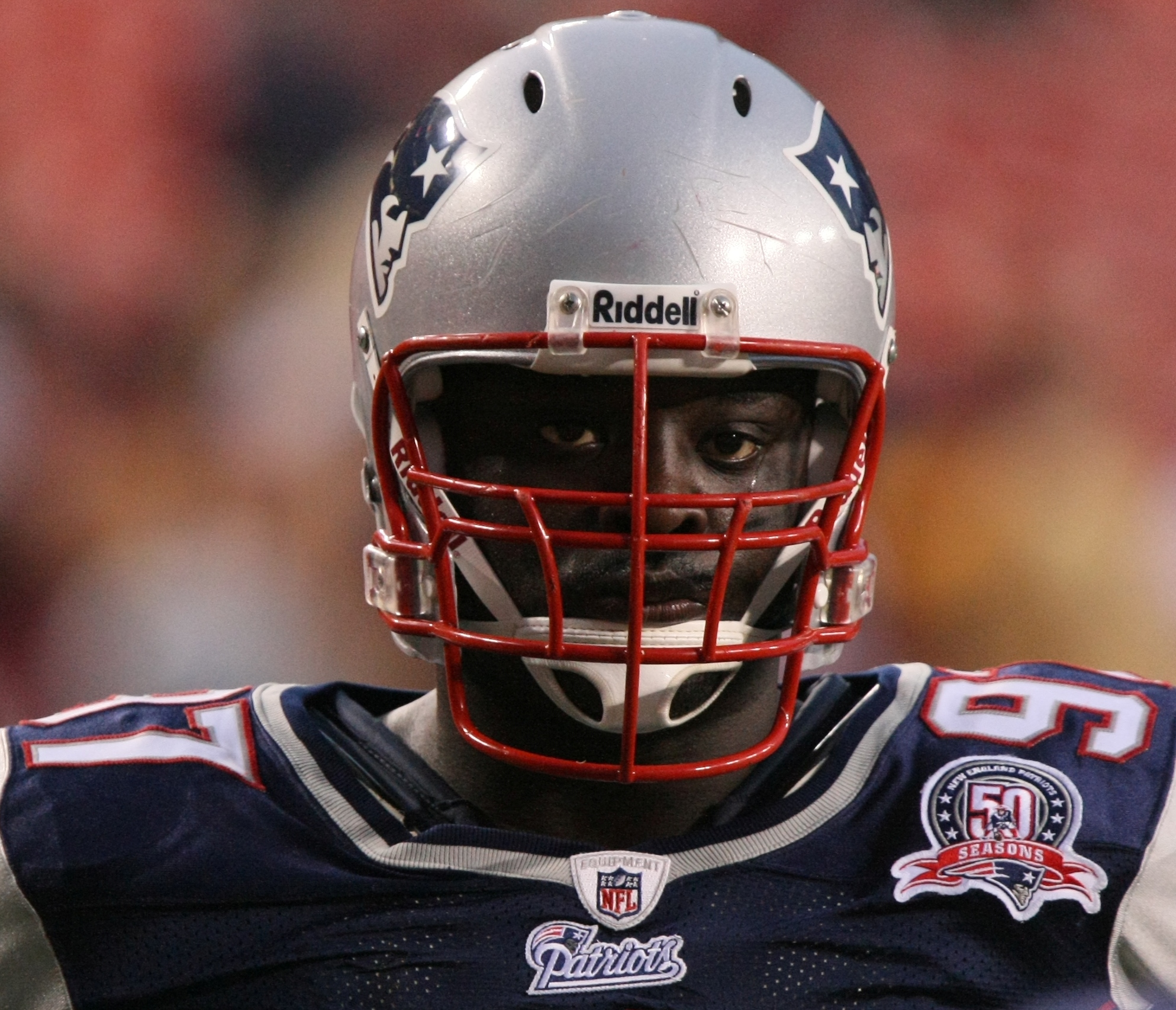
- Green with the New England Patriots in 2009

No. 97
- Position: Defensive end

Personal information
- Born: January 12, 1979 (age 47); Thibodaux, Louisiana, U.S.
- Listed height: 6 ft 3 in (1.91 m)
- Listed weight: 285 lb (129 kg)

Career information
- High school: Donaldsonville (Donaldsonville, Louisiana)
- College: LSU
- NFL draft: 2002: 4th round, 126th overall pick

Career history
- New England Patriots (2002–2009); Denver Broncos (2010)*; Houston Texans (2010)
- * Offseason or practice squad member only

Awards and highlights
- 2× Super Bowl champion (XXXVIII, XXXIX); Second-team All-SEC (2001)

Career NFL statistics
- Total tackles: 233
- Sacks: 28
- Forced fumbles: 9
- Fumble recoveries: 6
- Pass deflections: 4
- Defensive touchdowns: 1
- Stats at Pro Football Reference

Jarvis Pernell Green (born January 12, 1979) is an American former professional football player who was a defensive end in the National Football League (NFL). He was selected by the New England Patriots in the fourth round of the 2002 NFL draft. He played college football at LSU. Green won two Super Bowl rings with the Patriots in his eight seasons in New England. Green had short stints with the Denver Broncos and Houston Texans before retiring at the end of the 2010 NFL Season.

== Early life ==
Green grew up in Donaldsonville, Louisiana, and attended Donaldsonville High School, where he was a Class 3A defensive MVP.

== College career ==
Green played college football at Louisiana State University, where he ranks fourth on the school's all-time sack list with 20 sacks for 123 yards. In 1998, Green set an LSU freshman record with eight sacks for 46 yards, starting 10 games at defensive end. As a sophomore in 1999, Green had seven sacks and 51 tackles. In 2000, Green had 31 tackles and one sack in eight games started. In his senior season in 2001, Green was voted a second-team All-SEC selection after picking up 52 tackles and leading the team with four sacks.

== Professional career ==
=== New England Patriots ===
Pre-draft measurables
Height	Weight	Arm length	Hand span	40-yard dash	10-yard split	20-yard split	20-yard shuttle	Three-cone drill	Vertical jump	Broad jump
6 ft 3 in (1.91 m)	272 lb (123 kg)	34 1/8 in (0.87 m)	10 1/8 in (0.26 m)	4.87 s	1.76 s	2.80 s	4.25 s	7.52 s	31 in (0.79 m)	9 ft 1 in (2.77 m)
Measurables taken at NFL Scouting Combine and logged in scouting report

Green was selected in the fourth round (126th overall) by the New England Patriots in the 2002 NFL draft. In his rookie campaign in 2002, Green recorded 2.5 sacks and started four games. In 2003, Green started seven games and had two sacks; in the AFC Championship against the Indianapolis Colts, Green set career highs with 2.5 sacks and six tackles. Green played in all 16 games in 2004 for the Patriots, starting all three playoff games, including Super Bowl XXXIX. He finished the season with a four sacks. In August 2005, Green was signed to a five-year contract extension by the Patriots; he would go on to post 2.5 sacks while starting five games during the 2005 season.

Green would continue to see limited starting time in 2006, filling in for an injured Richard Seymour. Green set a career-high in 2006 with 7.5 sacks and two passes defensed. With Seymour injured again in 2007, Green would start 10 games and pick up 6.5 sacks, plus a career-high 39 tackles. Green himself missed time in 2008 with an ankle injury, but still managed to play in 14 games and record two sacks.

In 2009, Green was active for 13 games for the Patriots, starting 12 and missing three games in November after knee surgery. He finished the season with 36 tackles and one sack.

=== Denver Broncos ===
Green signed a 4-year, $20 million deal with the Denver Broncos on March 9, 2010. He was released by the team on September 4, 2010.

=== Houston Texans ===
Green signed with the Texans on December 15, after defensive end Mario Williams was placed on injured reserve.

== NFL career statistics ==
Legend
**Bold**	Career high

=== Regular season ===
Year	Team	Games		Tackles					Interceptions					Fumbles			
Year	Team	GP	GS	Cmb	Solo	Ast	Sck	TFL	Int	Yds	TD	Lng	PD	FF	FR	Yds	TD
2002	NWE	15	4	22	15	7	2.5	1	0	0	0	0	**1**	1	0	0	0
2003	NWE	16	7	17	9	8	2.0	3	0	0	0	0	**1**	0	0	0	0
2004	NWE	16	1	21	15	6	4.0	2	0	0	0	0	**1**	1	**3**	0	**1**
2005	NWE	15	5	35	24	11	2.5	2	0	0	0	0	0	1	0	0	0
2006	NWE	16	4	33	**25**	8	**7.5**	3	0	0	0	0	**1**	**3**	1	0	0
2007	NWE	16	10	**40**	22	**18**	6.5	**6**	0	0	0	0	0	2	1	0	0
2008	NWE	14	3	29	22	7	2.0	4	0	0	0	0	0	1	1	0	0
2009	NWE	13	12	36	21	15	1.0	3	0	0	0	0	0	0	0	0	0
Career		121	46	233	153	80	28.0	24	0	0	0	0	4	9	6	0	1

=== Postseason ===
Year	Team	Games		Tackles					Interceptions					Fumbles			
Year	Team	GP	GS	Cmb	Solo	Ast	Sck	TFL	Int	Yds	TD	Lng	PD	FF	FR	Yds	TD
2003	NWE	3	0	**7**	5	2	**2.5**	**2**	0	0	0	0	**1**	0	0	0	0
2004	NWE	3	3	**7**	4	**3**	1.0	0	0	0	0	0	0	**1**	0	0	0
2005	NWE	2	0	4	2	2	0.5	0	0	0	0	0	0	0	0	0	0
2006	NWE	3	0	2	1	1	0.0	0	0	0	0	0	0	0	0	0	0
2007	NWE	3	0	6	**6**	0	1.0	1	0	0	0	0	0	0	0	0	0
2009	NWE	1	1	1	1	0	0.0	0	0	0	0	0	0	0	0	0	0
Career		15	4	27	19	8	5.0	3	0	0	0	0	1	1	0	0	0

== Business career during football career ==
While still active in the NFL, Jarvis opened The Capital Restaurant in his hometown in 2008 and it closed in 2010. About the restaurant Jarvis said, “At the end of the day I lost a lot of money but that’s part of investment, part of taking risks and I have to move on.”

== Life after football ==
Following his retirement from professional football after the 2010-11 NFL season, Green became involved in several food-related business ventures. He opened a shrimp wholesale company named Oceans97, named for his uniform number with the Patriots. He is currently the ambassador for Chef 2 You, a smartphone application designed to offer chef-prepared meals for home delivery.

Green told Scoop B Radio Podcast's Brandon Scoop B Robinson that he had opportunities to go into coaching and broadcasting, but cited owing a friend a favor as his reasoning for going into the shrimping business.
