= Papa John Joseph =

American jazz string bass player (1877–1965)

- Birth name: John Joseph
- Born: November 27, 1877; St. James Parish, Louisiana, US
- Died: January 22, 1965 (aged 87)
- Genres: Jazz
- Occupation(s): String bassist Barber
- Instrument: String bass
- Formerly of: Buddy Bolden; Claiborne Williams band Original Tuxedo Orchestra

John Joseph, better known by his stage name Papa John Joseph (27 November 1877 – 22 January 1965), was an early New Orleans jazz string bass player.

== Biography ==
Joseph was born in St. James Parish, Louisiana in 1877 during Reconstruction, and moved to New Orleans by 1906.

Early in his career he played with Buddy Bolden. He later played in the Claiborne Williams band and the Original Tuxedo Orchestra.

For years in midlife he worked professionally as a barber, playing music occasionally on the side. He returned to music full-time in his later years. He was a regular at Preservation Hall until he famously dropped dead there in 1965 after finishing a rousing version of "When the Saints Go Marching In". He was 87 years old and his jazz funeral took place at St. Augustine Catholic Church in New Orleans.

== Bibliography ==
- New Orleans Jazz: A Family Album by Al Rose and Edmond Souchon
