= John Lowry III =

American civil servant

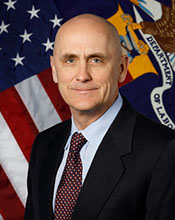
- Alma mater: Princeton University; Stanford University; Harvard University; United States Army War College
- Military career
- Rank: Colonel
- Commands: United States Marine Corps; Marine Corps Reserve; Force Recon
- Conflicts: First Gulf War; War on Terror

John Lowry III is a private sector executive, military veteran, and former Assistant Secretary at the U.S. Department of Labor where he led the Veterans' Employment and Training Service (VETS). The United States Senate confirmed his appointment to lead VETS with unanimous consent. He served in that role from January 2020 until January 2021.

== Early life and education ==
Lowry spent his youth in Connecticut attending public schools in New Canaan. He finished his high school years at Choate Rosemary Hall in Wallingford. He earned a bachelor's degree from Princeton University, and master's degrees from Stanford University, Harvard University, and the U.S. Army War College. He also held an International Affairs Fellowship at the Council on Foreign Relations.

== Career ==
Upon receiving his undergraduate degree Lowry was commissioned as a second lieutenant in the United States Marine Corps. He served 15 years of active duty and then an additional 10 years in the Marine Corps Reserve. He led a Force Recon Platoon during the First Gulf War, and later deployed to Djibouti in support of the global war on terrorism. Lowry retired from the Marine Corps Reserve in 2009 with the rank of colonel.

After leaving active duty and receiving his MBA, Lowry joined Harley-Davidson. He served in a number of leadership roles including General Manager of Harley's Vehicle Operations in Kansas City, MO and their Powertrain Operations in Menomonee Falls, WI. He was also a member of Harley-Davidson's Senior Leadership Group. Lowry left Harley-Davidson to become the Chief Operating Officer of Allied Recreation Group, a private-equity owned recreational vehicle manufacturing company. Allied Recreation Group was subsequently rebranded as part of the REV Group and taken public. Before joining the Department of Labor, Lowry led the U.S. Supply Chain and Operations practice for the international leadership advisory and search firm Egon Zehnder. He rejoined Egon Zehnder upon leaving his government position.
