= Duplessis (surname) =

Duplessis is a French surname. Notable people with the name include:

- Georges Duplessis, a French art historian
- Jerry Duplessis, a composer and record producer
- José María Imbert Duplessis (1798–1847), a French-born Dominican Republic independence war commandant and national hero
- Joseph Duplessis, a French painter
- Kyre Duplessis (born 2002), American football player
- Lucile Duplessis, a French Revolutionary figure, wife of Camille Desmoulins
- Marie Duplessis, a French courtesan and mistress
- Maurice Duplessis (1890-1959), a premier of Québec in the mid twentieth century
- Rachel Blau DuPlessis (1941–2026), an American poet and editor of George Oppen's Selected Letters
- Thomas Duplessis (born Thomas-Antoine de Mauduit du Plessis) (1753–1791), a French officer who fought with the Continental Army during the American Revolutionary War
