= Duplessis, Louisiana =

Duplessis
- Unincorporated community
- Location of Duplessis in Louisiana
- Coordinates: 30°16′11″N 90°56′18″W
- Country: United States
- State: Louisiana
- Parish: Ascension
- Elevation: 16 ft (4.9 m)
- Time zone: UTC-6 (CST)
  - Summer (DST): UTC-5 (CDT)
- ZIP code: 70728
- Area code: 225

Duplessis is an unincorporated community located in Ascension Parish, Louisiana, United States, which is located north of Gonzales.
