= John Lowry (mathematician) =

English mathematician

- Born: 1769
- Died: 3 January 1850 (aged 80–81); Pimlico, London, England
- Occupation: Mathematician

John Lowry (1769 – 3 January 1850) was an English mathematician.

== Biography ==
Lowry was a native of Cumberland. He was for some time an excise officer at Solihull, near Birmingham, but in 1804 he obtained an appointment as master of arithmetic in the new military college at Great Marlow. He held this post until 30 June 1840, when failing sight compelled him to resign on a pension. About 1846 he became totally blind. He died at Pimlico, London, on 3 January 1850, aged 80. Lowry was one of the earliest and most frequent contributors to Thomas Leybourn's "Mathematical Repository" (1799 to 1819). He was the author of a tract on spherical trigonometry appended to the second volume of Isaac Dalby's "Course of Mathematics," the text-book formerly in use at Sandhurst (1805); and the writer of his obituary in the "Gentleman's Magazine" claims for him also the treatises on arithmetic and algebra in the same work.
