= East Ascension High School =

Location
- 612 E Worthy Street; Gonzales, Louisiana 70737; United States; 30°13′35.8″N 90°54′54.6″W

Information
- Type: Public
- Established: 1966; 60 years ago
- Principal: Lauren Lambert Avery
- Teaching staff: 153.77 (on an FTE basis)
- Grades: 9-12
- Enrollment: 2,157 (2023–2024)
- Student to teacher ratio: 14.03
- Colors: Royal blue and yellow
- Athletics conference: District 5-5A
- Mascot: Spartan
- Nickname: Spartans
- Website: homepage

East Ascension High School, commonly referred to as EA, is a public high school in Gonzales, Louisiana, United States. It is managed by the Ascension Parish School Board.

As of 2024, the principal is Lauren Lambert Avery. The school mascot is the spartan, and the school colors are royal blue and yellow. The school newspaper is The Spartan Lance, a member of the High School National Ad Network. East Ascension students primarily come from Gonzales Middle School and Central Middle School.

== Demographics ==
As of the 2022–2023 school year the school's students were:

- Black: 47.2%
- White: 30.7%
- Hispanic: 17.4%
- Asian: 0.8%
- American Indian or Native Alaskan: 0.3%
- Native Hawaiian or Pacific Islander: 0.2%
- Two or more races: 3.3%

== Athletics ==
East Ascension High athletics participates in the LHSAA District 5-5A and provides a wide range of athletic programs. This includes well-known sports such as football and basketball, as well as lesser known sports like bowling and wrestling

=== Athletic Programs ===
Football	Basketball	Girls Basketball
Baseball	Softball	Soccer
Girls Soccer	Volleyball	Wrestling
Golf	Bowling	Cross-Country
Gymnastics	Swimming	Tennis
Track and Field	Powerlifting	

== Notable alumni ==
- David W. Brown graduated in 1997. Book author and contributor to The New Yorker and The New York Times.
- Glenn Dorsey graduated in 2004. National Football League (NFL) football player.
- Andrew Glover graduated in 1987. NFL football player.
- John McConnell An actor and radio personality.
- Mike Mohler Major League Baseball pitcher.
- Alicia Morton graduated in 2005. Former actress.
- Shawn Nelson graduated in 2004. NFL football player.
