= Donaldsonville, Louisiana =

- City
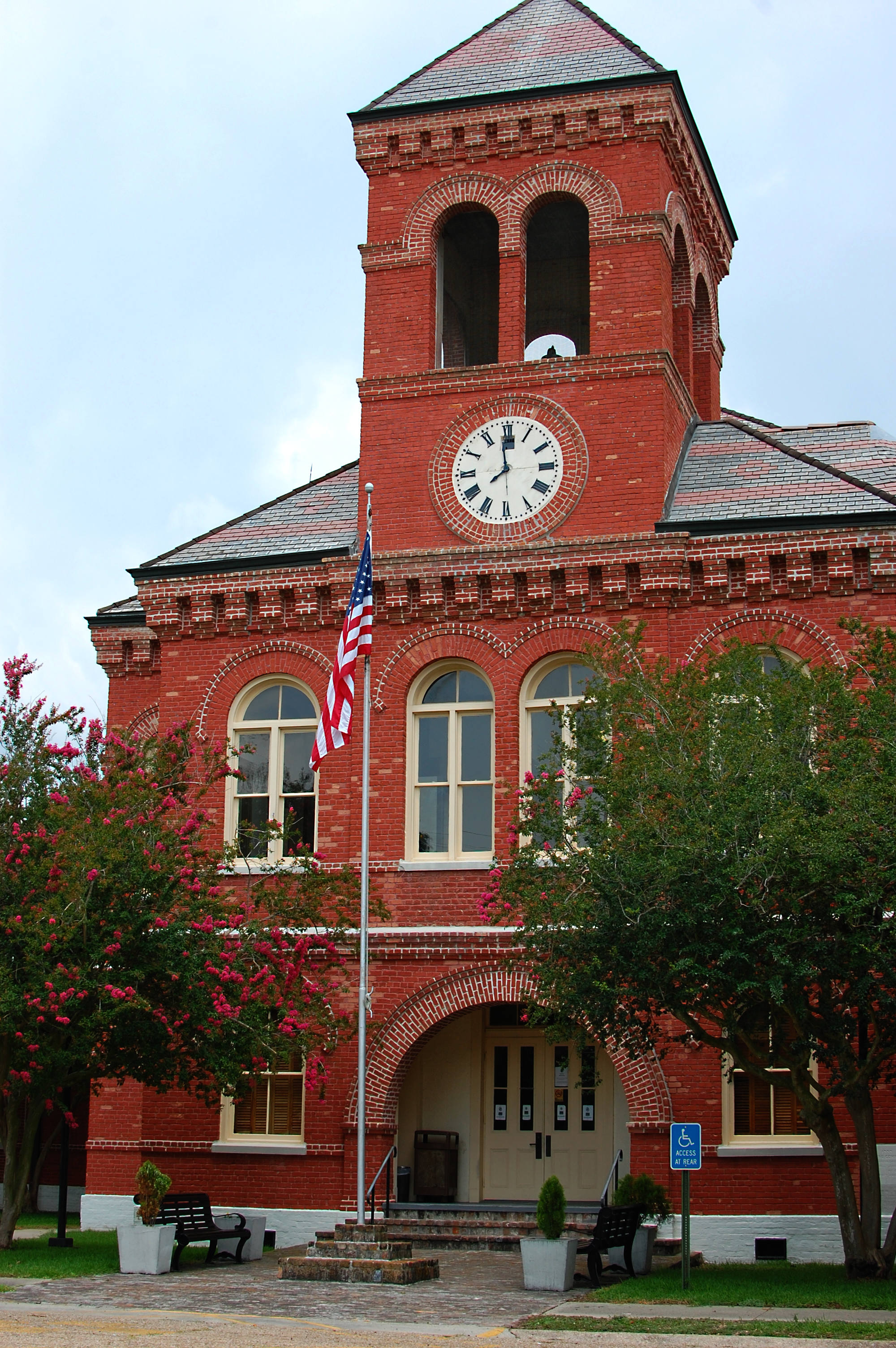
- The Old Ascension Parish Courthouse is located on Railroad Avenue in Donaldsonville

- Location of Donaldsonville in Ascension Parish, Louisiana.

- Location of Louisiana in the United States
- Coordinates: 30°6′0″N 90°59′39″W
- Country: United States
- State: Louisiana
- Parish: Ascension

Government
  - Mayor: Leroy Sullivan, Sr. (elected 2012)

Area
  - Total: 3.80 sq mi (9.84 km^{2})
  - Land: 3.78 sq mi (9.78 km^{2})
  - Water: 0.023 sq mi (0.06 km^{2})
- Elevation: 26 ft (7.9 m)

Population (2020)
  - Total: 6,695
  - Density: 1,772.1/sq mi (684.23/km^{2})
- Time zone: UTC-6 (CST)
  - Summer (DST): UTC-5 (CDT)
- ZIP Code: 70346
- Area code: 225
- FIPS code: 22-21240
- Website: http://www.donaldsonville-la.gov/

Donaldsonville (historically French: Lafourche-des-Chitimachas) is a city in, and the parish seat of Ascension Parish in the U.S. state of Louisiana. Located along the River Road of the west bank of the Mississippi River, it is a part of the Baton Rouge metropolitan statistical area. At the 2020 U.S. census, it had a population of 6,695.

Donaldsonville's historic district has what has been described as the finest collection of buildings from the antebellum era to 1933, of any of the Louisiana river towns above New Orleans. Union forces attacked the city, occupying it and several of the river parishes beginning in 1862. Fort Butler was built on the west bank of the Mississippi River. The fort was successfully defended on June 28, 1863, against a Confederate attack. This battle was one of the first occasions when free blacks and fugitive slaves fought as soldiers on behalf of the Union. The fort is listed on the National Register of Historic Places.

After the war, in 1868 Donaldsonville residents elected as mayor Pierre Caliste Landry, an attorney and Methodist minister; he was the first African American to be elected as mayor in the United States.

== History ==
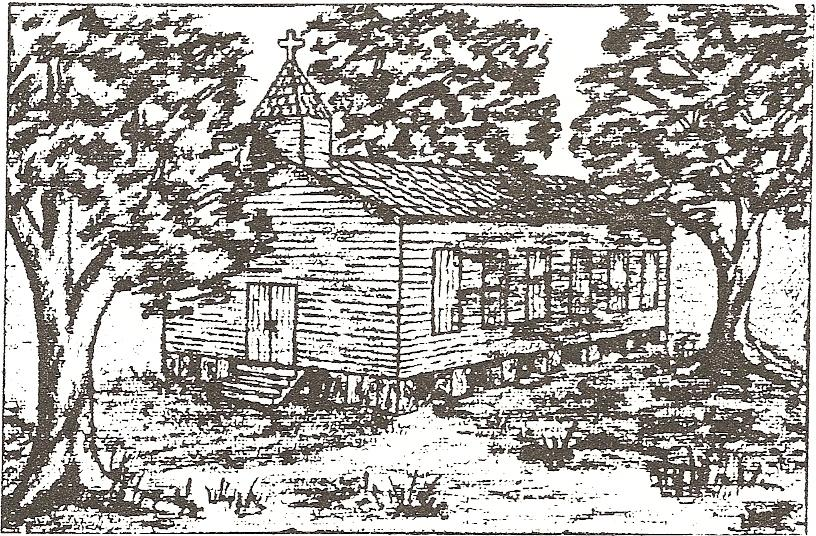
Ascension of Our Lord Catholic Church in 1772.

The French were the first Europeans to colonize the area. They named the site Lafourche-des-Chitimachas, after the regional indigenous people and the local bayou, which they gave the same name. They developed agriculture in the parish, mainly as sugar cane plantations worked by African slave labor.

Acadians, expelled by the British from Acadia in 1755, began to settle in the area from 1756 to 1785, where they developed small subsistence farms. Spanish Isleños also settled here. In 1772 when the territory was under Spanish rule, the militia constructed La Iglesia de la Ascensión de Nuestro Señor Jesucristo de Lafourche de los Chetimaches (the Ascension of Our Lord Catholic Church of Lafourche of the Chitimaches) to serve the area. The region returned later to French control for a time.

This area was included in the Louisiana Purchase in 1803 and became part of the United States. Americans began to move into the area. Landowner and planter William Donaldson in 1806 commissioned the architect and planner, Barthelemy Lafon, to plan a new town at this site. It was renamed Donaldsonville after him.

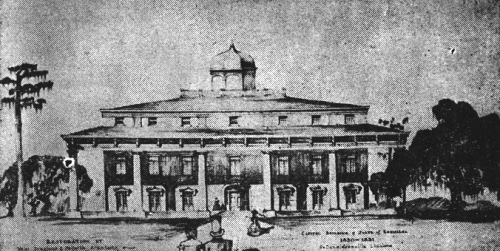
The Louisiana State Capitol in Donaldsonville (1830)

Donaldsonville was designated as the Louisiana capital (1829–1831), as the result of conflict between the increasing number of Anglo-Americans, who deemed New Orleans "too noisy" and wanted to move the capital closer to their centers of population farther north in the state, and French Creoles, who wanted to keep the capital in a historically-French area.

As a result of the wealth planters gained from sugar and cotton commodity crops, they built fine mansions and other buildings in town during the antebellum years.

=== Civil War ===
In the summer of 1862, Donaldsonville was bombarded by Union forces during the American Civil War as part of the Union's effort to gain control of the Mississippi River. The Union sent gunboats to the town and warned that if shots were fired, the Union Navy would strike the area for six miles to the south and nine miles to the north and destroy every building on every plantation. Admiral David G. Farragut destroyed much of the former capital city and put Ascension Parish under martial law, extending that to other River parishes.

Historian John D. Winters, in his The Civil War in Louisiana (1963), describes the scene:

The irate naval commander, Admiral Farragut, ordered the bombardment of Donaldsonville as soon as it could be evacuated. All of the citizens of Donaldsonville . . . "left their homes and went to the bayou . . . a detachment of Yankees went to shore with fire torches in hand." The hotels, warehouses, dwellings, and some of the most valuable buildings of the town were destroyed, Plantations . . . were bombarded and set afire. . . . A citizens' committee met and decided to ask Governor Moore to keep the [Confederate] Rangers from firing on Federal boats. These attacks did no real good and brought only crude reprisals against the innocent and helped to keep the Negroes stirred up.

A citizen complained that the Rangers were useless and lawless, unable or unwilling to protect Confederate property. The citizen added that the Confederate people "could not fare worse were we surrounded by a band of Lincoln's mercenary hirelings. Our homes are entered and pillaged of everything that they [Rangers] see fit to appropriate to themselves."

Union forces established a base at Donaldsonville for their occupation of river parishes. They took over some plantations, running them as U.S. government plantations to supply the forces and produce cotton.

==== Fort Butler ====
Many escaping slaves entered the Union lines to gain freedom. General Benjamin Butler had declared them "contrabands" of war and would not return them to slaveholders. They stayed and worked with Union forces, helping build the star-shaped Fort Butler in the town. A work of earth and wood, it was 381 feet long on the side by the Mississippi River, the other was protected by Bayou Lafourche, and the land sides by a deep moat. A stockade surrounded the fort, which contained a high and thick earth parapet. There was further security from a strong log. The fort was built to accommodate 600 men, but in 1863 there were a small garrison of 180 Union men, commanded by Major Joseph Bullen of the 28th Maine; the forces were also made up of the 1st Louisiana Volunteers, a few Louisiana Native Guard convalescents, and some fugitive slaves.

In June 1863, Confederate forces attacked Fort Butler at night. Led by General Tom Green, more than 1,000 Texas Rangers attacked the fort. Free blacks and fugitive slaves joined in the successful defense of the fort, in one of the first times they fought as soldiers on behalf of the Union. The New York Tribune wrote; "When action took place the negroes were stimulated to daring deeds." Historian Don Frazier, wrote; "Not only did black hands build this citadel of freedom, they defended it to the death." The Union kept control of the fort and ultimately won the war. It has been listed on the National Register of Historic Places.

=== Post-Civil War ===
After the war, Donaldsonville became the third-largest black community in the state, as more freedmen moved there to join those who had settled near Union forces for safety during the war. In 1868 the city elected the first African-American mayor in the United States, Pierre Caliste Landry, a former slave who been educated in schools on a plantation owned by the Bringier family. After the war, he had advanced to become an attorney and state politician, serving in both houses of the legislature. He also became a Methodist Episcopal minister.

Donaldsonville is the home of one of the oldest synagogue buildings still standing in the United States. The wooden structure was built in 1872 by Congregation Bikur Cholim, which disbanded in the 1940s. It is now used as an Ace Hardware store. The Jewish Cemetery dates to 1800s and is located on the corner of St. Patrick Street and Marchand Drive.

Mechanization of agriculture and other changes resulted in a major loss of population in Ascension Parish from 1900 to 1930, particularly from 1920 to 1930. This was the period of the Great Migration, when tens of thousands of African Americans left the rural South to go for opportunities in northern and midwestern cities. Such changes also drew off business from the parish seat. Ascension Parish lost more than 16% of its population in that decade. In the Great Depression, the area struggled economically.

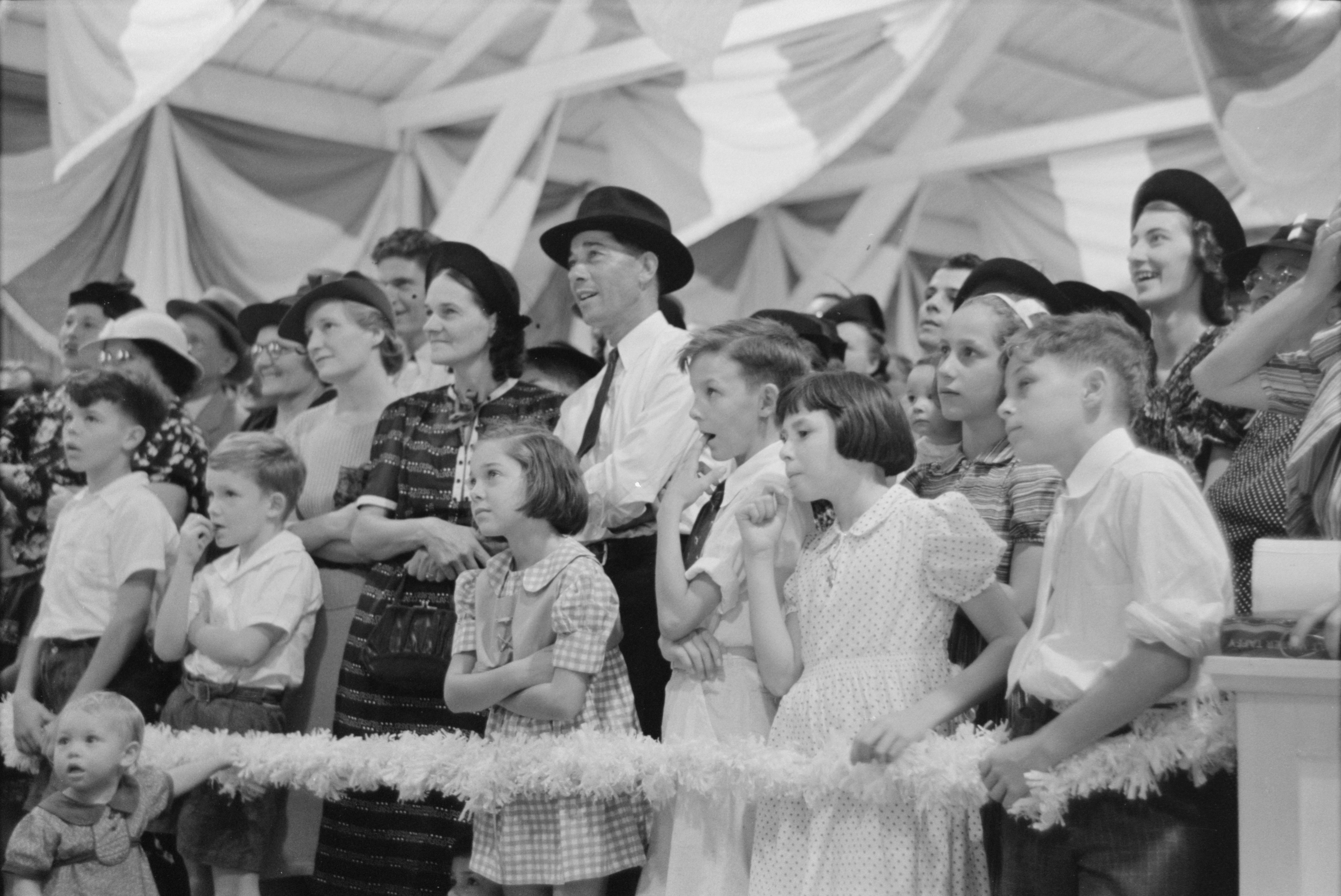
An audience watches a magician perform at the Louisiana State Fair in Donaldsonville (1938)

Historian Sidney A. Marchand, who was also an attorney, was elected as mayor of the city and state legislator during that period. He served as a state Senator and contemporary of Governor Huey Long. During the mayoral administrations of Sidney A. Marchand and his son Sidney Marchand, Jr., they directed the construction of significant infrastructure in Donaldsonville (including about 12 miles of paving, and the still-extant sewerage system). Today the Donaldsonville Historic District has what is described as the "finest collection of buildings from the pre-Civil War to 1933 period" of rivertowns above New Orleans. It is listed on the National Register of Historic Places.

In the 21st century, Donaldsonville is a small city with numerous historic sites. Since 2008, the River Road African American Museum, located in the city, has been included on the Louisiana African American Heritage Trail. It also has parks, Civil War grounds, and shopping centers.

The official newspaper of the city is the Donaldsonville Chief, which has been published since 1871.

== Geography ==
According to the United States Census Bureau, the city has a total area of 2.5 square miles (6.5 km^{2}), all land. Coming upriver on the Mississippi, Donaldsonville is the point of the first expanse of land beyond the narrow natural levee. The city sits approximately 25 feet above sea level. Donaldsonville is located where Bayou Lafourche, a distributary of the Mississippi River, formerly branched off until the entrance was dammed in 1905.

=== Climate ===
Climate data for Donaldsonville, Louisiana (1991–2020 normals, extremes 1893–present)
Month	Jan	Feb	Mar	Apr	May	Jun	Jul	Aug	Sep	Oct	Nov	Dec	Year
Record high °F (°C)	92 (33)	88 (31)	94 (34)	97 (36)	100 (38)	102 (39)	102 (39)	105 (41)	103 (39)	100 (38)	92 (33)	90 (32)	104 (40)
Mean maximum °F (°C)	77.4 (25.2)	79.6 (26.4)	83.5 (28.6)	86.7 (30.4)	91.2 (32.9)	94.2 (34.6)	95.4 (35.2)	95.9 (35.5)	93.8 (34.3)	89.5 (31.9)	83.4 (28.6)	79.7 (26.5)	96.7 (35.9)
Mean daily maximum °F (°C)	62.1 (16.7)	66.1 (18.9)	72.4 (22.4)	78.4 (25.8)	84.9 (29.4)	89.2 (31.8)	90.6 (32.6)	90.8 (32.7)	87.6 (30.9)	80.3 (26.8)	70.9 (21.6)	64.4 (18.0)	78.1 (25.6)
Daily mean °F (°C)	51.9 (11.1)	55.6 (13.1)	61.7 (16.5)	67.8 (19.9)	75.0 (23.9)	80.4 (26.9)	82.1 (27.8)	81.9 (27.7)	78.3 (25.7)	69.4 (20.8)	59.8 (15.4)	54.1 (12.3)	68.2 (20.1)
Mean daily minimum °F (°C)	41.7 (5.4)	45.2 (7.3)	51.0 (10.6)	57.1 (13.9)	65.1 (18.4)	71.6 (22.0)	73.5 (23.1)	73.1 (22.8)	69.1 (20.6)	58.6 (14.8)	48.6 (9.2)	43.7 (6.5)	58.2 (14.6)
Mean minimum °F (°C)	25.6 (−3.6)	30.4 (−0.9)	34.1 (1.2)	42.1 (5.6)	53.4 (11.9)	64.8 (18.2)	69.0 (20.6)	68.4 (20.2)	57.9 (14.4)	42.4 (5.8)	33.5 (0.8)	29.1 (−1.6)	24.3 (−4.3)
Record low °F (°C)	10 (−12)	3 (−16)	24 (−4)	32 (0)	41 (5)	54 (12)	59 (15)	60 (16)	43 (6)	26 (−3)	21 (−6)	9 (−13)	3 (−16)
Average precipitation inches (mm)	5.78 (147)	4.11 (104)	4.03 (102)	4.88 (124)	5.64 (143)	6.97 (177)	6.51 (165)	6.37 (162)	5.39 (137)	4.65 (118)	4.21 (107)	4.86 (123)	63.40 (1,610)
Average snowfall inches (cm)	0.0 (0.0)	0.0 (0.0)	0.0 (0.0)	0.0 (0.0)	0.0 (0.0)	0.0 (0.0)	0.0 (0.0)	0.0 (0.0)	0.0 (0.0)	0.0 (0.0)	0.0 (0.0)	0.1 (0.25)	0.1 (0.25)
Average precipitation days (≥ 0.01 in)	10.6	8.9	8.0	7.4	8.0	12.3	13.4	12.9	8.9	6.7	7.3	9.0	113.4
Average snowy days (≥ 0.1 in)	0.0	0.0	0.0	0.0	0.0	0.0	0.0	0.0	0.0	0.0	0.0	0.2	0.2
Source: NOAA

== Demographics ==
Historical population
Census	Pop.	Note	%±
1860	1,475		—
1870	1,573		6.6%
1880	2,600		65.3%
1890	3,121		20.0%
1900	4,105		31.5%
1910	4,090		−0.4%
1920	3,745		−8.4%
1930	3,788		1.1%
1940	3,889		2.7%
1950	4,150		6.7%
1960	6,082		46.6%
1970	7,367		21.1%
1980	7,901		7.2%
1990	7,949		0.6%
2000	7,605		−4.3%
2010	7,436		−2.2%
2020	6,695		−10.0%
2025 (est.)	7,094	▲	6.0%
U.S. Decennial Census

Donaldsonville racial composition as of 2020
Race	Number	Percentage
White (non-Hispanic)	1,208	18.04%
Black or African American (non-Hispanic)	5,176	77.31%
Native American	1	0.01%
Asian	13	0.19%
Other/Mixed	136	2.03%
Hispanic or Latino	161	2.4%

At the census of 2000, there were 7,605 people, 2,656 households, and 1,946 families residing in the city. The population density was 2,986.9 inhabitants per square mile (1,153.2/km^{2}). There were 2,948 housing units at an average density of 1,157.8 per square mile (447.0/km^{2}). In 2020, the U.S. Census Bureau determined 6,695 people lived in the city, down from 7,436 in 2010. There were 3,031 households and 1,846 families in the city at the 2020 census.

In 2000, the racial and ethnic makeup of the city was 29.82% White, 69.13% Black or African American, 0.12% Native American, 0.12% Asian, 0.37% from other races, and 0.45% from two or more races. Hispanic and Latino Americans of any race were 1.10% of the population. By 2020, the racial and ethnic makeup was 18.04% non-Hispanic white, 77.31% African American, 0.01% Native American, 0.19% Asian, 2.03% from two or more races, and 2.4% Hispanic or Latino of any race.

In 2000, median income for a household in the city was $24,084, and the median income for a family was $29,408. Males had a median income of $31,849 versus $17,528 for females. The per capita income for the city was $12,009. About 32.8% of families and 34.8% of the population were below the poverty line, including 49.0% of those under age 18 and 22.2% of those age 65 or over. From 2014 to 2019, its median household income increased to $25,551 and $36,667 for families. At the 2021 American Community Survey, the median income was $20,052, while families had a median income of $26,061, down from the 2000 census.

== Notable people ==
- Bernette Joshua Johnson (1943 - ) Chief Justice of the Louisiana Supreme Court, (2013 – 2020) and Associate Justice of the Louisiana Supreme Court from the 7th district (1994 - 2020)
- D-D Breaux – head coach of the LSU Lady Tigers gymnastics team
- Jarvis Green – defensive end, NFL's New England Patriots
- Howard Green – defensive end, NFL
- Jack P. F. Gremillion (1914–2001) – Attorney General of Louisiana, 1956–1972
- Henry Johnson – Governor of Louisiana (1824–28)
- Plas Johnson – saxophonist
- Duncan F. Kenner (1813–1887) – built Ashland Plantation, C.S.A. ambassador to France & England, horse racer, founder of Kenner
- Joseph Aristide Landry (1817–1881) – Congressman
- L. B. Landry (1878–1934) African American physician, and community leader
- Pierre Caliste Landry – first African-American mayor in the US (1868)
- John Harvey Lowery (1860–1941) – physician and philanthropist
- Francis T. Nicholls – Governor of Louisiana (1877–80, 1888–92), Confederate general
- King Oliver (1881–1938) – jazz musician
- Stephen Sullivan – NFL tight end for Carolina Panthers
- Nicholas Trist – negotiator of the Treaty of Guadalupe-Hidalgo
- Sarah S. Vance – judge, U.S. District Court, Eastern District of Louisiana
- Edward Douglass White, Sr. – Governor of Louisiana (1834–38), father of the Chief Justice of the U.S. Supreme Court Edward Douglass White
- Claiborne Williams (1868–1952) – bandleader

== See also ==
- Landry Tomb, in Ascension Catholic Cemetery, Donaldsonville
- National Register of Historic Places listings in Ascension Parish, Louisiana
