= Ascension Parish, Louisiana =

Parish in Louisiana, United States

Ascension Parish
- Parish
- Parish of Ascension; Paroisse de l'Ascension (French); Parroquia de la Ascensión (Spanish)
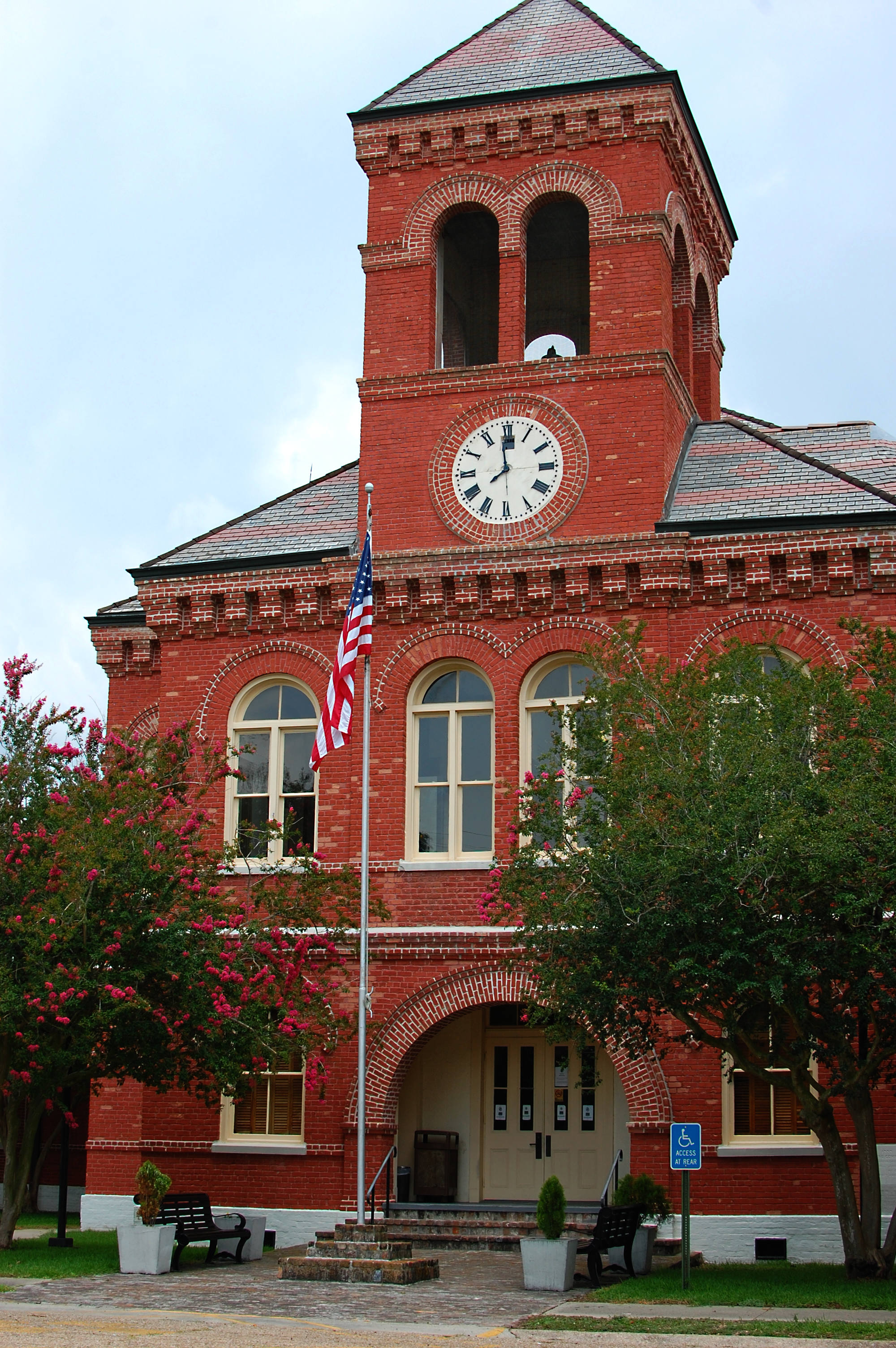
- Ascension Parish Courthouse in Donaldsonville

- Flag Seal Logo

- Location within the U.S. state of Louisiana
- Coordinates: 30°12′N 90°55′W
- Country: United States
- State: Louisiana
- Founded: 1807
- Named for: Ascension of Jesus Christ
- Seat: Donaldsonville
- Largest city: Prairieville

Area
  - Total: 303 sq mi (780 km^{2})
  - Land: 290 sq mi (750 km^{2})
  - Water: 13 sq mi (34 km^{2}) 3.75%

Population (2020)
  - Total: 126,500
  - Estimate (2025): 135,105 ▲
  - Density: 440/sq mi (170/km^{2})
- Time zone: UTC−6 (Central)
  - Summer (DST): UTC−5 (CDT)
- Congressional districts: 2nd, 6th
- Website: www.ascensionparish.net

Ascension Parish (French: Paroisse de l'Ascension; Spanish: Parroquia de la Ascensión) is a parish located in the U.S. state of Louisiana. As of the 2020 census, the population was 126,500. Its parish seat is Donaldsonville. The parish was created in 1807. Ascension Parish is part of the Baton Rouge metropolitan statistical area.

Ascension Parish is one of the 22 parishes that make up Acadiana, though it is not considered deep into the Cajun country. French or Cajun French language is rarely heard in the parish, though many festivals there are centered on Cajun or French cuisine including the Boucherie Festival, Lagniappe Music and Seafood Festival, Crawfish Festival, and the Jambalaya Festival. The largest incorporated city in Ascension Parish, Gonzales, is celebrated as the "Jambalaya Capital of the World".

== History ==
Early European settlers of the area that was developed as Ascension and Gonzales were, for the most part, of French and Spanish ancestry. They settled among the Houma Indians who lived in the area.

Among the projects and plans carried out by Luis de Unzaga 'le Conciliateur' while he was governor of Louisiana between 1769 and 1777 was the promotion of new settlements by Europeans, among them were French Acadians and Málaga in the fertile Mississippi region and more specifically in the Unzaga Post or 'Puesto de Unzaga' that he created in 1771 in Pointe Coupee, the parish of Saint Gabriel in 1773 and Fort Manchac in 1776; the Ascension people occupied land at the confluence of the aforementioned European settlements.

In 1863 Abraham Lincoln mentioned Ascension Parish in the Emancipation Proclamation as a confederate parish.

During the historic 2016 Louisiana Floods, around one-third of all homes in Ascension Parish were flooded; 15,000 homes and businesses took on water, mostly in the Galvez-St. Amant area, prompting a visit to St. Amant by then-presidential candidate, Donald Trump.

== Geography ==
According to the U.S. Census Bureau, the parish has a total area of 303 square miles (780 km^{2}), of which 290 square miles (750 km^{2}) is land and 13 square miles (34 km^{2}) (4.2%) is water. It is the fourth-smallest parish in Louisiana by total area.

=== Waterways ===
- Alligator Bayou
- Amite River
- Amite River Diversion Canal
- Anderson Canal
- Babin Canal
- Bayou Antoine
- Bayou Manchac
- Bayou Narcisse
- Bayou Pierre
- Bayou Reponds Pas
- Bayou Conway
- Bayou Francois
- Bayou Lafourche
- Bayou Napoleon
- Bayou Verret
- Bayou Vicknair
- Black Bayou
- Blind River
- Boudreau Bayou
- Boyle Bayou
- Braud Bayou
- Cocodrie Bayou
- Cotton Bayou
- Crowley Ditch
- Duckroost Bayou
- Flat Lake
- Grand Goudine Bayou
- Hackett Canal
- Heath Bayou
- Henderson Bayou
- Jim Bayou
- Johnson Bayou
- Lake Millet
- Lake Villars
- Laurel Ridge Canal
- McCall Bayou
- Mississippi River
- Muddy Creek
- New River
- New River Canal
- Old New River
- Panama Canal
- Pipeline Canal
- Rocky Canal
- Roddy Bayou
- Saveiro Canal
- Sides Bayou
- Smith Bayou
- Spanish Lake
- Welsh Gully

=== Major highways ===
- Interstate 10
- U.S. Highway 61
- Louisiana Highway 1
- Louisiana Highway 16
- Louisiana Highway 18
- Louisiana Highway 22
- Louisiana Highway 30
- Louisiana Highway 42
- Louisiana Highway 44
- Louisiana Highway 70
- Louisiana Highway 73
- Louisiana Highway 74
- Louisiana Highway 75
- Louisiana Highway 308
- Louisiana Highway 405
- Louisiana Highway 427
- Louisiana Highway 429
- Louisiana Highway 431
- Louisiana Highway 621
- Louisiana Highway 928
- Louisiana Highway 931
- Louisiana Highway 933
- Louisiana Highway 934
- Louisiana Highway 935
- Louisiana Highway 936
- Louisiana Highway 937
- Louisiana Highway 938
- Louisiana Highway 939
- Louisiana Highway 940
- Louisiana Highway 941
- Louisiana Highway 942
- Louisiana Highway 943
- Louisiana Highway 944
- Louisiana Highway 945
- Louisiana Highway 3038
- Louisiana Highway 3089
- Louisiana Highway 3120
- Louisiana Highway 3127
- Louisiana Highway 3251

=== Adjacent parishes ===
- East Baton Rouge Parish (north)
- Livingston Parish (northeast)
- St. John the Baptist Parish (east)
- St. James Parish (southeast)
- Assumption Parish (southwest)
- Iberville Parish (west)

== Communities ==
=== Cities ===
- Donaldsonville (parish seat)
- Gonzales

=== Town ===
- Sorrento

=== Census-designated places ===
- Darrow
- Lemannville
- Prairieville

=== Unincorporated communities ===
- Aben
- Acy
- Barmen
- Barton
- Belle Helene
- Bowden
- Brignac
- Brittany
- Brusly McCall
- Bullion
- Burnside
- Cofield
- Cornerview
- Duckroost
- Duplessis
- Dutchtown
- Galvez
- Geismar
- Hillaryville
- Hobart
- Hohen Solms
- Hope Villa
- Little Prairie
- McElroy
- Marchand
- Miles
- Modeste
- Mount Houmas
- Oak Grove
- Noel
- Palo Alto
- Philadelphia Point
- Saint Elmo
- Saint Amant
- Smoke Bend
- Southwood
- Weber City

== Demographics ==
Historical population
Census	Pop.	Note	%±
1810	2,219		—
1820	3,728		68.0%
1830	5,246		40.7%
1840	6,951		32.5%
1850	10,752		54.7%
1860	11,484		6.8%
1870	11,577		0.8%
1880	16,895		45.9%
1890	19,545		15.7%
1900	24,142		23.5%
1910	23,887		−1.1%
1920	22,155		−7.3%
1930	18,438		−16.8%
1940	21,215		15.1%
1950	22,387		5.5%
1960	27,927		24.7%
1970	37,086		32.8%
1980	50,068		35.0%
1990	58,214		16.3%
2000	76,627		31.6%
2010	107,215		39.9%
2020	126,500		18.0%
2025 (est.)	135,105	▲	6.8%
U.S. Decennial Census; 1790-1960 1900-1990; 1990-2000 2010-2019

Ascension Parish, Louisiana – Racial and ethnic composition Note: the US Census treats Hispanic/Latino as an ethnic category. This table excludes Latinos from the racial categories and assigns them to a separate category. Hispanics/Latinos may be of any race.
Race / Ethnicity (NH = Non-Hispanic)	Pop 1980	Pop 1990	Pop 2000	Pop 2010	Pop 2020	% 1980	% 1990	% 2000	% 2010	% 2020
White alone (NH)	37,672	43,818	58,378	75,949	79,645	75.24%	75.27%	76.18%	70.84%	62.96%
Black or African American alone (NH)	11,123	13,204	15,466	23,727	30,296	22.22%	22.68%	20.18%	22.13%	23.95%
Native American or Alaska Native alone (NH)	76	84	191	297	266	0.15%	0.14%	0.25%	0.28%	0.21%
Asian alone (NH)	82	152	249	995	1,681	0.16%	0.26%	0.32%	0.93%	1.33%
Native Hawaiian or Pacific Islander alone (NH)	x	x	18	61	32	x	x	0.02%	0.06%	0.03%
Other race alone (NH)	21	33	40	133	355	0.04%	0.06%	0.05%	0.12%	0.28%
Mixed race or Multiracial (NH)	x	x	402	1,029	3,842	x	x	0.52%	0.96%	3.04%
Hispanic or Latino (any race)	1,094	923	1,883	5,024	10,383	2.19%	1.59%	2.46%	4.69%	8.21%
Total	50,068	58,214	76,627	107,215	126,500	100.00%	100.00%	100.00%	100.00%	100.00%

In 1810, the parish had a population of 2,219; since then, its population has steadily increased despite some decades of population decline. In 1900, the parish's population reached a first historic high of 24,142 before increasing again to 58,214 at the 1990 U.S. census. At the 2010 census, Ascension Parish's population grew to 107,215; and at the 2020 United States census, there were 126,500 people, 44,267 households, and 32,305 families residing in the parish.

Having historic settlement by French and Spanish colonials during the periods of French and Spanish Louisiana, Ascension Parish's racial and ethnic composition has remained predominantly non-Hispanic white throughout a portion of its history. With the greater diversification of the United States at the 2020 census, non-Hispanic white residents were 62.96% of the total population. Black or African American Louisianians and others made up 23.95% of the population, followed by Hispanics or Latinos of any race (8.21%), Asians (1.33%), multiracial Americans (3.32%), Native Americans (0.21%), and Pacific Islanders (0.03%).

Among its residents at the 2021 American Community Survey's 1-year estimates program, households had a median income of $72,662 and mean income of $92,143. Families had a median income of $85,632; married-couple families $111,445; and non-family households $32,498. Overall, residents of Ascension Parish are wealthier than nearby East Baton Rouge Parish.

Religiously and spiritually, Christianity is the dominant religion for the parish. According to the Association of Religion Data Archives in 2020, the Roman Catholic Church was the single-largest Christian denomination for the parish, served primarily by the Roman Catholic Diocese of Baton Rouge. The overall Catholic population in Ascension Parish was 39,260 in 2020. Non-denominational or inter-denominational Christian churches—whether independent Bible churches, United and Uniting, etc.—were the second largest Christian group in the parish with 9,430 members. Collectively, Baptists throughout the Southern Baptist Convention, Full Gospel Baptist Church Fellowship, and National Baptist Convention of America made up 5,043 religious adherents. Parish-wide Protestant statistics reflect an increase in non- or inter-denominational Christianity throughout Louisiana, outgrowing Methodism as the second-largest Protestant group for the state per the Association of Religion Data Archives 2020 religion census; the growth of non/inter-denominational Christianity for the area represented a broader trend nationwide, where the movement began to constitute the largest segment of American Protestantism.

== Education ==
Ascension Parish School Board operates the local public schools. The parish is also home to private schools and—since 1998, to River Parishes Community College.

== Media ==
Two newspapers are based in Ascension Parish's two cities, Donaldsonville and Gonzales. The Gonzales Weekly Citizen is a bi-weekly newspaper formed after the merger of The Gonzales Weekly (founded 1920) and The Ascension Citizen (founded 1996). The Donaldsonville Chief, founded in 1871, is the parish's longest-continually-published newspaper.

== Law, government and politics ==
United States presidential election results for Ascension Parish, Louisiana
Year	Republican		Democratic		Third party(ies)	
Year	No.	%	No.	%	No.	%
1912	64	10.26%	413	66.19%	147	23.56%
1916	106	15.19%	531	76.07%	61	8.74%
1920	496	44.36%	622	55.64%	0	0.00%
1924	277	28.97%	679	71.03%	0	0.00%
1928	436	23.72%	1,402	76.28%	0	0.00%
1932	279	13.42%	1,800	86.58%	0	0.00%
1936	350	12.92%	2,359	87.05%	1	0.04%
1940	385	13.58%	2,451	86.42%	0	0.00%
1944	364	13.71%	2,291	86.29%	0	0.00%
1948	433	14.52%	1,126	37.75%	1,424	47.74%
1952	1,787	33.22%	3,593	66.78%	0	0.00%
1956	1,853	40.86%	2,606	57.46%	76	1.68%
1960	1,012	13.30%	5,689	74.76%	909	11.94%
1964	3,197	39.59%	4,879	60.41%	0	0.00%
1968	1,338	12.69%	3,203	30.37%	6,004	56.94%
1972	5,187	54.48%	3,324	34.91%	1,010	10.61%
1976	4,435	31.73%	9,100	65.10%	443	3.17%
1980	7,238	35.83%	12,381	61.29%	581	2.88%
1984	11,945	51.55%	11,048	47.68%	177	0.76%
1988	10,726	46.15%	12,147	52.27%	367	1.58%
1992	10,275	37.03%	13,036	46.98%	4,437	15.99%
1996	10,885	37.02%	15,263	51.91%	3,252	11.06%
2000	16,818	54.53%	13,385	43.40%	641	2.08%
2004	24,661	63.07%	13,955	35.69%	484	1.24%
2008	31,239	67.08%	14,625	31.40%	707	1.52%
2012	33,856	66.29%	16,349	32.01%	868	1.70%
2016	36,143	66.10%	16,476	30.13%	2,059	3.77%
2020	40,687	65.28%	20,399	32.73%	1,239	1.99%
2024	41,319	66.14%	20,113	32.19%	1,041	1.67%

On March 8, 2017, Ascension Parish President Kenneth Paul "Kenny" Matassa (born September 12, 1949), a Republican, along with Olin Glenn Berthelot (born August 1948), a Democratic businessman from Gonzales, faced indictment in an attempted bribery scheme. The pair is charged with encouraging a candidate to withdraw from a local election on November 8, 2016.

The grand jury released its true bill to Judge Tess Stromberg of the 23rd Judicial District Court in Ascension, Assumption, and St. James parishes. Among those who testified in the case were Democratic Gonzales City Council member Neal Bourqueat. Matassa and Berthelot allegedly bribed the Democrat A. Wayne Lawson with offers of money and a government job to drop out of the city council race in Division E against Bourque, who nevertheless won reelection with 61 percent of the ballots cast.

Matassa and Berthelot turned themselves in to authorities and posted a $5,000 bond. Reports, meanwhile, surfaced of a move before the parish council calling for Matassa to resign. He cannot be forced from the office, however, unless convicted of the crime. Matassa and Berthelot could have received up to two years in state prison either with or without hard time and/or a fine of $2,000. Matassa was instead acquitted in July 2018 of the election bribery allegations and returned to his duties as parish president with a legal cloud lifted from his shoulders.

== National Guard ==
The 922nd Engineer Company (Horizontal), a unit of the 769th Engineer Battalion and the 225th Engineer Brigade. The 1021st Vertical Engineer Company also resides in Gonzales, Louisiana.

== See also ==
- Acadian Coast
- National Register of Historic Places listings in Ascension Parish, Louisiana
- Johnny Berthelot
- Ralph Falsetta
- Eddie J. Lambert
- Sidney McCrory
- Edward J. Price
- Mert Smiley
