= 2023 Nicholls Colonels baseball team =

American college baseball season

2023 Nicholls Colonels baseball

Southland Conference regular season Champions Southland Conference tournament Champions

Tuscaloosa Regional
- Conference: Southland Conference
- Record: 34–24 (15–9 Southland)
- Head coach: Mike Silva (2nd season)
- Assistant coaches: Ladd Rhodes; Cody Livingston; Gabe Woods
- Home stadium: Ben Meyer Diamond at Ray E. Didier Field

2023 Southland Conference baseball standings
	Conf.				Overall
Team	W		L	PCT	W		L	PCT
Nicholls ‍†‍‡‍^{y}	15	–	9	.625	34	–	24	.586
Incarnate Word ‍‍‍	14	–	10	.583	28	–	26	.519
New Orleans ‍‍‍	13	–	11	.542	36	–	24	.600
Lamar ‍‍‍	13	–	11	.542	32	–	23	.582
McNeese ‍‍‍	12	–	12	.500	35	–	23	.603
Northwestern State ‍‍‍	12	–	12	.500	29	–	27	.518
Texas A&M–Corpus Christi ‍‍‍	12	–	12	.500	24	–	30	.444
Southeastern Louisiana ‍‍‍	9	–	14	.391	25	–	25	.500
Houston Christian ‍‍‍	7	–	16	.304	11	–	37	.229
† – Conference champion ‡ – Tournament champion y – Invited to the NCAA Tournament; As of June 3, 2023; Rankings from D1Baseball

The 2023 Nicholls Colonels baseball team represented Nicholls State University during the 2023 NCAA Division I baseball season. The Colonels played their home games at Ben Meyer Diamond at Ray E. Didier Field and were led by second–year head coach Mike Silva. They are members of the Southland Conference.

The Colonels had an overall season record of 34–24 and a conference record of 15–9 winning the Southland Conference regular season championship. They participated in the 2023 Southland Conference baseball tournament as the first seeded team. The Colonels won the tournament championship with a 4-0 record defeating McNeese 3–2, Lamar 4–0, New Orleans 5–3 and New Orleans 6–3. Winning the Southland Conference autobid, the Colonels played in the 2023 NCAA Division I baseball tournament Tuscaloosa Regional. They lost to 16th ranked Alabama 3–4 in the first game. The Colonels' season ended with a loss to Boston College 6–14 in the second game.

== Previous season ==
The Colonels had an overall season record of 26–25 and a conference record of 12–12 finishing tied for fourth place in the Southland Conference. They participated in the 2022 Southland Conference baseball tournament as the fourth seeded team. After winning their first conference tournament game against Northwestern State, the Colonels' season ended after losing to first seed McNeese and eighth seed Incarnate Word.

== Preseason ==
=== Southland Conference Coaches Poll ===
The Southland Conference Coaches Poll was released on February 3, 2023. Nicholls was picked to finish sixth in the Southland Conference with 59 votes.

Coaches poll
Predicted finish	Team	Votes (1st place)
1	McNeese State	118 (7)
2	Southeastern Louisiana	115 (10)
3	Lamar	88
4	New Orleans	87
5	Northwestern State	65 (1)
6	Nicholls	59
7	Texas A&M–Corpus Christi	55
8	Houston Christian	41
9	Incarnate Word	20

=== Preseason All-Southland team ===
Four Nicholls Colonels players were named to the conference preseason first team.

==== First Team ====
- Edgar Alvarez (NICH, JR, 1st Base)
- Brad Burckel (MCNS, SR, 2nd Base)
- Josh Leslie (MCNS, SR, 3rd Base)
- Parker Coddou (NICH, JR, Shortstop)
- Bo Willis (NWST, JR, Catcher)
- Tre Jones (TAMUCC, JR, Designated Hitter)
- Payton Harden (MCNS, SR, Outfielder)
- Brendan Ryan (TAMUCC, SR, Outfielder)
- Xane Washington (NICH, R-SR, Outfielder)
- Zach Garcia (TAMUCC, SO, Starting Pitcher)
- Grant Rogers (MCNS, JR, Starting Pitcher)
- Tyler Theriot (NICH, SR, Starting Pitcher)
- Burrell Jones (MCNS, SR, Relief Pitcher)
- Alec Carr (UIW, SR, Utility)

==== Second Team ====
- Josh Blankenship (LU, SR, 1st Base)
- Daunte Stuart (NWST, JR, 2nd Base)
- Kasten Furr (NO, JR, 3rd Base)
- Tyler Bischke (NO, JR, Shortstop)
- Bryce Grizzaffi (SELA, SR, Catcher)
- Kade Hunter (MCNS, SR, Designated Hitter)
- Josh Caraway (TAMUCC, JR, Outfielder)
- Braden Duhon (MCNS, JR, Outfielder)
- Issac Williams (NO, JR, Outfielder)
- Cal Carver (NWST, SR, Starting Pitcher)
- Tyler LeBlanc (NO, JR, Starting Pitcher)
- Will Kinzeler (SELA, JR, Starting Pitcher)
- Dalton Aspholm (SELA, SR, Relief Pitcher)
- Tre’ Obregon III (MCNS, SR, Utility)

== Roster ==
2023 Nicholls Colonels baseball team
Players
Coaches

#	Pos.	Name	B/T	Height	Weight	Year	Home town
1	INF	Jordan Thompson	R/R	6 ft 2 in (1.88 m)	183 lb (83 kg)	So	Moss Bluff, Louisiana
2	C	Kaden Amundson	R/R	5 ft 10 in (1.78 m)	180 lb (82 kg)	Fr	Otsego, Minnesota
3	RHP	Cade Evans	R/R	6 ft 1 in (1.85 m)	185 lb (84 kg)	Gr	Chattanooga, Tennessee
5	OF	Wes Toups	L/R	5 ft 10 in (1.78 m)	175 lb (79 kg)	RS So	Thibodaux, Louisiana
6	INF	Garrett Felix	L/R	5 ft 8 in (1.73 m)	180 lb (82 kg)	Jr	Lafayette, Louisiana
7	OF	Basiel Williams	R/R	6 ft 3 in (1.91 m)	195 lb (88 kg)	RS So	Hammond, Louisiana
8	OF	Xane Washington	R/R	6 ft 3 in (1.91 m)	195 lb (88 kg)	RS Sr	Houma, Louisiana
10	INF	Jayden Kay	R/R	6 ft 0 in (1.83 m)	210 lb (95 kg)	Jr	Billings, Montana
11	INF	MaCrae Kendrick	S/R	5 ft 8 in (1.73 m)	180 lb (82 kg)	Jr	Humble, Texas
12	RHP	Devin Desandro	R/R	5 ft 9 in (1.75 m)	185 lb (84 kg)	Jr	Thibodaux, Louisiana
13	RHP	Jacob Mayers	R/R	6 ft 5 in (1.96 m)	205 lb (93 kg)	Fr	Gonzales, Louisiana
14	LHP	Michael Quevedo	L/L	5 ft 11 in (1.8 m)	195 lb (88 kg)	So	Deltona, Florida
15	INF	Austin Cain	R/R	6 ft 3 in (1.91 m)	190 lb (86 kg)	Fr	Prairieville, Louisiana
16	RHP	Cole Poirrier	R/R	6 ft 2 in (1.88 m)	210 lb (95 kg)	Sr	St. Joseph, Illinois
17	RHP	Gavin Galy	R/R	6 ft 2 in (1.88 m)	175 lb (79 kg)	RS So	Orlando, Florida
18	C	Jaden Collura	L/R	5 ft 10 in (1.78 m)	192 lb (87 kg)	So	Hammond, Louisiana
19	LHP	Tyler Theriot	L/L	6 ft 2 in (1.88 m)	190 lb (86 kg)	Sr	Brusly, Louisiana
20	RHP	Arturo Rodriguez	R/R	5 ft 11 in (1.8 m)	203 lb (92 kg)	Jr	San Diego, California
21	INF	Cade Crosby	L/R	5 ft 11 in (1.8 m)	195 lb (88 kg)	Jr	Long Beach, Mississippi
22	LHP	Ryan Burt	L/L	6 ft 1 in (1.85 m)	210 lb (95 kg)	Jr	Columbus, Mississippi
23	OF	Hunter LeBlanc	L/L	6 ft 1 in (1.85 m)	195 lb (88 kg)	Sr	Luling, Louisiana
24	RHP	Nick Gales	R/R	5 ft 10 in (1.78 m)	190 lb (86 kg)	RS So	Troy, Missouri
25	INF	Edgar Alvarez	L/R	6 ft 4 in (1.93 m)	230 lb (104 kg)	Jr	Orlando, Florida
26	OF	Brayden Kuriger	R/R	6 ft 1 in (1.85 m)	195 lb (88 kg)	Fr	Gonzales, Louisiana
27	C	Kade Turnage	R/R	5 ft 1 in (1.55 m)	205 lb (93 kg)	Jr	Picayune, Mississippi
28	RHP	Chase Gearing	R/R	6 ft 5 in (1.96 m)	186 lb (84 kg)	Sr	Troy, Michigan
29	INF	Parker Coddou	L/R	5 ft 10 in (1.78 m)	164 lb (74 kg)	Jr	Thibodaux, Louisiana
30	RHP	Harper Jordan	R/R	6 ft 3 in (1.91 m)	195 lb (88 kg)	RS So	Hattiesburg, Mississippi
31	RHP	Nuno Parache	R/R	6 ft 1 in (1.85 m)	205 lb (93 kg)	So	Brooklyn, New York
32	LHP	Chat Hayes	L/L	5 ft 11 in (1.8 m)	200 lb (91 kg)	Jr	Grove, Oklahoma
33	INF	Erick Ordonez	R/R	5 ft 8 in (1.73 m)	170 lb (77 kg)	Jr	San Diego, California
34	INF	Gerardo Villareal	R/R	5 ft 10 in (1.78 m)	190 lb (86 kg)	Jr	Laredo, Texas
35	RHP	Barron Sawyer	R/R	6 ft 6 in (1.98 m)	235 lb (107 kg)	Fr	Lafayette, Louisiana
36	C	Lex Melancon	R/R	5 ft 6 in (1.68 m)	145 lb (66 kg)	Fr	Napoleonville, Louisiana
37	LHP	Luke Barbier	L/L	5 ft 10 in (1.78 m)	170 lb (77 kg)	RS So	Morgan City, Louisiana
38	RHP	Nico Saltaformaggio	R/R	6 ft 0 in (1.83 m)	198 lb (90 kg)	Jr	Destrehan, Louisiana
39	LHP	Bradley Ely	S/R	6 ft 2 in (1.88 m)	205 lb (93 kg)	Sr	Frisco, Texas
41	LHP	Chase Richter	L/L	6 ft 0 in (1.83 m)	205 lb (93 kg)	Jr	Cypress, Texas
42	LHP	Josh Mancuso	L/L	6 ft 5 in (1.96 m)	225 lb (102 kg)	Sr	Anderson, Texas
43	LHP	Alexander Llinas	L/L	5 ft 11 in (1.8 m)	215 lb (98 kg)	Fr	Pembroke Pines, Florida
44	RHP	Haden Luke	R/R	6 ft 2 in (1.88 m)	210 lb (95 kg)	Jr	Vicksburg, Mississippi
45	RHP	Trent Hillen	R/R	6 ft 3 in (1.91 m)	220 lb (100 kg)	So	Morgan City, Louisiana
47	C	Jordan Trapani	R/R	5 ft 5 in (1.65 m)	185 lb (84 kg)	Fr	Loranger, Louisiana

Head coach

Mike Silva (East Central)

Assistant coach(es)

Ladd Rhodes (Southern Mississippi)
Cody Livingston (Southern Mississippi)
Gabe Woods (Southeastern Louisiana)

Legend

- (C) Team captain
- (S) Suspended
- (I) Ineligible
- Injured
- Current redshirt

Roster
Last update: January 26, 2023

== Schedule and results ==
Legend
	Nicholls win
	Nicholls loss
	Postponement/Cancelation/Suspensions
**Bold**	Nicholls team member
*	Non-Conference game
†	Make-Up Game

2023 Nicholls Colonels baseball game log
Regular season (34–24)

February (5–4)
Date	Opponent	Rank	Site/stadium	Score	Win	Loss	Save	TV	Attendance	Overall record	SLC Record
Feb. 17	Lindenwood*		Ben Meyer Diamond at Ray E. Didier Field • Thibodaux, LA	4–0	**Theriot, Tyler (1-0)**	Salazar, Preston (0-1)		ESPN+	518	1–0	
Feb. 18	Lindenwood*		Ben Meyer Diamond at Ray E. Didier Field • Thibodaux, LA	2–3	Rakers, Easton (1-0)	**Mancuso, Josh (0-1)**			402	1–1	
Feb. 19	Lindenwood*		Ben Meyer Diamond at Ray E. Didier Field • Thibodaux, LA	8–3	**Mayers, Jacob (1-0)**	Stice, Bennett (0-1)			501	2–1	
Feb. 20	Lindenwood*		Ben Meyer Diamond at Ray E. Didier Field • Thibodaux, LA	9–2	**Llinas, Alexander (1-0)**	James, Matt (0-1)	**Saltaformaggio, Nico (1)**		492	3–1	
Feb. 22	at South Alabama*		Eddie Stanky Field • Mobile, AL	4–5	Willingham, Zach (2-0)	**Gearing, Chase (0-1)**	Lawrence, Colson (1)	ESPN+	1,084	3–2	
Feb. 24	at Louisiana Tech*		J. C. Love Field at Pat Patterson Park • Ruston, LA	1–11	FINCHER, Jonathan (1-1)	**Theriot, Tyler (1-1)**	()		2,030	3–3	
Feb. 25	at Louisiana Tech*		J. C. Love Field at Pat Patterson Park • Ruston, LA	2–3	HECTOR, Rawley (1-1)	**Desandro, Devin (1-1)**			2,084	3–4	
Feb. 26	at Louisiana Tech*		J. C. Love Field at Pat Patterson Park • Ruston, LA	8–0	**Mayers, Jacob (2-0)**	SMITH, Reed (0-1)			2,141	4–4	
Feb. 28	Southeastern Baptist College*		Ben Meyer Diamond at Ray E. Didier Field • Thibodaux, LA	10–2	**Jordan, Harper (1-0)**	Pascua, Bryce (0-1)			231	5–4	

March (11–8)
Date	Opponent	Rank	Site/stadium	Score	Win	Loss	Save	TV	Attendance	Overall record	SLC Record
Mar. 1	Southeastern Baptist College*		Ben Meyer Diamond at Ray E. Didier Field • Thibodaux, LA	20–0 (7 inn)	**Mancuso, Josh (1-0)**	Thompson, Matthew (0-1)				6–4	
Mar. 3	Memphis*		Ben Meyer Diamond at Ray E. Didier Field • Thibodaux, LA	2–3	FOWLER, DALTON (1-1)	**Theriot, Tyler (1-1)**	KENDRICK, DALTON (3)		204	6–5	
Mar. 4	Memphis*		Ben Meyer Diamond at Ray E. Didier Field • Thibodaux, LA	9–8	**Rodriguez, Arturo (1-0)**	ELLIS, LUKE (0-1)		ESPN+	713	7–5	
Mar. 5	Memphis*		Ben Meyer Diamond at Ray E. Didier Field • Thibodaux, LA	9–2	**Mayers, Jacob (3-0)**	GARNER, SETH (0-1)	**Evans, Cade (1)**	ESPN+	437	8–5	
Mar. 7	Penn*		Ben Meyer Diamond at Ray E. Didier Field • Thibodaux, LA	3–2	**Saltaformaggio, Nico (1-0)**	Millikan, Noah (0-1)	**Gearing, Chase (1)**	ESPN+	264	9–5	
Mar. 8	Penn*		Ben Meyer Diamond at Ray E. Didier Field • Thibodaux, LA	4–5	Cerwinski, John (1-0)	**Rodriguez, Arturo (1-1)**	Trop, Eli (1)	ESPN+	211	9–6	
Mar. 10	at Louisiana–Monroe*		Warhawk Field • Monroe, LA	8–0	**Theriot, Tyler (2-2)**	Barlow, Cam (1-2)			850	10–6	
Mar. 11	at Louisiana–Monroe*		Warhawk Field • Monroe, LA	7–3	**Desandro, Devin (1-1)**	Cressend, Cole (1-3)	**Evans, Cade (2)**		1,100	11–6	
Mar. 12	at Louisiana–Monroe*		Warhawk Field • Monroe, LA	0–5	Menard, Chipper (2-1)	**Mayers, Jacob (3-1)**			909	11–7	
Mar. 14	vs. Mississippi State*		MGM Park • Biloxi, MS	4–12	Tapper, Brock (1-0)	**Hayes, Chat (0-1)**			5,684	11–8	
Mar. 16	at Nebraska*		Haymarket Park • Lincoln, NE	Cancelled							
Mar. 17	at Nebraska*		Haymarket Park • Lincoln, NE	1–2	Olson, Emmett (3-1)	**Theriot, Tyler (2-3)**				11–9	
Mar. 18	at Nebraska*		Haymarket Park • Lincoln, NE	1–17	Kaminska, Jace (4-0)	**Desandro, Devin (1-2)**			217	11–10	
Mar. 19	at Nebraska*		Haymarket Park • Lincoln, NE	10–7	**Gearing, Chase (1-1)**	Garza, Michael (1-2)	**Evans, Cade (3)**		153	12–10	
Mar. 22	Mississippi Valley State*		Ben Meyer Diamond at Ray E. Didier Field • Thibodaux, LA	10–5	**Quevedo, Michael (1-0)**	VALENZUELA, ISAIAH (1-3)			203	13–10	
Mar. 24	at McNeese		Joe Miller Ballpark • Lake Charles, LA	3–8	Rogers, Grant (6-0)	**Theriot, Tyler (2-4)**			1,020	13–11	0–1
Mar. 25	at McNeese		Joe Miller Ballpark • Lake Charles, LA	8–6 (12 inn)	**Saltaformaggio, Nico (2-0)**	Vega, Christian (2-1)			1,320	14–11	1–1
Mar. 26	at McNeese		Joe Miller Ballpark • Lake Charles, LA	8–5	**Mancuso, Josh (2-1)**	Voss, Zach (1-3)	**Saltaformaggio, Nico (2)**		1,068	15–11	2–1
Mar. 29	South Alabama*		Ben Meyer Diamond at Ray E. Didier Field • Thibodaux, LA	8–10 (10 inn.)	Wood, Grant (4-1)	**Rodriguez, Arturo (1-2)**		ESPN+	313	15–12	
Mar. 31	at Lamar		Vincent–Beck Stadium • Beaumont, TX	9–8 (19 inn)	**Jordan, Harper (2-0)**	Cole, Daniel (0-2)		ESPN+	1,491	16–12	3–1

April (8–6)
Date	Opponent	Rank	Site/stadium	Score	Win	Loss	Save	TV	Attendance	Overall record	SLC Record
Apr. 1	at Lamar		Vincent–Beck Stadium • Beaumont, TX	7–9	Hesseltine, Hunter (1-1)	**Desandro, Devin (1-3)**	Tauzin, Kole (1)	ESPN+	1,362	16–13	3–2
Apr. 2	at Lamar		Vincent–Beck Stadium • Beaumont, TX	4–2	**Mayers, Jacob (4-1)**	Rivera, Jeremy (1-1)	**Evans, Cade (4)**	ESPN+	1,258	17–13	4–2
Apr. 4	at LSU*	1	Alex Box Stadium, Skip Bertman Field • Baton Rouge, LA	2–12 (7 inn)	Evans, Cade (4)	**Poirrier, Cole (0-1)**		SECN+	10,544	17–14	
Apr. 6	Incarnate Word		Ben Meyer Diamond at Ray E. Didier Field • Thibodaux, LA	8–9	Rodriguez, Luis (1-2)	**Evans, Cade (0-1)**	Hayward, Steve (3)	ESPN+	165	17–15	4–3
Apr. 6	Incarnate Word		Ben Meyer Diamond at Ray E. Didier Field • Thibodaux, LA	8–1	**Quevedo, Michael (2-0)**	Higdon, Seth (0-4)			107	18–15	5–3
Apr. 8	Incarnate Word		Ben Meyer Diamond at Ray E. Didier Field • Thibodaux, LA	3–8	Zavala, Isaiah (5-0)	**Saltaformaggio, Nico (2-1)**	Berens, Micah (1)	ESPN+	534	18–16	5–4
Apr. 11	Southern		Ben Meyer Diamond at Ray E. Didier Field • Thibodaux, LA	Cancelled							
Apr. 12	at Southern		Lee–Hines Field • Baton Rouge, LA	Cancelled							
Apr. 18	Mississippi Valley State*		Ben Meyer Diamond at Ray E. Didier Field • Thibodaux, LA	12–3	**Desandro, Devin (2-3)**	SNIPES, JAMES (0-4)		ESPN+	311	19–16	
Apr. 21	Houston Christian		Ben Meyer Diamond at Ray E. Didier Field • Thibodaux, LA	16–7	**Galy, Gavin (1-0)**	Wells, Jarek (0-3)		ESPN+	721	20–16	6–4
Apr. 22	Houston Christian		Ben Meyer Diamond at Ray E. Didier Field • Thibodaux, LA	13–5	**Quevedo, Michael (3-0)**	Zander, Walker (1-4)	**Jordan, Harper (1)**	ESPN+	501	21–16	7–4
Apr. 23	Houston Christian		Ben Meyer Diamond at Ray E. Didier Field • Thibodaux, LA	6– 5	**Mayers, Jacob (5-1)**	Ripoll, Will (0-3)		ESPN+	613	22–16	8–4
Apr. 25	at LSU*	1	Alex Box Stadium, Skip Bertman Field • Baton Rouge, LA	6–5	**Saltaformaggio, Nico (3-1)**	Bryce Collins (2-1)	**Evans, Cade (5)**	SECN+	10,204	23–16	
Apr. 28	at Northwestern State		H. Alvin Brown–C. C. Stroud Field • Natchitoches, LA	2–4	Carver, Cal (5-2)	**Desandro, Devin (2-4)**	Froehlich, Kyle (5)	ESPN+	912	23–17	8–5
Apr. 29	at Northwestern State		H. Alvin Brown–C. C. Stroud Field • Natchitoches, LA	4–7	Makarewich, Alex (5-3)	**Quevedo, Michael (3-1)**	Froehlich, Kyle (6)	ESPN+	878	23–18	8–6
Apr. 30	at Northwestern State		H. Alvin Brown–C. C. Stroud Field • Natchitoches, LA	9–5	**Mayers, Jacob (6-1)**	Brown, Drayton (3-6)		ESPN+		24–18	9–6

May (6–4)
Date	Opponent	Rank	Site/stadium	Score	Win	Loss	Save	TV	Attendance	Overall record	SLC Record
May 5	Southeastern Louisiana		Ben Meyer Diamond at Ray E. Didier Field • Thibodaux, LA	13–7	**Saltaformaggio, Nico (4-1)**	Aspholm, Dalton (0-3)		ESPN+	847	25–18	10–6
May 6	Southeastern Louisiana		Ben Meyer Diamond at Ray E. Didier Field • Thibodaux, LA	6–5 (11 inn)	**Saltaformaggio, Nico (5-1)**	Lauve, Lance (2-3)		ESPN+	554	26–18	11–6
May 7	Southeastern Louisiana		Ben Meyer Diamond at Ray E. Didier Field • Thibodaux, LA	9–0	**Mayers, Jacob (7-1)**	Stuprich, Brennan (3-5)		ESPN+	554	27–18	12–6
May 9	McNeese		Ben Meyer Diamond at Ray E. Didier Field • Thibodaux, LA	3–7	Barthelemy, Brock (3-0)	**Evans, Cade (0-2)**		ESPN+	207	27–19	
May 12	Texas A&M–Corpus Christi		Ben Meyer Diamond at Ray E. Didier Field • Thibodaux, LA	4–9	Watson, Matthew (6-3)	**Rodriguez, Arturo (1-3)**	Thomas, Hayden (2)	ESPN+	501	27–20	12–7
May 13	Texas A&M–Corpus Christi		Ben Meyer Diamond at Ray E. Didier Field • Thibodaux, LA	7–2	**Mayers, Jacob (8-1)**	Purcell, Colin (4-6)	**Saltaformaggio, Nico (3)**	ESPN+	531	28–20	13–7
May 14	Texas A&M–Corpus Christi		Ben Meyer Diamond at Ray E. Didier Field • Thibodaux, LA	9–6	**Gearing, Chase (2-1)**	Garcia, Zach (2-4)	**Evans, Cade (6)**	ESPN+	545	29–20	14–7
May 18	at New Orleans		Maestri Field at Privateer Park • New Orleans, LA	6–7	Mitchell, Brandon (10-3)	**Desandro, Devin (2-5)**	Mead, Jacob (4)	ESPN+	1,102	29–21	14–8
May 19	at New Orleans		Maestri Field at Privateer Park • New Orleans, LA	10–4	**Gearing, Chase (3-1)**	Seroski, Caleb (3-1)		ESPN+	1,005	30–21	15–8
May 20	at New Orleans		Maestri Field at Privateer Park • New Orleans, LA	4–14 (8 inn)	Williams, Jack (3-0)	**Quevedo, Michael (3-2)**		ESPN+	1,279	30–22	15–9

Postseason (4–2)

Southland Tournament (4–0)
Date	Opponent	(Seed)/Rank	Site/stadium	Score	Win	Loss	Save	TV	Attendance	Overall record	Tournament record
May 24	vs. (6) McNeese	(1)	Joe Miller Ballpark • Lake Charles, LA	3–2 (14 inn)	**Galy, Gavin (2-0)**	Cherry, Derrick (3-3)		ESPN+	757	31–22	1–0
May 25	vs. (3) Lamar	(1)	Joe Miller Ballpark • Lake Charles, LA	4–0	**Mayers, Jacob (9-1)**	Hesseltine, Hunter (4-2)		ESPN+		32–22	2–0
May 26	vs. (4) New Orleans	(1)	Joe Miller Ballpark • Lake Charles, LA	5–3	**Theriot, Tyler (3-4)**	Williams, Jack (3-1)	**Galy, Gavin (1)**	ESPN+		33–22	3–0
May 27	vs. (4) New Orleans	(1)	Joe Miller Ballpark • Lake Charles, LA	6–3	**Quevedo, Michael (4-2)**	Mead, Jacob (1-1)	**Evans, Cade (7)**	ESPN+	443	34–22	4–0

NCAA Division I Tournament (0–2)
Date	Opponent	(Seed)/Rank	Site/stadium	Score	Win	Loss	Save	TV	Attendance	Overall record	Tournament record
Jun 2	vs. (1)/16 Alabama	(4)	Sewell–Thomas Stadium • Tuscaloosa, AL	3–4	Alton Davis II (1-2)	**Saltaformaggio, Nico (5-2)**		ESPN+	5,800	34–23	0–1
Jun 3	vs. (2) Boston College	(4)	Sewell–Thomas Stadium • Tuscaloosa, AL	6–14	Henry Leake(5-5)	**Gearing, Chase(3-2)**	A.J. Colarusso (1)	ESPN+	4.628	34–24	0–2

Schedule source:

*Rankings are based on the team's current ranking in the D1Baseball poll.
