= 2023 Southland Conference baseball tournament =

Baseball tournament

- Teams: 7
- Format: Double-elimination tournament
- Finals site: Joe Miller Ballpark; Lake Charles, Louisiana
- Champions: Nicholls (2nd title)
- Winning coach: Mike Silva (1st title)
- MVP: Xane Washington (Nicholls)
- Television: ESPN+

2023 Southland Conference baseball standings
	Conf.				Overall
Team	W		L	PCT	W		L	PCT
Nicholls ‍†‍‡‍^{y}	15	–	9	.625	34	–	24	.586
Incarnate Word ‍‍‍	14	–	10	.583	28	–	26	.519
New Orleans ‍‍‍	13	–	11	.542	36	–	24	.600
Lamar ‍‍‍	13	–	11	.542	32	–	23	.582
McNeese ‍‍‍	12	–	12	.500	35	–	23	.603
Northwestern State ‍‍‍	12	–	12	.500	29	–	27	.518
Texas A&M–Corpus Christi ‍‍‍	12	–	12	.500	24	–	30	.444
Southeastern Louisiana ‍‍‍	9	–	14	.391	25	–	25	.500
Houston Christian ‍‍‍	7	–	16	.304	11	–	37	.229
† – Conference champion ‡ – Tournament champion y – Invited to the NCAA Tournament; As of June 3, 2023; Rankings from D1Baseball

The 2023 Southland Conference tournament was held at Joe Miller Ballpark on the campus of McNeese State University in Lake Charles, Louisiana, from May 23 through 27, 2023. The tournament winner, Nicholls, earned the Southland Conference's automatic bid to the 2023 NCAA Division I baseball tournament.

== Format ==
Seven teams competed with the sixth and seventh seeded teams playing an elimination game. No teams receive a bye.

== Seeds ==
Teams were seeded by record within the conference, with a tie–breaker system to seed teams with identical conference records. The top seven teams in the conference qualified for the tournament.

Seed	School	Conference	Tie-breaker #1	Tie-breaker #2
1	Nicholls	15–9		
2	Incarnate Word	14–10		
3	Lamar	13–11	2–1 conference record vs New Orleans	
4	New Orleans	13–11	1–2 conference record vs Lamar	
5	Northwestern State	12–12	3–3 record vs McNeese and Texas A&M–Corpus Christi	2–1 conference record vs No. 1 seed Nicholls
6	McNeese	12–12	3–3 record vs Northwestern State and Texas A&M–Corpus Christi	2–1 record vs Texas A&M–Corpus Christi
7	Texas A&M–Corpus Christi	12–12	3–3 record vs McNeese and Northwestern State	1–2 record vs McNeese

== Tournament ==
Round	Game	Time*	Matchup	Score	Attendance	Notes	Television
Single Elimination – Tuesday, May 23, 2023
SE	1	6:00 pm	No. 6 McNeese vs. No. 7 Texas A&M–Corpus Christi	4–0	884	Texas A&M–Corpus Christi eliminated	ESPN+
First Round – Wednesday, May 24, 2023
1	3	11:00 am	No. 2 Incarnate Word vs. No. 5 Northwestern State	1–2	Not recorded		ESPN+
1	4	2:30 pm	No. 3 Lamar vs. No. 4 New Orleans	1–4	Not recorded		ESPN+
1	2	6:00 pm	No. 1 Nicholls vs. No. 6 McNeese	3–2 _{(14)}	757		ESPN+
Second Round – Thursday, May 25, 2023
2	5	11:00 am	No. 6 McNeese vs. No. 2 Incarnate Word	3–0	Not recorded	Incarnate Word eliminated	ESPN+
2	6	2:30 pm	No. 1 Nicholls vs. No. 3 Lamar	4–0	Not recorded	Lamar eliminated	ESPN+
2	7	6:00 pm	No. 5 Northwestern State vs. No. 4 New Orleans	3–4	629		ESPN+
Third Round – Thursday, May 26, 2023
3	8	11:00 am	No. 1 Nicholls vs. No. 4 New Orleans	5–3	Not recorded		ESPN+
3	9	2:30 pm	No. 5 Northwestern State vs. No. 6 McNeese	6–2	Not recorded	McNeese eliminated	ESPN+
3	10	6:00 pm	No. 4 New Orleans vs. No. 5 Northwestern State	7–3	633	Northwestern State eliminated	ESPN+
Championship – Saturday, May 27, 2023
4	11	1:00 pm	No. 1 Nicholls vs. No. 4 New Orleans	6–3	443	Nicholls wins championship	ESPN+
4	12		Rematch (not necessary)	–			ESPN+
*Game times in CDT. #-Rankings denote tournament seeding.

== Bracket and results ==
=== Single elimination round ===
Tuesday, May 23
Team	R
No. 7 Texas A&M-Corpus Christi	0
No. 6 McNeese	4

=== Main bracket ===
First round
1	Nicholls	3
6	McNeese	2^{14}
2	Incarnate Word	1
5	Northwestern State	2
3	Lamar	1
4	New Orleans	4

Second round
6	McNeese	3
2	Incarnate Word	0
1	Nicholls	4
3	Lamar	0
5	Northwestern State	3
4	New Orleans	4
1	Nicholls	5
4	New Orleans	3

Third round
5	Northwestern State	6
6	McNeese	2
4	New Orleans	7
5	Northwestern State	3

Final
1	Nicholls	6
4	New Orleans	3

== Awards and honors ==
Tournament MVP: Xane Washington, Nicholls

All-Tournament Teams:

Xane Washington, Nicholls
Jacob Mayer, Nicholls
Edgar Alvarez, Nicholls
Kaden Amundsen, Nicholls
Brandon Mitchell, New Orleans
Tyler Bischke, New Orleans
Jorge Tejeda, New Orleans
Issac Williams, New Orleans
Bo Willis, Northwestern State
Broch Holmes, Northwestern State
Josh Leslie, McNeese
Grant Rogers, McNeese

== See also ==
2023 Southland Conference softball tournament
