= 2023 Texas A&M–Corpus Christi Islanders baseball team =

American college baseball season

2023 Texas A&M–Corpus Christi Islanders baseball
- Conference: Southland Conference
- Record: 24–30 (12–12 Southland)
- Head coach: Scott Malone (16th season)
- Assistant coaches: Matt Parker; Scott Kelly; Noe Ruiz, Jr.
- Home stadium: Chapman Field

2023 Southland Conference baseball standings
	Conf.				Overall
Team	W		L	PCT	W		L	PCT
Nicholls ‍†‍‡‍^{y}	15	–	9	.625	34	–	24	.586
Incarnate Word ‍‍‍	14	–	10	.583	28	–	26	.519
New Orleans ‍‍‍	13	–	11	.542	36	–	24	.600
Lamar ‍‍‍	13	–	11	.542	32	–	23	.582
McNeese ‍‍‍	12	–	12	.500	35	–	23	.603
Northwestern State ‍‍‍	12	–	12	.500	29	–	27	.518
Texas A&M–Corpus Christi ‍‍‍	12	–	12	.500	24	–	30	.444
Southeastern Louisiana ‍‍‍	9	–	14	.391	25	–	25	.500
Houston Christian ‍‍‍	7	–	16	.304	11	–	37	.229
† – Conference champion ‡ – Tournament champion y – Invited to the NCAA Tournament; As of June 3, 2023; Rankings from D1Baseball

The 2023 Texas A&M–Corpus Christi Islanders baseball team represented Texas A&M University–Corpus Christi during the 2023 NCAA Division I baseball season. The Islanders played their home games at Chapman Field. They were led by sixteenth–year head coach Scott Malone and are members of the Southland Conference.

== Preseason ==
=== Southland Conference Coaches Poll ===
The Southland Conference Coaches Poll was released on February 3, 2023. Texas A&M-Corpus Christi was picked to finish seventh in the Southland Conference with 55 votes.

Coaches poll
Predicted finish	Team	Votes (1st place)
1	McNeese State	118 (7)
2	Southeastern Louisiana	115 (10)
3	Lamar	88
4	New Orleans	87
5	Northwestern State	65 (1)
6	Nicholls	59
7	Texas A&M–Corpus Christi	55
8	Houston Christian	41
9	Incarnate Word	20

=== Preseason All-Southland team ===
Three Texas A&M-Corpus Christi players were named to the conference preseason first team. One player was named to the conference preseason second team.

==== First Team ====
- Edgar Alvarez (NICH, JR, 1st Base)
- Brad Burckel (MCNS, SR, 2nd Base)
- Josh Leslie (MCNS, SR, 3rd Base)
- Parker Coddou (NICH, JR, Shortstop)
- Bo Willis (NWST, JR, Catcher)
- Tre Jones (TAMUCC, JR, Designated Hitter)
- Payton Harden (MCNS, SR, Outfielder)
- Brendan Ryan (TAMUCC, SR, Outfielder)
- Xane Washington (NICH, R-SR, Outfielder)
- Zach Garcia (TAMUCC, SO, Starting Pitcher)
- Grant Rogers (MCNS, JR, Starting Pitcher)
- Tyler Theriot (NICH, SR, Starting Pitcher)
- Burrell Jones (MCNS, SR, Relief Pitcher)
- Alec Carr (UIW, SR, Utility)

==== Second Team ====
- Josh Blankenship (LU, SR, 1st Base)
- Daunte Stuart (NWST, JR, 2nd Base)
- Kasten Furr (NO, JR, 3rd Base)
- Tyler Bischke (NO, JR, Shortstop)
- Bryce Grizzaffi (SELA, SR, Catcher)
- Kade Hunter (MCNS, SR, Designated Hitter)
- Josh Caraway (TAMUCC, JR, Outfielder)
- Braden Duhon (MCNS, JR, Outfielder)
- Issac Williams (NO, JR, Outfielder)
- Cal Carver (NWST, SR, Starting Pitcher)
- Tyler LeBlanc (NO, JR, Starting Pitcher)
- Will Kinzeler (SELA, JR, Starting Pitcher)
- Dalton Aspholm (SELA, SR, Relief Pitcher)
- Tre’ Obregon III (MCNS, SR, Utility)

== Schedule and results ==
Legend
	Texas A&M–Corpus Christi win
	Texas A&M–Corpus Christi loss
	Postponement/Cancelation/Suspensions
**Bold**	Texas A&M–Corpus Christi team member
*	Non-Conference game
†	Make-Up Game

2023 Texas A&M–Corpus Christi Islanders baseball game log
Regular season (24–30)

February (3–5)
Date	Opponent	Rank	Site/stadium	Score	Win	Loss	Save	TV	Attendance	Overall record	SLC Record
Feb. 17	UT Arlington*		Chapman Field • Corpus Christi, TX	11–6	**Purcell, Colin (1-0)**	Novis, Matt (0-1)		ESPN+	401	1–0	
Feb. 18	UT Arlington*		Chapman Field • Corpus Christi, TX	6–1	**Thomas, Hayden (1-0)**	Hackett, Bryce (0-1)	**Ramirez Jr., Jaime (1)**	ESPN+	412	2–0	
Feb. 19	UT Arlington*		Chapman Field • Corpus Christi, TX	3–5	Noah, Caden (1-0)	**Watson, Matthew (0-1)**	**Peters, Connery (1)**	ESPN+	371	2–1	
Feb. 21	Texas*		UFCU Disch–Falk Field • Austin, TX	2–12	Johnson, Lebarron (1-1)	**Garcia, Zach (0-1)**	()	LHN	6,388	2–2	
Kleberg Bank College Classic
Feb. 24	vs. Incarnate Word*		Whataburger Field • Corpus Christi, TX	4–10	Cassidy, Kayden (1-1)	**Thomas, Hayden (1-1)**		FloBaseball	883	2–3	
Feb. 25	Houston*		Whataburger Field • Corpus Christi, TX	12–2 (7 inn)	**Hendricks, Evans (1-0)**	WRIGHT, Dan (0-1)		FloBaseball	1,016	3–3	
Feb. 26	Utah*		Whataburger Field • Corpus Christi, TX	6–7	Van Sickle, Bryson (1-1)	**Trimble, James (0-1)**		FloBaseball	863	3–4	
Feb. 27	Utah*		Chapman Field • Corpus Christi, TX	3–6	Clarkson, TJ (1-0)	**Ramirez Jr., Jaime (0-1)**	Ashman, Micah (1)	ESPN+	265	3–5	

March (10–9)
Date	Opponent	Rank	Site/stadium	Score	Win	Loss	Save	TV	Attendance	Overall record	SLC Record
Mar. 3	Lindenwood*		Chapman Field • Corpus Christi, TX	4–0	**Thomas, Hayden (2-1)**	(–)Salazar, Preston (0-3)	**Hendricks, Evans (1)**	ESPN+	319	4–5	
Mar. 4	Lindenwood*		Chapman Field • Corpus Christi, TX	13–0 (7 inn)	**Garcia, Zach (1–1)**	Brown, Eli (0–2)				5–5	
Mar. 4	Lindenwood*		Chapman Field • Corpus Christi, TX	7–6 (10 inn)	**Burchett, James (1-0)**	Subbert, Carson (0-1)			332	6–5	
Mar. 5	Lindenwood*		Chapman Field • Corpus Christi, TX	8–0	**Purcell, Colin (2-0)**	Stice, Bennett (1-2)			287	7–5	
Mar. 8	Texas Southern*		Chapman Field • Corpus Christi, TX	13–14	Mateo Lamas (2-0)	**Burchett, James (1-1)**	Abraham Deleon (1)		348	7–6	
Mar. 10	at UTSA*		Roadrunner Field • San Antonio, TX	6–10	MALONE, Luke (1-2)	**Thomas, Hayden (2-2)**	SHAFER, Daniel (2)		564	7–7	
Mar. 11	at UTSA*		Roadrunner Field • San Antonio, TX	6–31	QUIROGA, Ulises (3-0)	**Garcia, Zach (1-2)**			537	7–8	
Mar. 12	at UTSA*		Roadrunner Field • San Antonio, TX	6–9	RIOJAS, Ruger (2-0)	**Feltz, Samuel (0-1)**	MILLER, Simon (2)		562	7–9	
South Texas Showdown presented by NavyArmy Community Credit Union
Mar. 14	at Texas–Rio Grande Valley*		UTRGV Baseball Stadium • Edinburg, TX	5–4	**Watson, Matthew (1-1)**	Ariza, JC (0-2)	**Dean, Austin (1)**	ESPN+		8–9	
Mar. 16	Harvard*		Chapman Field • Corpus Christi, TX	24–3 (7 inn)	**Thomas, Hayden (3-2)**	Fang, Callan (0-2)		ESPN+	319	9–9	
Mar. 17	Harvard*		Chapman Field • Corpus Christi, TX	5–4	**Dean, Austin (1-0)**	Stovern, Harrison (1-2)		ESPN+	292	10–9	
Mar. 18	Harvard*		Chapman Field • Corpus Christi, TX	3–7	Clark, Chris (1-1)	**Watson, Matthew (1-2)**		ESPN+	285	10–10	
Mar. 18	Harvard*		Chapman Field • Corpus Christi, TX	5–3	**Dean, Austin (2-0)**	Jacobsen, Will (0-2)	**Hendricks, Evans (2)**	ESPN+	307	11–10	
Mar. 21	at Texas State*		Bobcat Baseball Stadium • San Marcos, TX	5–7	Smith, Austin (1-1)	**Ramirez Jr., Jaime (0-2)**	Keithley, Carson (1)	ESPN+	1,284	11–11	
Mar. 24	Southeastern Louisiana		Chapman Field • Corpus Christi, TX	4–10	Stuprich, Brennan (2-2)	**Thomas, Hayden (3-3)**		ESPN+	346	11–12	0–1
Mar. 25	Southeastern Louisiana		Chapman Field • Corpus Christi, TX	5–7	Reynolds, Reid (1-0)	**Purcell, Colin (2-1)**	Lauve, Lance (2)	ESPN+	321	11–13	0–2
Mar. 26	Southeastern Louisiana		Chapman Field • Corpus Christi, TX	3–1	**Ramirez Jr., Jaime (1-2)**	Landry, Andrew (2-3)	**Dean, Austin (2)**	ESPN+	319	12–13	1–2
Mar. 28	UTSA*		Chapman Field • Corpus Christi, TX	8–2	**Watson, Matthew (2-2)**	WARD, Ryan (0-1)		ESPN+	379	13–13	
Mar. 31	at Abilene Christian*		Crutcher Scott Field • Abilene, TX	7–9	Morgan, T. (2-1)	**Ramirez Jr., Jaime (1-3)**	Anderson, B. (3)		210	13–14	

April (7–9)
Date	Opponent	Rank	Site/stadium	Score	Win	Loss	Save	TV	Attendance	Overall record	SLC Record
Apr. 1	vs. Nebraska*		Crutcher Scott Field • Abilene, TX	1–12 (8 inn)	Olson, Emmett (5-1)	**Purcell, Colin (2-3)**			213	13–15	
Apr. 2	at Abilene Christian*		Crutcher Scott Field • Abilene, TX	9–10	Anderson, B. (4-0)	**Dean, Austin (2-1)**			382	13–16	
South Texas Showdown Presented by NavyArmy Community Credit Union
Apr. 2	at Texas-Rio Grande Valley*		UTRGV BaseballStadium • Edinburg, TX	2–20 (7 inn)	Massey, Kris (1-0)	**Villegas, Nash (0-1)**			1,312	13–17	
Apr. 7	at McNeese		Joe Miller Ballpark • Lake Charles, LA	3–8	Rogers, Grant (8-0)	**Watson, Matthew (2-3)**				13–18	1–3
Apr. 7	at McNeese		Joe Miller Ballpark • Lake Charles, LA	5–3	**Dickey, Kyle (1-0)**	Cherry, Derrick (3-2)	**Dean, Austin (3)**		1,042	14–18	2–3
Apr. 8	at McNeese		Joe Miller Ballpark • Lake Charles, LA	3–4	Jones, Burrell (3-0)	**Purcell, Colin (2-3)**	Moeller, JT (1)	ESPN+	1,076	14–19	2–4
South Texas Showdown presented by NavyArmy Community Credit Union
Apr. 11	Texas-Rio Grande Valley*		Chapman Field • Corpus Christi, TX	2–11	Garza, Randy (2-1)	**Thomas, Hayden (3-4)**		ESPN+	439	14–20	
Apr. 14	New Orleans		Chapman Field • Corpus Christi, TX	6–7	Delorbe, Ryan (2-0)	**Dickey, Kyle (1-1)**		ESPN+	318	14–21	2–5
Apr. 15	New Orleans		Chapman Field • Corpus Christi, TX	5–3	**Purcell, Colin (3-3**)	Mitchell, Brandon (6-3)	Dean, Austin (4)	ESPN+	388	15–21	3–5
Apr. 16	New Orleans		Chapman Field • Corpus Christi, TX	7–5	**Hendricks, Evans (2-0)**	Mercer, Colton (2-3)	**Thomas, Hayden (1)**	ESPN+	352	16–21	4–5
Apr. 18	University of Houston–Victoria*		Chapman Field • Corpus Christi, TX	Cancelled							
Apr. 21	at Lamar		Vincent–Beck Stadium • Beaumont, TX	4–3	**Watson, Matthew (3-3)**	Cleveland, J (3-4)	Dean, Austin (5)	ESPN+	1,476	17–21	5–5
Apr. 22	at Lamar		Vincent–Beck Stadium • Beaumont, TX	0–10	Ellis, Jacob (3-2)	**Purcell, Colin (3-4)**		ESPN+	1,366	17–22	5–6
Apr. 23	at Lamar		Vincent–Beck Stadium • Beaumont, TX	7–5 (11 inn)	**Garcia, Zach (2-2)**	Tauzin, Kole (2-2)	**Dickey, Kyle (1)**	ESPN+	1,668	18–22	6–6
Apr. 26	at UT Arlington*		Clay Gould Ballpark • Arlington, TX	Cancelled							
Apr. 28	at Houston Christian		Husky Field • Houston, TX	12–7	**Watson, Matthew (4-3)**	Gunter, Rye (1-3)		ESPN+	350	19–22	7–6
Apr. 29	at Houston Christian		Husky Field • Houston, TX	6–7	Zander, Walker (2-4)	**Purcell, Colin (3-5)**	Austin, Morris (2)	ESPN+	250	19–23	7–7
Apr. 30	at Houston Christian		Husky Field • Houston, TX	7–2	**Hendricks, Evans (3-0)**	Ripoll, Will (0-4)		ESPN+	300	20–23	8–7

May (4–6)
Date	Opponent	Rank	Site/stadium	Score	Win	Loss	Save	TV	Attendance	Overall record	SLC Record
May 3	at Baylor*		Baylor Ballpark • Waco, TX	6–12	Needham, Anderson (1-1)	**Garcia, Zach (2-3)**		ESPN+	1,707	20–24	
May 5	Northwestern State		Chapman Field • Corpus Christi, TX	11–8	**Watson, Matthew (5-3)**	Carver, Cal (5-3)	()		327	21–24	9–7
May 6	Northwestern State		Chapman Field • Corpus Christi, TX	4–1	**Purcell, Colin (4-5)**	Makarewich, Alex (5-4)	**Garcia, Zach (1)**		340	22–24	10–7
May 7	Northwestern State		Chapman Field • Corpus Christi, TX	8–17	Brown, Drayton (4-6)	**Dean, Austin (2-2)**			287	22–25	10–8
May 12	at Nicholls		Ben Meyer Diamond at Ray E. Didier Field • Thibodaux, LA	9–4	**Watson, Matthew (6-3)**	Rodriguez, Arturo (1-3)	**Thomas, Hayden (2)**	ESPN+	501	23–25	11–8
May 13	at Nicholls		Ben Meyer Diamond at Ray E. Didier Field • Thibodaux, LA	2–7	Mayers, Jacob (8-1)	**Purcell, Colin (4-6)**	Saltaformaggio, Nico (3)	ESPN+	531	23–26	11–9
May 14	at Nicholls		Ben Meyer Diamond at Ray E. Didier Field • Thibodaux, LA	6–9	Gearing, Chase (2-1)	**Garcia, Zach (2-4)**	Evans, Cade (6)	ESPN+	545	23–27	11–10
May 18	Incarnate Word		Chapman Field • Corpus Christi, TX	6–9	Cassidy, Kayden (3-2)	**Watson, Matthew (6-4)**	Hayward, Steve (6)()	ESPN+	334	23–28	11–11
May 19	Incarnate Word		Chapman Field • Corpus Christi, TX	7–3	**Purcell, Colin (5-6)**	Schlotzhauer, R (2-2)		ESPN+	405	24–28	12–11
May 20	Incarnate Word		Chapman Field • Corpus Christi, TX	1–5	Rollins, Carson (3-1)	**Garcia, Zach (2-5)**	Hayward, Steve (7)	ESPN+	345	24–29	12–12

Postseason (0–1)

Southland Tournament (0–1)
Date	Opponent	(Seed)/Rank	Site/stadium	Score	Win	Loss	Save	TV	Attendance	Overall record	Tournament record
May 23	vs. (6) McNeese	(7)	Joe Miller Ballpark • Lake Charles, LA	0–4	Rogers, Grant (12-1)	**Watson, Matthew (6-5)**		ESPN+	884	24–30	0–1

Schedule source:

*Rankings are based on the team's current ranking in the D1Baseball poll.
