= 2023 Incarnate Word Cardinals baseball team =

American college baseball season

2023 Incarnate Word Cardinals baseball
- Conference: Southland Conference
- Record: 28–26 (14–10 Southland)
- Head coach: Ryan Shotzberger (4th season)
- Assistant coaches: Greg Evans; Quintin Crandall
- Home stadium: Sullivan Field

2023 Southland Conference baseball standings
| | Conf. | | | | Overall |
| Team | W | | L | PCT | W | | L | PCT |
|---|---|---|---|---|---|---|---|---|
| Nicholls ‍†‍‡‍^{y} | 15 | – | 9 | .625 | 34 | – | 24 | .586 |
| Incarnate Word ‍‍‍ | 14 | – | 10 | .583 | 28 | – | 26 | .519 |
| New Orleans ‍‍‍ | 13 | – | 11 | .542 | 36 | – | 24 | .600 |
| Lamar ‍‍‍ | 13 | – | 11 | .542 | 32 | – | 23 | .582 |
| McNeese ‍‍‍ | 12 | – | 12 | .500 | 35 | – | 23 | .603 |
| Northwestern State ‍‍‍ | 12 | – | 12 | .500 | 29 | – | 27 | .518 |
| Texas A&M–Corpus Christi ‍‍‍ | 12 | – | 12 | .500 | 24 | – | 30 | .444 |
| Southeastern Louisiana ‍‍‍ | 9 | – | 14 | .391 | 25 | – | 25 | .500 |
| Houston Christian ‍‍‍ | 7 | – | 16 | .304 | 11 | – | 37 | .229 |
† – Conference champion ‡ – Tournament champion y – Invited to the NCAA Tournament; As of June 3, 2023; Rankings from D1Baseball

The 2023 Incarnate Word Cardinals baseball team represented the University of the Incarnate Word during the 2023 NCAA Division I baseball season. The Cardinals played their home games at Sullivan Field and were led by fourth–year head coach Ryan Shotzberger. They are members of the Southland Conference.

The Cardinals had a regular season record of 28–26 and a conference record of 14–10 finishing in second place in SLC play. They participated in the 2023 Southland Conference baseball tournament as the second seeded team. The Cardinals were 0–2 in the conference tournament losing to fifth seeded Northwestern State 1–2 and sixth seeded McNeese 0–3.

== Preseason ==
=== Southland Conference Coaches Poll ===
The Southland Conference Coaches Poll was released on February 3, 2023. Incarnate Word was picked to finish ninth in the Southland Conference with 20 votes.

Coaches poll
| Predicted finish | Team | Votes (1st place) |
| 1 | McNeese | 118 (7) |
| 2 | Southeastern Louisiana | 115 (10) |
| 3 | Lamar | 88 |
| 4 | New Orleans | 87 |
| 5 | Northwestern State | 65 (1) |
| 6 | Nicholls | 59 |
| 7 | Texas A&M–Corpus Christi | 55 |
| 8 | Houston Christian | 41 |
| 9 | Incarnate Word | 20 |

=== Preseason All-Southland team ===
One Incarnate Word player was named to the conference preseason first team.

==== First Team ====
- Alec Carr (UIW, SR, Utility)

== Personnel ==
=== Roster ===
2023 Incarnate Word Cardinals Roster
| Pitchers: 6 – Isaiah Zavala – RHP – senior (5'11, 145); 11 – Larry Westall – RHP – junior (6'4, 185); 12 – Kayden Cassidy – LHP – (redshirt) senior (6'0, 180); 15 – Steve Hayward – RHP – (redshirt) senior (6'5, 188); 16 – Seth Higdon – RHP – senior (6'2, 205); 17 – Westin Walls – RHP – junior (6'5, 215); 18 – Luis Rodriguez – RHP – junior (6'0, 215); 19 – Garrett Coiner – RHP – freshman (5'10, 165); 20 – EJ Garcia – RHP – freshman (5'9, 170); 23 – Braden Berry – RHP – junior (6'2, 230); 27 – Dave Johnson – RHP – junior (6'4, 180); 28 – Otto Stacey – RHP – senior (6'2, 195); 31 – Danny Davis – RHP – junior (6'6, 215); 34 – Carson Rollins – LHP – junior (6'2, 200); 37 – Sawyer Hansen – LHP – junior (6'1, 180); 38 – Ryan Schlotzhauer – LHP – junior (6'3, 190); 41 – Hunter Murray – RHP – (redshirt) senior (6'0, 200); 43 – Micah Berens – RHP – junior (6'4, 235) | Catchers: 8 – Jared Rhodes – R/R – junior (6'0, 185); 24 – Hernan Yanez – R/R – senior (6'0, 200); 30 – Tommy McCormick – R/R – junior (6'0, 215); Infielders: 0 – Jacob Ruiz – R/R – (redshirt) freshman (6'0, 195); 2 – Grant Randall – R/R – junior (5'10, 165); 3 – Tyler Preece – R/R – junior (6'0, 195); 5 – Alec Carr – R/R – senior (6'0, 210); 13 – Cameron Crotte – R/R – junior (6'4, 195); 21 – Tony DeJesus – R/R – freshman (6'0, 190); 22 – Til Nalle – R/R – (redshirt) freshman (6'1, 195); 25 – Joe Jimenez – R/R – (redshirt) senior (6'3, 190); 26 – Matt Crump – R/R – junior (6'1, 200); 32 – Jimmy De Leon – R/R – senior (5'8, 180) | Outfielders: 1 – Daniel Calabrese – R/R – sophomore (5'11, 170); 4 – Sterling Sutcliffe – L/L – junior (6'2, 185); 7 – Warren Laster – L/L – senior (5'10, 170); 9 – Jamey Richey – R/R – senior (6'5, 205); 29 – Sam Tormos – R/R – junior (6'3, 205); 33 – Rey Mendoza – L/L – (redshirt) senior (6'5, 210); 35 – Wilson Ehrhardt – L/L – (redshirt) senior (6'1, 215); 36 – Jacob Caraway – L/L – freshman (6'3, 190); 46 – Matthew Flores-King – R/R – freshman (6'0, 175) |

=== Coaching staff ===
| Name | Position | Seasons at Incarnate Word | Alma mater |
|---|---|---|---|
| Ryan Shotzberger | Head coach | 4 | McDaniel College (2004) |
| Greg Evans | Assistant Coach | 4 | Ole Miss (1985) |
| Quintin Crandall | Assistant Coach | 2 | Kansas State (2017) |
| Andrew Stumph | Volunteer Assistant Coach | 1 | Texas State (2013) |
| Chance Medina | Director of Player Development | 2 | Incarnate Word (2021) |

== Schedule and results ==
Legend
| | Incarnate Word win |
| | Incarnate Word loss |
| | Postponement/Cancelation/Suspensions |
| **Bold** | Incarnate Word team member |
| * | Non-Conference game |

2023 Incarnate Word Cardinals baseball game log
Regular season (28–26)

February (3–5)
| Date | Opponent | Rank | Site/stadium Site | Score | Win | Loss | Save | TV | Attendance | Overall record | SLC Record |
|---|---|---|---|---|---|---|---|---|---|---|---|
| February 17 | SIU Edwardsville* | | Sullivan Field; San Antonio, TX | **L** 0–2 | J. Bockenstedt (1-0) | **K. Cassidy (0-1)** | Z. Ponder (1) | ESPN+ | 95 | 0–1 | |
| February 18 | SIU Edwardsville* | | Sullivan Field; San Antonio, TX | **W** 5–1 | **I. Zavala (1-0)** | H. Cooper (0-1) | None | ESPN+ | 149 | 1–1 | |
| February 19 | SIU Edwardsville* | | Sullivan Field; San Antonio, TX | **L** 5–9 | T. Conrad (1-0) | **C. Rollins (0-1)** | J. Kampf (1) | ESPN+ | 165 | 1–2 | |
| February 21 | Tarleton* | | Sullivan Field; San Antonio, TX | **L** 3–5 | G. Garza (1-0) | **E. Garcia (0-1)** | Z. Poe (1) | ESPN+ | 128 | 1–3 | |
Klegberg Bank College Classic
| February 24 | Texas A&M–Corpus Christi* | | Whataburger Field; Corpus Christi, TX | **W** 10–4 | **K. Cassidy (1-1)** | H. Thomas (1-1) | None | | 883 | 2–3 | |
| February 25 | Utah* | | Whataburger Field; Corpus Christi, TX | **L** 6–13 | M. Ashman (1-0) | **S. Higdon (0-1)** | None | | 173 | 2–4 | |
| February 26 | Houston* | | Whataburger Field; Corpus Christi, TX | **W** 10–8 | **S. Hayward (1-0)** | J. Torrealba (1-2) | None | | 233 | 3–4 | |
| February 28 | Texas State* | | Sullivan Field; San Antonio, TX | **L** 8–12 | O. Wofford (1-0) | **E. Garcia (0-2)** | None | ESPN+ | 220 | 3–5 | |

March (10–8)
| Date | Opponent | Rank | Site/stadium | Score | Win | Loss | Save | TV | Attendance | Overall record | SLC Record |
|---|---|---|---|---|---|---|---|---|---|---|---|
| March 1 | at UTSA* | | Roadrunner Field; San Antonio, TX | **L** 1–2 | S. Miller (3-0) | **L. Rodriguez (0-1)** | None | None | 391 | 3–6 | |
| March 3 | Louisiana–Monroe* | | Sullivan Field; San Antonio, TX | **W** 5–4^{13} | **S. Hayward (2-0)** | C. Orton (1-1) | None | ESPN+ | 75 | 4–6 | |
| March 4 | Louisiana–Monroe* | | Sullivan Field; San Antonio, TX | **W** 14–4^{8} | **I. Zavala (2-0)** | C. Cressend (1-2) | **E. Garcia (1)** | ESPN+ | 178 | 5–6 | |
| March 5 | Louisiana–Monroe* | | Sullivan Field; San Antonio, TX | **W** 12–4 | **R. Schlotzhauer (1-0)** | C. Menard (1-1) | None | ESPN+ | 90 | 6–6 | |
| March 7 | at Texas A&M* | | Olsen Field at Blue Bell Park; College Station, TX | **L** 5–13 | B. Rudis (2-0) | **S. Higdon (0-2)** | None | | 4,653 | 6–7 | |
| March 10 | Southern* | | Sullivan Field; San Antonio, TX | **W** 6–5 | **O. Stacey (1-0)** | E. Ozoa (0-1) | None | ESPN+ | 84 | 7–7 | |
| March 11 | Southern* | | Sullivan Field; San Antonio, TX | **W** 11–4 | **I. Zavala (3-0)** | N. Wilson (0-2) | None | ESPN+ | 112 | 8–7 | |
| March 12 | Southern* | | Sullivan Field; San Antonio, TX | **W** 12–2^{7} | **M. Berens (1-0)** | C. Davis (0-2) | None | ESPN+ | 83 | 9–7 | |
| March 14 | at Prairie View A&M* | | John W. Tankersley Field; Prairie View, TX | **W** 5–4 | **L. Westall (1-0)** | G. Busch (0-2) | S. Hayward (1) | | 132 | 10–7 | |
| March 17 | at Tarleton * | | Cecil Ballow Baseball Complex; Stephenville, TX | **L** 6–10 | J. Burcham (2-1) | **L. Rodriguez (0-2)** | None | ESPN+ | 348 | 10–8 | |
| March 18 | at Tarleton * | | Cecil Ballow Baseball Complex; Stephenville, TX | **L** 4–5 | R. Elston (2-0) | **S. Hayward (2-1)** | None | ESPN+ | 402 | 10–9 | |
| March 19 | at Tarleton * | | Cecil Ballow Baseball Complex; Stephenville, TX | **L** 7–8 | R. Jacobs (1-0) | **D. Johnson (0-1)** | None | ESPN+ | 438 | 10–10 | |
| March 21 | at Texas* | | UFCU Disch–Falk Field; Austin, TX | **L** 11–17 | C. Hurley (2-0) | **S. Higdon (0-3)** | None | | 6,182 | 10–11 | |
| March 24 | Houston Christian | | Sullivan Field; San Antonio, TX | **W** 7–3^{11} | **S. Hayward (3-1)** | J. Smitherman (0-1) | None | ESPN+ | 230 | 11–11 | 1–0 |
| March 25 | Houston Christian | | Sullivan Field; San Antonio, TX | **W** 7–6 | **R. Schlotzhauer (2-0)** | D. Farrow (0-1) | **E. Garcia (2)** | ESPN+ | 110 | 12–11 | 2–0 |
| March 26 | Houston Christian | | Sullivan Field; San Antonio, TX | **L** 6–7 | C. Ricker (3-2) | **S. Hayward (3-2)** | J. Smitherman (1) | ESPN+ | 157 | 12–12 | 2–1 |
| March 28 | Prairie View A&M* | | Sullivan Field; San Antonio, TX | **W** 6–2 | **C. Rollins (1–1)** | K. Carrick (0–2) | **W. Walls (1)** | ESPN+ | 83 | 13–12 | 2–1 |
| March 31 | at Southeastern Louisiana | | Pat Kenelly Diamond at Alumni Field; Hammond, LA | **L** 2–10 | B. Stuprich (3–2) | **K. Cassidy (1–2)** | None | ESPN+ | 1,254 | 13–13 | 2–2 |

April (9–7)
| Date | Opponent | Rank | Site/stadium | Score | Win | Loss | Save | TV | Attendance | Overall record | SLC Record |
|---|---|---|---|---|---|---|---|---|---|---|---|
| April 1 | at Southeastern Louisiana | | Pat Kenelly Diamond at Alumni Field; Hammond, LA | **W** 5–2 | **I. Zavala (4–0)** | W. Kinzeler (4–1) | **S. Hayward (2)** | ESPN+ | 1,275 | 14–13 | 3–2 |
| April 2 | at Southeastern Louisiana | | Pat Kenelly Diamond at Alumni Field; Hammond, LA | **W** 11–1 | **M. Berens (2–0)** | A. Landry (2-4) | **L. Rodriguez (1)** | ESPN+ | 1,258 | 15–13 | 4–2 |
| April 4 | UTSA* | | Sullivan Field; San Antonio, TX | **W** 9–6 | **S. Hayward (4-2)** | D. Shafer (0-1) | None | ESPN+ | 276 | 16–13 | 4–2 |
| April 6 (1)^{[a]} | at Nicholls | | Ben Meyer Diamond at Ray E. Didier Field; Thibodaux, LA | **W** 9–8 | **L. Rodriguez (1–2)** | C. Evans (0–1) | **S. Hayward (3)** | | 165 | 17–13 | 5–2 |
| April 6 (2) | at Nicholls | | Ben Meyer Diamond at Ray E. Didier Field; Thibodaux, LA | **L** 1–8 | M. Quevedo (2–0) | **S. Higdon (0–4)** | None | | 107 | 17–14 | 5–3 |
| April 8 | at Nicholls | | Ben Meyer Diamond at Ray E. Didier Field; Thibodaux, LA | **W** 8–3 | **I. Zavala (5-0)** | N. Saltaformaggio (2-1) | **M. Berens (1)** | | 534 | 18–14 | 6–3 |
| April 14 | Lamar | | Sullivan Field; San Antonio, TX | **W** 9–7 | **O. Stacey (2-0)** | J. Cleveland (3-3) | None | ESPN+ | 191 | 19–14 | 7–3 |
| April 15 | Lamar | | Sullivan Field; San Antonio, TX | **W** 5–1 | **I. Zavala (6-0)** | J. Ellis (2-2) | **S. Hayward (4)** | ESPN+ | 230 | 20–14 | 8–3 |
| April 16 | Lamar | | Sullivan Field; San Antonio, TX | **L** 1–6 | H. Hesseltine (2-1) | M. Berens (2-1) | None | ESPN+ | 202 | 20–15 | 8–4 |
| April 18 | UTRGV* | | Sullivan Field; San Antonio, TX | **L** 12–15 | Z. Tjelmeland (2-1) | **S. Hayward (4-3)** | N. Rodriguez (2) | ESPN+ | 109 | 20–16 | |
| April 19 | at Grambling* | | Wilbert Ellis Field at Ralph Waldo Emerson Jones Park; Grambling, LA | 19–3 (7 inn) | **Higdon, Seth (1-4)** | Jacorey Boudreaux (1-4) | None | | 75 | 21–15 | |
| April 21 | at Northwestern State | | H. Alvin Brown–C. C. Stroud Field; Natchitoches, LA | 11–5 (10 inn) | **Hayward, Steve (5-3)** | Prestwich, Chase (4-2) | None | | 673 | 22–15 | 9–4 |
| April 22 | at Northwestern State | | H. Alvin Brown–C. C. Stroud Field; Natchitoches, LA | 4–10 | Makarewich, Alex (4-3) | **Zavala, Isaiah (6-1)** | None | | 915 | 22–16 | 9–5 |
| April 23 | at Northwestern State | | H. Alvin Brown–C. C. Stroud Field; Natchitoches, LA | 0–10 (8 inn) | Brown, Drayton (3-5) | **Berens, Micah (2-2)** | None | | 769 | 22–17 | 9–6 |
| April 25 | UTRGV* | | UTRGV Baseball Stadium; Edinburg, TX | 8–9 | Loya, Bobby (1-0) | **Higdon, Seth (1-5)** | Rodriguez, Nico (3) | | 2,262 | 22–18 | |
| April 28 | McNeese | | Sullivan Field; San Antonio, TX | 8–7 | **Hayward, Steve (6-3)** | Abraham, Ty (1-1) | None | ESPN+ | 84 | 23–18 | 10–6 |
| April 29 | McNeese | | Sullivan Field; San Antonio, TX | 8–6 | **Cassidy, Kayden (2-2)** | Jones, Burrell (3-2) | **Hayward, Steve (5)** | ESPN+ | 147 | 24–19 | 11–6 |
| April 30 | McNeese | | Sullivan Field; San Antonio, TX | 2–9 | Barthelemy, Brock (2-0) | **Berens, Micah (2-3)** | None | ESPN+ | 110 | 24–20 | 11–7 |
^{^[a]}Rescheduled from April 8 as a single-admission doubleheader due to the threat of inclement weather.

May (4–4)
| Date | Opponent | Rank | Site/stadium | Score | Win | Loss | Save | TV | Attendance | Overall record | SLC Record |
|---|---|---|---|---|---|---|---|---|---|---|---|
| May 2 | at Texas State* | | Bobcat Baseball Stadium; San Marcos, TX | 5–10 | Medrano, Nathan (2-2) | **Garcia, EJ (0-3)** | None | | 1,434 | 24–21 | |
| May 9 | at Rice* | | Reckling Park; Houston, TX | 10–1 | **Rollins, Carson (2-1)** | Ryland Urbanczyk (0-1) | None | | 1,738 | 25–21 | |
| May 12 | New Orleans | | Sullivan Field; San Antonio, TX | 1–12^{(7)} | Mitchell, Brandon (9-3 | **Schlotzhauer, Ryan (2-1)** | () | ESPN+ | 86 | 25–22 | 11–8 |
| May 12 | New Orleans | | Sullivan Field; San Antonio, TX | 11–10 | **Hayward, Steve (7-3)** | Blanchard, Beau (0-4) | None | ESPN+ | 112 | 26–22 | 12–8 |
| May 14 | New Orleans | | Sullivan Field; San Antonio, TX | 5–15 | LeBlanc, Tyler (3-3) | **Berens, Micah (2-4)** | None | ESPN+ | 114 | 26–23 | 12–9 |
| May 18 | Texas A&M–Corpus Christi | | Chapman Field; Corpus Christi, TX | 9–6 | **Cassidy, Kayden (3-2)** | Watson, Matthew (6-4) | **Hayward, Steve (6)** | ESPN+ | 334 | 27–23 | 13–9 |
| May 19 | Texas A&M–Corpus Christi | | Chapman Field; Corpus Christi, TX | 3–7 | Purcell, Colin (5-6) | **Schlotzhauer, Ryan (2-2)** | None | ESPN+ | 405 | 27–24 | 13–10 |
| May 20 | Texas A&M–Corpus Christi | | Chapman Field; Corpus Christi, TX | 5–1 | **Rollins, Carson (3-1)** | Garcia, Zach (2-5) | **Hayward, Steve (7)** | ESPN+ | 345 | 28–24 | 14–10 |

Postseason (0–2)

Southland Tournament (0–2)
| Date | Opponent | (Seed)/Rank | Site/stadium | Score | Win | Loss | Save | TV | Attendance | Overall record | Tournament record |
|---|---|---|---|---|---|---|---|---|---|---|---|
| May 24 | vs. (5) Northwestern State | (2) | Joe Miller Ballpark; Lake Charles, LA | 1–2 | Carver, Cal (7-3) | **Cassidy, Kayden (3-3**) | Prestwich, Chase (2) | ESPN+ | | 28–25 | 0–1 |
| May 25 | vs. (6) McNeese | (2) | Joe Miller Ballpark; Lake Charles, LA | 0–3 | Hudgens, Bryson (1-0) | **Berens, Micah (2-5)** | Barthelemy, Brock (3) | ESPN+ | | 28–26 | 0–2 |

Schedule source:

*Rankings are based on the team's current ranking in the D1Baseball poll.
