= 2023 New Orleans Privateers baseball team =

American college baseball season

2023 New Orleans Privateers baseball
- Conference: Southland Conference
- Record: 36–24 (13–11 Southland)
- Head coach: Blake Dean (8th season)
- Assistant coaches: Brett Stewart; Dax Norris; Phillip Hurst
- Home stadium: Maestri Field at Privateer Park

2023 Southland Conference baseball standings
	Conf.				Overall
Team	W		L	PCT	W		L	PCT
Nicholls ‍†‍‡‍^{y}	15	–	9	.625	34	–	24	.586
Incarnate Word ‍‍‍	14	–	10	.583	28	–	26	.519
New Orleans ‍‍‍	13	–	11	.542	36	–	24	.600
Lamar ‍‍‍	13	–	11	.542	32	–	23	.582
McNeese ‍‍‍	12	–	12	.500	35	–	23	.603
Northwestern State ‍‍‍	12	–	12	.500	29	–	27	.518
Texas A&M–Corpus Christi ‍‍‍	12	–	12	.500	24	–	30	.444
Southeastern Louisiana ‍‍‍	9	–	14	.391	25	–	25	.500
Houston Christian ‍‍‍	7	–	16	.304	11	–	37	.229
† – Conference champion ‡ – Tournament champion y – Invited to the NCAA Tournament; As of June 3, 2023; Rankings from D1Baseball

The 2023 New Orleans Privateers baseball team represented the University of New Orleans during the 2023 NCAA Division I baseball season. The Privateers played their home games at Maestri Field at Privateer Park and were led by eighth–year head coach Blake Dean. They were members of the Southland Conference.

== Preseason ==
=== Southland Conference Coaches Poll ===
The Southland Conference Coaches Poll was released on February 3, 2023. New Orleans was picked to finish fourth in the Southland Conference with 87 votes.

Coaches poll
Predicted finish	Team	Votes (1st place)
1	McNeese State	118 (7)
2	Southeastern Louisiana	115 (10)
3	Lamar	88
4	New Orleans	87
5	Northwestern State	65 (1)
6	Nicholls	59
7	Texas A&M–Corpus Christi	55
8	Houston Christian	41
9	Incarnate Word	20

=== Preseason All-Southland team ===
Four New Orleans players were named to the conference preseason second team.

==== First Team ====
- Edgar Alvarez (NICH, JR, 1st Base)
- Brad Burckel (MCNS, SR, 2nd Base)
- Josh Leslie (MCNS, SR, 3rd Base)
- Parker Coddou (NICH, JR, Shortstop)
- Bo Willis (NWST, JR, Catcher)
- Tre Jones (TAMUCC, JR, Designated Hitter)
- Payton Harden (MCNS, SR, Outfielder)
- Brendan Ryan (TAMUCC, SR, Outfielder)
- Xane Washington (NICH, R-SR, Outfielder)
- Zach Garcia (TAMUCC, SO, Starting Pitcher)
- Grant Rogers (MCNS, JR, Starting Pitcher)
- Tyler Theriot (NICH, SR, Starting Pitcher)
- Burrell Jones (MCNS, SR, Relief Pitcher)
- Alec Carr (UIW, SR, Utility)

==== Second Team ====
- Josh Blankenship (LU, SR, 1st Base)
- Daunte Stuart (NWST, JR, 2nd Base)
- Kasten Furr (NO, JR, 3rd Base)
- Tyler Bischke (NO, JR, Shortstop)
- Bryce Grizzaffi (SELA, SR, Catcher)
- Kade Hunter (MCNS, SR, Designated Hitter)
- Josh Caraway (TAMUCC, JR, Outfielder)
- Braden Duhon (MCNS, JR, Outfielder)
- Issac Williams (NO, JR, Outfielder)
- Cal Carver (NWST, SR, Starting Pitcher)
- Tyler LeBlanc (NO, JR, Starting Pitcher)
- Will Kinzeler (SELA, JR, Starting Pitcher)
- Dalton Aspholm (SELA, SR, Relief Pitcher)
- Tre’ Obregon III (MCNS, SR, Utility)

== Personnel ==
2023 New Orleans Privateers baseball team
Players
Coaches

#	Pos.	Name	B/T	Height	Weight	Year	Home town
1	INF	Tyler Bischke	R/R	5 ft 10 in (1.78 m)	185 lb (84 kg)	Jr	Pittsburgh, Pennsylvania
2	RHP	Caleb Seroski	R/R	6 ft 0 in (1.83 m)	165 lb (75 kg)	Jr	New Iberia, Louisiana
3	C	Myles Austin	R/R	6 ft 3 in (1.91 m)	185 lb (84 kg)	Jr	Atlanta, Georgia
4	OF	Mitchell Sanford (redshirt)	L/R	6 ft 2 in (1.88 m)	205 lb (93 kg)	So	Berwick, Louisiana
5	INF	Noah Bailey	L/R	6 ft 0 in (1.83 m)	185 lb (84 kg)	Gr	Niceville, Florida
6	OF	Max Dias (redshirt)	R/R	6 ft 0 in (1.83 m)	205 lb (93 kg)	Jr	Porter, Texas
7	INF	Jeissy De la Cruz	S/R	5 ft 10 in (1.78 m)	180 lb (82 kg)	Sr	New York City, New York
8	LHP	Tyler LeBlanc	L/L	6 ft 4 in (1.93 m)	195 lb (88 kg)	Jr	Lafayette, Louisiana
10	OF	Issac Williams	R/R	5 ft 11 in (1.8 m)	195 lb (88 kg)	Jr	Alexandria, Louisiana
11	RHP	Tod Gauthe	R/R	5 ft 10 in (1.78 m)	190 lb (86 kg)	Gr	Brusly, Louisiana
12	RHP	Jack Williams (redshirt)	R/R	6 ft 1 in (1.85 m)	175 lb (79 kg)	Jr	Cypress, Texas
13	C	Miguel Useche	R/R	6 ft 0 in (1.83 m)	200 lb (91 kg)	Jr	Caracas, Venezuela
15	OF	Tristan Moore	R/R	6 ft 2 in (1.88 m)	185 lb (84 kg)	Jr	St. Thomas, U.S. Virgin Islands
16	RHP	Connor Macip	R/R	6 ft 5 in (1.96 m)	221 lb (100 kg)	Jr	Scott, Louisiana
17	RHP	Trey Usey (redshirt)	R/R	6 ft 1 in (1.85 m)	187 lb (85 kg)	Fr	Lafitte, Louisiana
18	INF	Kasten Furr	R/R	5 ft 10 in (1.78 m)	180 lb (82 kg)	Jr	Ruston, Louisiana
19		Anthony Herron Jr.	R/R	6 ft 2 in (1.88 m)	235 lb (107 kg)	Sr	Chicago, Illinois
20	C	Nathan Blasick	L/R	6 ft 3 in (1.91 m)	210 lb (95 kg)	Jr	Halifax, Pennsylvania
22	RHP	Matthew Maldonado (redshirt)	L/R	6 ft 2 in (1.88 m)	215 lb (98 kg)	Sr	Geronimo, Texas
23	RHP	Connor Handy (redshirt)	R/R	6 ft 6 in (1.98 m)	225 lb (102 kg)	Fr	Richmond, Virginia
24	RHP	Jacob Mead (redshirt)	R/R	6 ft 3 in (1.91 m)	220 lb (100 kg)	Sr	Round Rock, Texas
25	RHP	Beau Blanchard	R/R	6 ft 5 in (1.96 m)	220 lb (100 kg)	Jr	New Iberia, Louisiana
26	C	Andrew Guidry (redshirt)	L/R	6 ft 1 in (1.85 m)	206 lb (93 kg)	So	Lafayette, Louisiana
27	LHP	Ryan Delorbe	L/L	5 ft 10 in (1.78 m)	180 lb (82 kg)	Jr	Bronx, New York
28	LHP	Colton Mercer	L/L	6 ft 3 in (1.91 m)	190 lb (86 kg)	So	Sneads, Florida
29	INF	Collin Loupe (redshirt)	R/R	5 ft 9 in (1.75 m)	175 lb (79 kg)	Fr	Slidell, Louisiana
30		Andrew Duran	R/R	6 ft 3 in (1.91 m)	225 lb (102 kg)	So	Covina, California
31	RHP	Davis Benton	R/R	6 ft 2 in (1.88 m)	195 lb (88 kg)	So	Fort Worth, Texas
32	RHP	Jose Cabrera (redshirt)	R/R	6 ft 0 in (1.83 m)	230 lb (104 kg)	Jr	Santiago, Dominican Republic
33	LHP	Brandon Mitchell	L/L	6 ft 2 in (1.88 m)	215 lb (98 kg)	Sr	Houston, Texas
34	C	Jorge Tejeda	R/R	5 ft 10 in (1.78 m)	190 lb (86 kg)	Sr	Villa Clara, Cuba
35	INF	Zeph Hoffpauir	R/R	6 ft 2 in (1.88 m)	205 lb (93 kg)	Jr	Berwick, Louisiana
38	OF	Carson Garza	R/R	6 ft 3 in (1.91 m)	190 lb (86 kg)	So	Leander, Texas
39		Collin Horton	R/R	6 ft 0 in (1.83 m)	210 lb (95 kg)	Jr	Keller, Texas
40	INF	Dylan Mach	R/R	6 ft 3 in (1.91 m)	190 lb (86 kg)	Jr	Aledo, Texas
43	RHP	Nolan Daniel	R/R	6 ft 3 in (1.91 m)	240 lb (109 kg)	Sr	Dublin, Georgia
44	LHP	Keegan Rich	L/L	6 ft 5 in (1.96 m)	230 lb (104 kg)	Jr	Newnan, Georgia
46	LHP	Caleb Menina	L/L	6 ft 1 in (1.85 m)	225 lb (102 kg)	So	Morgan City, Louisiana
51	RHP	Canaan Clayton	R/R	6 ft 5 in (1.96 m)	225 lb (102 kg)	Fr	New Orleans, Louisiana
52	INF	Maika Niu	R/R	6 ft 1 in (1.85 m)	180 lb (82 kg)	Fr	Mechanicsburg, Pennsylvania
	C	Tyler McKenna (redshirt)	L/R	6 ft 3 in (1.91 m)	215 lb (98 kg)	Jr	Valrico, Florida
	RHP	Jace Phelan	R/R	6 ft 2 in (1.88 m)	175 lb (79 kg)	So	Chicago, Illinois

Head coach

Blake Dean (Louisiana State)

Assistant coach(es)

Brett Stewart (Appalachian State)
Dax Norris (Alabama)
Philip Hurst

Legend

- (C) Team captain
- (S) Suspended
- (I) Ineligible
- Injured
- Current redshirt

Roster
Last update: 2023 March 13

== Schedule and results ==
Legend
	New Orleans win
	New Orleans loss
	Postponement/Cancelation/Suspensions
**Bold**	New Orleans team member
*	Non-Conference game
†	Make-Up Game

2023 New Orleans Privateers baseball game log
Regular season (33–22)

February (3–4)
Date	Opponent	Rank	Site/stadium	Score	Win	Loss	Save	TV	Attendance	Overall record	SLC Record
Feb. 17	at Kennesaw State*		Fred Stillwell Stadium • Kennesaw, GA	9–6	**C. Mercer** (1–0)	N. Zegna (0–1)	**B. Blanchard** (1)		449	1–0	
Feb. 18	at Kennesaw State*		Fred Stillwell Stadium • Kennesaw, GA	1–10	B. Aita (1–0)	**B. Mitchell** (0–1)	None		498	1–1	
Feb. 19	at Kennesaw State*		Fred Stillwell Stadium • Kennesaw, GA	4–8	S. Pinson (1–0)	**C. Horton** (0–1)	N. Sliver (1)		511	1–2	
Feb. 21	No. 18 Southern Miss*		Pete Taylor Park • Hattiesburg, MS	0–12	B. Oldham (1–0)	**J. Cabrera** (0–1)	None		5,273	1–3	
Andre Dawson Classic
Feb. 24	Jackson State*		Maestri Field at Privateer Park • New Orleans, LA	0–3	J. Caver (1–1)	**T. LeBlanc** (0–1)	J. Posey (1)	ESPN+	420	1–4	
Feb. 25	Florida A&M*		Maestri Field at Privateer Park • New Orleans, LA	12–0^{(7)}	**B. Mitchell** (1–1)	G. Harrison (0–2)	None		513	2–4	
Feb. 26	Alabama State*		Maestri Field at Privateer Park • New Orleans, LA	18–7^{(7)}	**C. Mercer** (2–0)	A. Lapread (0–1)	None		568	3–4	

March (11–8)
Date	Opponent	Rank	Site/stadium	Score	Win	Loss	Save	TV	Attendance	Overall record	SLC Record
Mar. 1	at Tulane*		Greer Field at Turchin Stadium • New Orleans, LA	6–5	**N. Daniel** (1–0)	T. Banks (0–1)	**M. Maldonado** (1)		1,684	4–4	
Mar. 3	Brown*		Maestri Field at Privateer Park • New Orleans, LA	10–3	**T. LeBlanc** (1–1)	T. McDonough (0–2)	None	ESPN+	389	5–4	
Mar. 4	Brown*		Maestri Field at Privateer Park • New Orleans, LA	9–5	**B. Mitchell** (2–1)	S. Gottam (0–2)	**B. Blanchard** (2)	ESPN+	357	6–4	
Mar. 5	Brown*		Maestri Field at Privateer Park • New Orleans, LA	5–1	**C. Horton** (1–1)	D. Reid (0–1)	**T. Usey** (1)	ESPN+	411	7–4	
Mar. 7	at South Alabama*		Eddie Stanky Field • Mobile, AL	7–10	G. Wood (2–0)	**B. Blanchard** (0–1)	None	ESPN+	926	7–5	
Mar. 8	Southern University*		Maestri Field at Privateer Park • New Orleans, LA	10–9	**J. Mead** (1–0)	D. Lasseigne (0–2)	**M. Maldonado** (2)	ESPN+	423	8–5	
Mar. 10	Mississippi Valley State*		Maestri Field at Privateer Park • New Orleans, LA	7–3	**T. LeBlanc** (2–1)	Z. Sigmon (11)	**T. Usey** (2)	ESPN+	322	9–5	
Mar. 11	Mississippi Valley State*		Maestri Field at Privateer Park • New Orleans, LA	35–3^{(7)}	**B. Mitchell** (3–1)	I. Valenzuela (1–2)	**C. Macip** (1)	ESPN+	388	10–5	
Mar. 12	Mississippi Valley State*		Maestri Field at Privateer Park • New Orleans, LA	16–3^{(7)}	**C. Horton** (2–1)	A. Lewis (0–4)	None	ESPN+	396	11–5	
Mar. 14	at No. 1 LSU*		Alex Box Stadium, Skip Bertman Field • Baton Rouge, LA	0–16	G. Edwards (2–0)	**C. Mercer** (2–1)	None	SECN+	10,257	11–6	
Mar. 17	at Texas*		UFCU Disch–Falk Field • Austin, TX	1–3	L. Gordon (2–0)	**T. LeBlanc** (2–2)	Z. Morehouse (2)	LHN	6,290	11–7	
Mar. 18	at Texas*		UFCU Disch–Falk Field • Austin, TX	1–15	T. Sthele (2–2)	**B. Mitchell** (3–2)	None	LHN	6,520	11–8	
Mar. 19	at Texas*		UFCU Disch–Falk Field • Austin, TX	3–9	D. Shaw (1–1)	**C. Horton** (2–2)	None	LHN	6,347	11–9	
Mar. 21	Southern Miss*		Maestri Field at Privateer Park • New Orleans, LA	6–3	**C. Menina** (1–0)	B. Oldham (2–1)	None	ESPN+	1,249	12–9	
Mar. 24	at Lamar		Vincent–Beck Stadium • Beaumont, TX	2–4	F. Kreuzer (3–0)	**B. Blanchard** (0–2)	J. Cleveland (4)	ESPN+	1,684	12–10	0–1
Mar. 25	at Lamar		Vincent–Beck Stadium • Beaumont, TX	5–2	**B. Mitchell** (4–2)	T. Morse (1–1)	None	ESPN+	233	13–10	1–1
Mar. 26	at Lamar		Vincent–Beck Stadium • Beaumont, TX	4–9	B. Caple (2–0)	**C. Horton** (2–3)	J. Cleveland (5)	ESPN+	1,198	13–11	1–2
Mar. 29	at Tulane*		Greer Field at Turchin Stadium • New Orleans, LA	16–4	**T. Gauthe** (1–0)	C. Sanchez (0–5)	None		2,009	14–11	
Mar. 31	Northwestern State		Maestri Field at Privateer Park • New Orleans, LA	8–11	C. Carver (4–2)	**T. LeBlanc** (2–3)	K. Froehlich (4)	ESPN+	288	14–12	1–3

April (11–7)
Date	Opponent	Rank	Site/stadium	Score	Win	Loss	Save	TV	Attendance	Overall record	SLC Record
Apr. 1	Northwestern State		Maestri Field at Privateer Park • New Orleans, LA	10–2	**B. Mitchell** (5–2)	A. Makarewich (2–2)	None	ESPN+	367	15–12	2–3
Apr. 2	Northwestern State		Maestri Field at Privateer Park • New Orleans, LA	1–4	D. Brown (2–4)	**C. Mercer** (2–2)	C. Prestwich (1)	ESPN+	375	15–13	2–4
Apr. 4	at Jackson State*		Braddy Field • Jackson, MS	21–4^{(7)}	**C. Macip** (1–0)	A. Campbell (2–1)	None		36	16–13	
Apr. 6	Southeastern Louisiana		Maestri Field at Privateer Park • New Orleans, LA	10–0^{(8)}	**C. Seroski** (1–0)	B. Stuprich (3–3)	None		312	17–13	3–4
Apr. 6	Southeastern Louisiana		Maestri Field at Privateer Park • New Orleans, LA	22–2^{(7)}	**J. Williams** (1–0)	A. Hosack (1–2)	None		312	18–13	4–4
Apr. 8	Southeastern Louisiana		Maestri Field at Privateer Park • New Orleans, LA	3–2	**B. Mitchell** (6–2)	A. Landry (2–5)	**C. Mercer** (1)		355	19–13	5–4
Apr. 11	Dillard*		Maestri Field at Privateer Park • New Orleans, LA	10–0^{(7)}	**R. Delorbe** (1–0)	C. White (0–1)	None		289	20–13	
Apr. 14	at Texas A&M–Corpus Christi		Chapman Field • Corpus Christi, TX	7–6	**R. Delorbe** (2–0)	K. Dickey (1–1)	None	ESPN+	318	21–13	6–4
Apr. 15	at Texas A&M–Corpus Christi		Chapman Field • Corpus Christi, TX	3–5	C. Purcell (3–3)	**B. Mitchell** (6–3)	A. Dean (4)	ESPN+	388	21–14	6–5
Apr. 16	at Texas A&M–Corpus Christi		Chapman Field • Corpus Christi, TX	5–7	E. Hendricks (2–0)	**C. Mercer** (2–3)	H. Thomas (1)	ESPN+	352	21–15	6–6
Apr. 18	Tulane*		Maestri Field at Privateer Park • New Orleans, LA	6–8	T. Montiel (1–0)	**C. Macip** (1–1)	G. Smith (1)	ESPN+	985	21–16	
Apr. 21	at McNeese		Joe Miller Ballpark • Lake Charles, LA	1–11^{(7)}	G. Rogers (9–0)	**B. Blanchard** (0–3)	None	ESPN+	1,138	21–17	6–7
Apr. 22	at McNeese		Joe Miller Ballpark • Lake Charles, LA	9–2	**B. Mitchell** (7–3)	B. Jones (3–1)	None	ESPN+	1,233	22–17	7–7
Apr. 23	at McNeese		Joe Miller Ballpark • Lake Charles, LA	2–6	T. Abraham (1–0)	**C. Mercer** (2–4)	None	ESPN+	1,132	22–18	7–8
Apr. 25	at South Alabama*		Stanky Field • Mobile, AL	6–5	**C. Menina** (2–0)	J. Bruning (0–1)	**C. Clayton** (1)	ESPN+	1,209	23–18	
Apr. 28	at Little Rock*		Gary Hogan Field • Little Rock, AR	7–4	**J. Williams** (2–0)	J. Wells (5–3)	None	ESPN+	141	24–18	
Apr. 30	at Little Rock*		Gary Hogan Field • Little Rock, AR	3–6	N. Burkey (2–1)	**C. Mercer** (2–5)	J. Weatherley (4)	ESPN+		24–19	
Apr. 30	at Little Rock*		Gary Hogan Field • Little Rock, AR	14–5	**B. Mitchell** (8–3)	J. Weatherley (2–3)	None	ESPN+	303	25–19	

May (8–3)
Date	Opponent	Rank	Site/stadium	Score	Win	Loss	Save	TV	Attendance	Overall record	SLC Record
May 2	Jackson State*		Maestri Field at Privateer Park • New Orleans, LA	6–3	**Handy, Connor (1-0)**	Erwins Branche (0-2)	**Mead, Jacob (1)**		295	26–19	
May 5	Houston Christian		Maestri Field at Privateer Park • New Orleans, LA	9–7	**Daniel, Nolan (2-0)**	Ewald, Tim (0-2)	**Mead, Jacob (2)**	ESPN+	320	27–19	8–8
May 6	Houston Christian		Maestri Field at Privateer Park • New Orleans, LA	7–8^{(11)}	Charles, Matthew (2-1)	**Horton, Collin (2-4)**	None	ESPN+	432	27–20	8–9
May 7	Houston Christian		Maestri Field at Privateer Park • New Orleans, LA	10–6	**Seroski, Caleb (2-0)**	Valdez, Jonathan (0-3)	**Mead, Jacob (3)**	ESPN+	327	28–20	9–9
May 9	at Southern*		Lee–Hines Field • Baton Rouge, LA	15–5	**Seroski, Caleb (3-0)**	Caleb Washington (0-1)	None		162	29–20	
May 12	at Incarnate Word		Sullivan Field • San Antonio, TX	12–1^{7}	**Mitchell, Brandon (9-3)**	Schlotzhauer, R (2-1)	None	ESPN+	86	30–20	10–9
May 13	at Incarnate Word		Sullivan Field • San Antonio, TX	10–11	Hayward, Steve (7-3)	**Blanchard, Beau (0-4)**	None	ESPN+	112	30–21	10–10
May 14	at Incarnate Word		Sullivan Field • San Antonio, TX	15–5	**LeBlanc, Tyler (3-3)**	Berens, Micah (2-4)	None	ESPN+	114	31–21	11–10
May 18	Nicholls		Maestri Field at Privateer Park • New Orleans, LA	7–6	**Mitchell, Brandon (10-3)**	Desandro, Devin (2-5)	**Mead, Jacob (4)**	ESPN+	1,102	32–21	12–10
May 19	Nicholls		Maestri Field at Privateer Park • New Orleans, LA	4–10	Gearing, Chase (3-1)	**Seroski, Caleb (3-1)**	None	ESPN+	1,055	32–22	12–11
May 20	Nicholls		Maestri Field at Privateer Park • New Orleans, LA	14–4^{(8)}	**J. Williams** (2–0)	M. Quevedo (–)	None	ESPN+		33–22	13–11

Postseason (3–2)

SLC Tournament (3–2)
Date	Opponent	Seed/Rank	Site/stadium	Score	Win	Loss	Save	TV	Attendance	Overall record	Tournament record
May 24	(3) Lamar	(4)	Joe Miller Ballpark • Lake Charles, LA	4–1	**B. Mitchell** (11–3)	J. Ellis (4–5)	**J. Mead** (5)	ESPN+		34–22	1–0
May 25	(5) Northwestern State	(4)	Joe Miller Ballpark • Lake Charles, LA	4–3	**C. Seroski** (4–1)	A. Makarewich (5–5)	**D. Nolan** (1)	ESPN+		35–22	2–0
May 26	(1) Nicholls	(4)	Joe Miller Ballpark • Lake Charles, LA	3–5	T. Theriot (3–4)	**J. Williams** (3–1)	G. Galy (1)	ESPN+		35–23	2–1
May 26	(5) Northwestern State	(4)	Joe Miller Ballpark • Lake Charles, LA	7–3	**C. Horton** (3–4)	A. Cossio (0–1)	None	ESPN+		36–23	3–1
May 27	(1) Nicholls	(4)	Joe Miller Ballpark • Lake Charles, LA	3–6	Quevedo, Michael (4-2)	**Mead, Jacob (1-1)**	Evans, Cade (7)	ESPN+	443	36–24	3–2

Schedule source:

*Rankings are based on the team's current ranking in the D1Baseball poll.
