= 2023 McNeese Cowboys baseball team =

American college baseball season

2023 McNeese Cowboys baseball
- Conference: Southland Conference
- Record: 35–23 (12–12 Southland)
- Head coach: Justin Hill (10th season)
- Assistant coaches: Nick Zaleski; Jim Ricklefsen
- Home stadium: Joe Miller Ballpark

2023 Southland Conference baseball standings
	Conf.				Overall
Team	W		L	PCT	W		L	PCT
Nicholls ‍†‍‡‍^{y}	15	–	9	.625	34	–	24	.586
Incarnate Word ‍‍‍	14	–	10	.583	28	–	26	.519
New Orleans ‍‍‍	13	–	11	.542	36	–	24	.600
Lamar ‍‍‍	13	–	11	.542	32	–	23	.582
McNeese ‍‍‍	12	–	12	.500	35	–	23	.603
Northwestern State ‍‍‍	12	–	12	.500	29	–	27	.518
Texas A&M–Corpus Christi ‍‍‍	12	–	12	.500	24	–	30	.444
Southeastern Louisiana ‍‍‍	9	–	14	.391	25	–	25	.500
Houston Christian ‍‍‍	7	–	16	.304	11	–	37	.229
† – Conference champion ‡ – Tournament champion y – Invited to the NCAA Tournament; As of June 3, 2023; Rankings from D1Baseball

The 2023 McNeese Cowboys baseball team represented McNeese State University during the 2023 NCAA Division I baseball season. The Cowboys played their home games at Joe Miller Ballpark and were led by tenth–year head coach Justin Hill. They are members of the Southland Conference.

== Preseason ==
=== Southland Conference Coaches Poll ===
The Southland Conference Coaches Poll was released on February 3, 2023. McNeese was picked to finish first in the Southland Conference with 118 votes and 7 first place votes.

Coaches poll
Predicted finish	Team	Votes (1st place)
1	McNeese State	118 (7)
2	Southeastern Louisiana	115 (10)
3	Lamar	88
4	New Orleans	87
5	Northwestern State	65 (1)
6	Nicholls	59
7	Texas A&M–Corpus Christi	55
8	Houston Christian	41
9	Incarnate Word	20

=== Preseason All-Southland team ===
Five McNeese players were named to the conference preseason first team. Three McNeese players were named to the conference preseason second team.

==== First Team ====
- Edgar Alvarez (NICH, JR, 1st Base)
- Brad Burckel (MCNS, SR, 2nd Base)
- Josh Leslie (MCNS, SR, 3rd Base)
- Parker Coddou (NICH, JR, Shortstop)
- Bo Willis (NWST, JR, Catcher)
- Tre Jones (TAMUCC, JR, Designated Hitter)
- Payton Harden (MCNS, SR, Outfielder)
- Brendan Ryan (TAMUCC, SR, Outfielder)
- Xane Washington (NICH, R-SR, Outfielder)
- Zach Garcia (TAMUCC, SO, Starting Pitcher)
- Grant Rogers (MCNS, JR, Starting Pitcher)
- Tyler Theriot (NICH, SR, Starting Pitcher)
- Burrell Jones (MCNS, SR, Relief Pitcher)
- Alec Carr (UIW, SR, Utility)

==== Second Team ====
- Josh Blankenship (LU, SR, 1st Base)
- Daunte Stuart (NWST, JR, 2nd Base)
- Kasten Furr (NO, JR, 3rd Base)
- Tyler Bischke (NO, JR, Shortstop)
- Bryce Grizzaffi (SELA, SR, Catcher)
- Kade Hunter (MCNS, SR, Designated Hitter)
- Josh Caraway (TAMUCC, JR, Outfielder)
- Braden Duhon (MCNS, JR, Outfielder)
- Issac Williams (NO, JR, Outfielder)
- Cal Carver (NWST, SR, Starting Pitcher)
- Tyler LeBlanc (NO, JR, Starting Pitcher)
- Will Kinzeler (SELA, JR, Starting Pitcher)
- Dalton Aspholm (SELA, SR, Relief Pitcher)
- Tre’ Obregon III (MCNS, SR, Utility)

== Schedule and results ==
Legend
	McNeese State win
	McNeese State loss
	Postponement/Cancelation/Suspensions
**Bold**	McNeese State team member
*	Non-Conference game
†	Make-Up Game

2023 McNeese Cowboys baseball game log
Regular season (35–23)

February (4–4)
Date	Opponent	Rank	Site/stadium	Score	Win	Loss	Save	TV	Attendance	Overall record	SLC Record
Feb. 17	Creighton*		Joe Miller Ballpark • Lake Charles, LA	1–0	**Rogers, Grant (1-0)**	Ryan Windham (0-1)	**Abraham, Ty (1)**		1,015	1–0	
Feb. 18	Creighton*		Joe Miller Ballpark • Lake Charles, LA	4–9	Daniel Hammond (1-0)	**Steward, Luke (0-1)**	Tommy Steier (1)		1,001	1–1	
Feb. 19	Creighton*		Joe Miller Ballpark • Lake Charles, LA	1–5	Justin Kleinsorge (1-0)	**Voss, Zach (0-1)**			1,060	1–2	
Feb. 21	at Sam Houston*		Don Sanders Stadium • Huntsville, TX	6–18	David, Chandler (2-0)	**Steward, Luke (0-2)**		ESPN+	878	1–3	
Feb. 24	at UT Arlington*		Clay Gould Ballpark • Arlington, TX	10–4	**Rogers, Grant (2-0)**	Kuykendall, Thomas (0-1)			399	2–3	
Feb. 25	at UT Arlington*		Clay Gould Ballpark • Arlington, TX	12–8	**Vega, Christian (1-0)**	Peters, Connery (0-1)			363	3–3	
Feb. 26	at UT Arlington*		Clay Gould Ballpark • Arlington, TX	6–12	Noah, Caden (2-0)	**Voss, Zach (0-2)**	Norris, Zach (1)		351	3–4	
Feb. 28	Louisiana*		Joe Miller Ballpark • Lake Charles, LA	5–4	**Morrow, Kainin (1-0)**	Brendan Moody (0-1)	**Vega, Christian (1)**		1,405	4–4	

March (14–4)
Date	Opponent	Rank	Site/stadium	Score	Win	Loss	Save	TV	Attendance	Overall record	SLC Record
Mar. 1	at Southern*		Lee–Hines Field • Baton Rouge, LA	10–3	**Jones, Burrell (1-0)**	Antoine Harris (0-2)			268	5–4	
Mar. 3	George Washington*		Joe Miller Ballpark • Lake Charles, LA	2–0	**Rogers, Grant (3-0)**	Logan Koester (0-1)			1,043	6–4	
Mar. 4	George Washington*		Joe Miller Ballpark • Lake Charles, LA	7–0	**Cherry, Derrick (1-0)**	Austin Odell (1-3)			1,052	7–4	
Mar. 5	George Washington*		Joe Miller Ballpark • Lake Charles, LA	7–6	**Vega, Christian (2-0)**	Chris Knight (0-1)			979	8–4	
Mar. 8	at Louisiana*		M. L. Tigue Moore Field at Russo Park • Lafayette, LA	3–5	Ray, Tommy (2-0)	**Lejeune, Cameron (0-1)**	Marshall, Blake (1)		3,959	8–5	
Mar. 10	Prairie View A&M*		Joe Miller Ballpark • Lake Charles, LA	9–0	**Rogers, Grant (4-0)**	Victor Mendoza (0-2)			1,081	9–5	
Mar. 11	Prairie View A&M*		Joe Miller Ballpark • Lake Charles, LA	10–0 (8 inn)	**Cherry, Derrick (2-0)**	Michael Dews (0-3)			861	10–5	
Mar. 12	Prairie View A&M*		Joe Miller Ballpark • Lake Charles, LA	11–10	**Jones, Burrell (2-0)**	Joshua Larzabal (0-1)			1,040	11–5	
Mar. 14	Mississippi Valley State*		Joe Miller Ballpark • Lake Charles, LA	7–2	**Morrow, Kainin (2-0)**	VALENZUELA, ISAIAH (1-3)			958	12–5	
Mar. 17	Yale*		Joe Miller Ballpark • Lake Charles, LA	7–1	**Rogers, Grant (5-0)**	Reese, Bryant (1-1)			1,062	13–5	
Mar. 18	Yale*		Joe Miller Ballpark • Lake Charles, LA	8–1	**Cherry, Derrick (3-0)**	Shaw, Colton (1-1)	**Abraham, Ty (2)**		1,037	14–5	
Mar. 19	Yale*		Joe Miller Ballpark • Lake Charles, LA	9–4	**Voss, Zach (1-2)**	Easterly, Reid (2-1)	**Vega, Christian (2)**		1,030	15–5	
Mar. 21	Houston*		Joe Miller Ballpark • Lake Charles, LA	6–9	CITELLI, Cade (1-2)	**Morrow, Kainin (2-1)**	MURRAY, Justin (2)	ESPN+	1,104	15–6	
Mar. 24	Nicholls		Joe Miller Ballpark • Lake Charles, LA	8–3	**Rogers, Grant (6-0)**	Theriot, Tyler (2-4)			1,020	16–6	1–0
Mar. 25	Nicholls		Joe Miller Ballpark • Lake Charles, LA	6–8 (12 inn)	Saltaformaggio, Nico (2-0)	**Vega, Christian (2-1)**			1,320	16–7	1–1
Mar. 26	Nicholls		Joe Miller Ballpark • Lake Charles, LA	5–8	Mancuso, Josh (2-1)	**Voss, Zach (1-3)**	Saltaformaggio, Nico (2)		1,068	16–8	1–2
Mar. 28	Southern*		Joe Miller Ballpark • Lake Charles, LA	12–5	**Moeller, JT (1-0)**	Daren Smith (1-2)		ESPN+	1,017	17–8	
Mar. 31	at Houston Christian		Husky Field • Houston, TX	15–5 (7 inn)	**Rogers, Grant (7-0)**	Baumann, Baylor (0-2)			200	18–8	2–2

April (10–7)
Date	Opponent	Rank	Site/stadium	Score	Win	Loss	Save	TV	Attendance	Overall record	SLC Record
Apr. 1	at Houston Christian		Husky Field • Houston, TX	2–4	Zander, Walker (1-3)	**Cherry, Derrick (3-1)**	Smitherman, Javan (2)	ESPN+	300	18–9	2–3
Apr. 2	at Houston Christian		Husky Field • Houston, TX	10–12	Charles, Matthew (1-1)	**Vega, Christian (2-2)**	Smitherman, Javan (3)	ESPN+	250	18–10	2–4
Apr. 6	Texas A&M–Corpus Christi		Joe Miller Ballpark • Lake Charles, LA	8–3	**Rogers, Grant (8-0)**	Watson, Matthew (2-3)				19–10	3–4
Apr. 7	Texas A&M–Corpus Christi		Joe Miller Ballpark • Lake Charles, LA	3–5	Dickey, Kyle (1-0)	**Cherry, Derrick (3-2)**	Dean, Austin (3)		1,042	19–11	3–5
Apr. 8	Texas A&M–Corpus Christi		Joe Miller Ballpark • Lake Charles, LA	4–3	**Jones, Burrell (3-0)**	Purcell, Colin (2-3)	**Moeller, JT (1)**	ESPN+	1,076	20–11	4–5
Apr. 11	Louisiana Christian*		Joe Miller Ballpark • Lake Charles, LA	3–0	**Christian Vega (2–2)**	Braxton Cooksey (2-3)		ESPN+		21–11	
Apr. 12	at Rice*		Reckling Park • Houston, TX	7–6	**Hart, Cade (1-0)**	Zaskoda, G. (0-1)	Cherry, Derrick (1)	CUSAtv	1,667	22–11	
Apr. 14	at Southeastern Louisiana		Pat Kenelly Diamond at Alumni Field • Hammond, LA	7–6	**Vega, Christian (3-2)**	Lauve, Lance (2-1)	**Abraham, Ty (3)**	ESPN+	1,288	23–11	5–5
Apr. 15	at Southeastern Louisiana		Pat Kenelly Diamond at Alumni Field • Hammond, LA	7–8	Rodriguez, Jackson (1-0)	**Vega, Christian (3-3)**		ESPN+	1,178	23–12	5–6
Apr. 16	at Southeastern Louisiana		Pat Kenelly Diamond at Alumni Field • Hammond, LA	3–2	**Lejeune, Cameron (2-1)**	Rodriguez, Jackson (1-1)		ESPN+	1,263	24–12	6–6
Apr. 21	New Orleans		Joe Miller Ballpark • Lake Charles, LA	11–1 (7 inn)	**Rogers, Grant (9-0)**	Blanchard, Beau (0-3)		ESPN+	1,138	25–12	7–6
Apr. 22	New Orleans		Joe Miller Ballpark • Lake Charles, LA	2–9	Mitchell, Brandon (7-3)	**Jones, Burrell (3-1)**		ESPN+	1,233	25–13	7–7
Apr. 23	New Orleans		Joe Miller Ballpark • Lake Charles, LA	6–2	**Abraham, Ty (1-0)**	Mercer, Colton (2-4)		ESPN+	1,132	26–13	8–7
Apr. 25	LSU–Alexandria		Joe Miller Ballpark • Lake Charles, LA	8–1	**Barthelemy, Brock (1-0)**	Benevage, Zack (1-1)			1,007	27–13	
Apr. 28	at Incarnate Word		Sullivan Field • San Antonio, TX	7–8	Hayward, Steve (6-3)	**Abraham, Ty (1-1)**			84	27–14	8–8
Apr. 29	at Incarnate Word		Sullivan Field • San Antonio, TX	6–8	Cassidy, K (2-2)	**Jones, Burrell (3-2)**	Hayward, S (5)		147	27–15	8–9
Apr. 30	at Incarnate Word		Sullivan Field • San Antonio, TX	9–2	**Barthelemy, Brock (2-0)**	Berens, M (2-3)		ESPN+	110	28–15	9–9

May (5–6)
Date	Opponent	Rank	Site/stadium	Score	Win	Loss	Save	TV	Attendance	Overall record	SLC Record
Battle of the Border
May 5	Lamar		Joe Miller Ballpark • Lake Charles, LA	6–4	**Rogers, Grant (10-0)**	Ellis, Jacob (3-3)	**Abraham, Ty (4)**	ESPN+	1,674	29–15	10–9
May 6	Lamar		Joe Miller Ballpark • Lake Charles, LA	4–3	**Jones, Burrell (4-2)**	Tauzin, Kole (0-2)	Abraham, Ty (5)	ESPN+	1,172	30–15	11–9
May 7	Lamar		Joe Miller Ballpark • Lake Charles, LA	9–10	Cleveland, Jackson (1-2)	**Abraham, Ty (1-2)**	Morse, Trhea (1)	ESPN+	1,099	30–16	11–10
May 9	Nicholls*		Ben Meyer Diamond at Ray E. Didier Field • Thibodaux, LA	7–3	**Barthelemy, Brock (3-0)**	Evans, Cade (0-2)			207	31–16	
May 12	at Northwestern State		H. Alvin Brown–C. C. Stroud Field • Natchitoches, LA	2–5	Carver, Cal (6-3)	**Rogers, Grant (10-1)**	Froehlich, Kyle (7)	ESPN+	732	31–17	11–11
May 13	at Northwestern State		H. Alvin Brown–C. C. Stroud Field • Natchitoches, LA	4–2	**Abraham, Ty (2-2)**	Prestwich, Chase (4-4)	**Barthelemy, Brock (2)**	ESPN+	308	32–17	12–11
May 14	at Northwestern State		H. Alvin Brown–C. C. Stroud Field • Natchitoches, LA	4–8	Brown, Drayton (5-7)	**Jones, Burrell (4-3)**		ESPN+	328	32–18	12–12
May 16	at LSU*	5	Alex Box Stadium, Skip Bertman Field • Baton Rouge, LA	4–7	Griffin Herring (3-1)	**Barthelemy, Brock (3-1)**	Thatcher Hurd (3)	SECN+	10,576	32–19	
May 17	Miami of Ohio*		Joe Miller Ballpark • Lake Charles, LA	8–14	Nick Vardavas (3-2)	**Jones, Burrell (4-4)**	Martin Sosna (1)		1,002	32–20	
May 18	Miami of Ohio*		Joe Miller Ballpark • Lake Charles, LA	13–5	**Rogers, Grant (11-1)**	Connor Oliver (2-6)	Vega, Christian (3)		992	33–20	
May 19	Miami of Ohio*		Joe Miller Ballpark • Lake Charles, LA	6–13	Connor Preisel (2-1)	**Moeller, JT (1-1)**			975	33–21	

Postseason (2–2)

Southland Tournament (2–2)
Date	Opponent	(Seed)/Rank	Site/stadium	Score	Win	Loss	Save	TV	Attendance	Overall record	Tournament record
May 23	vs. (7) Texas A&M–Corpus Christi	(6)	Joe Miller Ballpark • Lake Charles, LA	4–0	**Rogers, Grant (12-1)**	Watson, Matthew (6-5)		ESPN+	884	34–21	1–0
May 24	vs. (1) Nicholls	(6)	Joe Miller Ballpark • Lake Charles, LA	2–3	Galy, Gavin (1-1)	**Cherry, Derrick (3-3)**		ESPN+	757	34–22	1–1
May 25	vs. (2) Incarnate Word	(6)	Joe Miller Ballpark • Lake Charles, LA	3–0	**Hudgens, Bryson (1-0)**	Berens, Micah (2-5)	Barthelemy, Brock (3)	ESPN+		35–22	2–1
May 26	vs. (5) Northwestern State	(6)	Joe Miller Ballpark • Lake Charles, LA	2–6	Brown, Drayton (6-6)	**Jones, Burrell (4-5)**		ESPN+		35–23	2–2

Schedule source:

*Rankings are based on the team's current ranking in the D1Baseball poll.
