= 2023 Houston Christian Huskies baseball team =

American college baseball season

2023 Houston Christian Huskies baseball
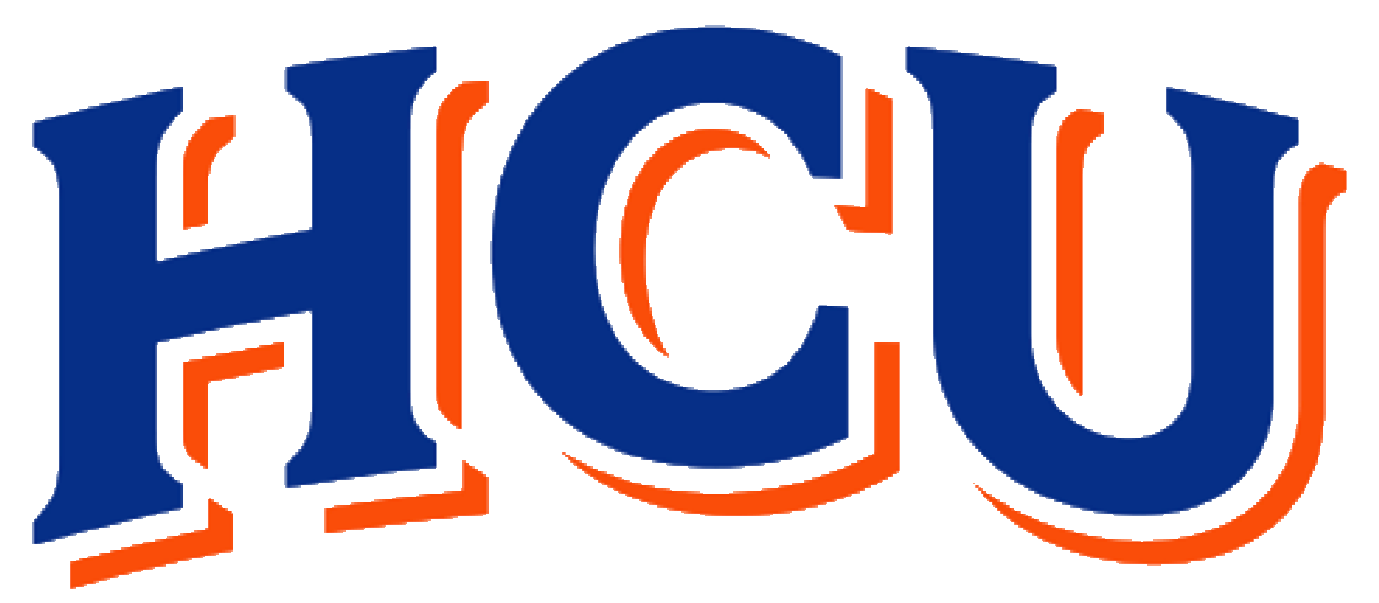
- Conference: Southland Conference
- Record: 11–37 (7–16 Southland)
- Head coach: Lance Berkman (2nd season)
- Assistant coaches: Clay Vanderlaan; Tyler Bremer; Sam McElrath
- Home stadium: Husky Field

2023 Southland Conference baseball standings
	Conf.				Overall
Team	W		L	PCT	W		L	PCT
Nicholls ‍†‍‡‍^{y}	15	–	9	.625	34	–	24	.586
Incarnate Word ‍‍‍	14	–	10	.583	28	–	26	.519
New Orleans ‍‍‍	13	–	11	.542	36	–	24	.600
Lamar ‍‍‍	13	–	11	.542	32	–	23	.582
McNeese ‍‍‍	12	–	12	.500	35	–	23	.603
Northwestern State ‍‍‍	12	–	12	.500	29	–	27	.518
Texas A&M–Corpus Christi ‍‍‍	12	–	12	.500	24	–	30	.444
Southeastern Louisiana ‍‍‍	9	–	14	.391	25	–	25	.500
Houston Christian ‍‍‍	7	–	16	.304	11	–	37	.229
† – Conference champion ‡ – Tournament champion y – Invited to the NCAA Tournament; As of June 3, 2023; Rankings from D1Baseball

The 2023 Houston Christian Huskies baseball team represented Houston Christian University, during the 2023 NCAA Division I baseball season. The Huskies played their home games at Husky Field and were led by second–year head coach Lance Berkman, former star player with the Houston Astros. They are members of the Southland Conference.

== Preseason ==
=== Southland Conference Coaches poll ===
The Southland Conference Coaches poll was released on February 3, 2023. Houston Christian was picked to finish eighth in the Southland Conference with 41 votes.

Coaches poll
Predicted finish	Team	Votes (1st place)
1	McNeese State	118 (7)
2	Southeastern Louisiana	115 (10)
3	Lamar	88
4	New Orleans	87
5	Northwestern State	65 (1)
6	Nicholls	59
7	Texas A&M–Corpus Christi	55
8	Houston Christian	41
9	Incarnate Word	20

=== Preseason All-Southland team ===
No Houston Christian players were named to a conference preseason team.

==== First Team ====
- Edgar Alvarez (NICH, JR, 1st Base)
- Brad Burckel (MCNS, SR, 2nd Base)
- Josh Leslie (MCNS, SR, 3rd Base)
- Parker Coddou (NICH, JR, Shortstop)
- Bo Willis (NWST, JR, Catcher)
- Tre Jones (TAMUCC, JR, Designated Hitter)
- Payton Harden (MCNS, SR, Outfielder)
- Brendan Ryan (TAMUCC, SR, Outfielder)
- Xane Washington (NICH, R-SR, Outfielder)
- Zach Garcia (TAMUCC, SO, Starting Pitcher)
- Grant Rogers (MCNS, JR, Starting Pitcher)
- Tyler Theriot (NICH, SR, Starting Pitcher)
- Burrell Jones (MCNS, SR, Relief Pitcher)
- Alec Carr (UIW, SR, Utility)

==== Second Team ====
- Josh Blankenship (LU, SR, 1st Base)
- Daunte Stuart (NWST, JR, 2nd Base)
- Kasten Furr (NO, JR, 3rd Base)
- Tyler Bischke (NO, JR, Shortstop)
- Bryce Grizzaffi (SELA, SR, Catcher)
- Kade Hunter (MCNS, SR, Designated Hitter)
- Josh Caraway (TAMUCC, JR, Outfielder)
- Braden Duhon (MCNS, JR, Outfielder)
- Issac Williams (NO, JR, Outfielder)
- Cal Carver (NWST, SR, Starting Pitcher)
- Tyler LeBlanc (NO, JR, Starting Pitcher)
- Will Kinzeler (SELA, JR, Starting Pitcher)
- Dalton Aspholm (SELA, SR, Relief Pitcher)
- Tre’ Obregon III (MCNS, SR, Utility)

== Schedule and results ==
Legend
	Houston Christian win
	Houston Christian loss
	Postponement/Cancelation/Suspensions
**Bold**	Houston Christian team member
*	Non-Conference game
†	Make-Up Game

2023 Houston Christian Huskies baseball game log
Regular season (11–37)

February (0–8)
Date	Opponent	Rank	Site/stadium	Score	Win	Loss	Save	TV	Attendance	Overall record	SLC record
Feb. 17	at Texas–Rio Grande Valley*		UTRGV Baseball Stadium • Edinburg, TX	0–10	Aldaz, Jesus (1-0)	Gunter, Rye (0-1)		ESPN+	1,876	0–1	
Feb. 18	at Texas–Rio Grande Valley*		UTRGV Baseball Stadium • Edinburg, TX	6–10	Cabral, Angelo (1-0)	Zander, Walker (0-1)	Tjelmeland, Zach (1)	ESPN+	1,519	0–2	
Feb. 19	at Texas–Rio Grande Valley*		UTRGV Baseball Stadium • Edinburg, TX	4–10	Verdugo, Alex (1-0)	Baumann, Baylor (0-1)		ESPN+	1,061	0–3	
Feb. 21	at Baylor*		Baylor Ballpark • Waco, TX	4–11	Oliver, Hambleton (1-0)	Ripoll, Will (0-1)		ESPN+	1,810	0–4	
Sugar Land Classic
Feb. 24	vs. Stephen F. Austin*		Constellation Field • Sugar Land, TX	14–21 (15 inn)	Bowyer, Reid (1-0)	Jarek Wells (0-1)				0–5	
Feb. 25	vs. Seton Hall*		Constellation Field • Sugar Land, TX	4–7	Frontera (1-1)	Zander, Walker (0-2)	Cinnella (1)			0–6	
Feb. 26	vs. Lamar*		Constellation Field • Sugar Land, TX	3–4 (10 inn)	Cleveland (3-0)	Wells, Jarek (0-2)				0–7	
Feb. 28	at Texas A&M*		Olsen Field at Blue Bell Park • College Station, TX	0–23 (7 inn)	Ty Sexton (1-0)	Valdez, Jonathan (0-1)		SECN+	4,775	0–8	

March (3–13)
Date	Opponent	Rank	Site/stadium	Score	Win	Loss	Save	TV	Attendance	Overall record	SLC record
Mar. 3	at Abilene Christian*		Crutcher Scott Field • Abilene, TX	3–13 (8 inn)	Boggan, Drake (1-0)	**Wilson, Nolan (0-1)**		ESPN+	519	0–9	
Mar. 4	at Abilene Christian*		Crutcher Scott Field • Abilene, TX	6–12	Krkovski, Luke (1-0)	**Charles, Matthew (0-1)**		ESPN+	499	0–10	
Mar. 4	at Abilene Christian*		Crutcher Scott Field • Abilene, TX	5–9	Eichelberger, Breck (1-0)	**Zander, Walker (0-3)**		ESPN+	456	0–11	
Mar. 5	at Abilene Christian*		Crutcher Scott Field • Abilene, TX	8–7	**Ricker, Chad (1-1)**	Boggan, Drake (1-1)			355	1–11	
Mar. 10	at Rice*		Reckling Park • Houston, TX	1–5	Parker Smith (1-1)	**Gunter, Rye (0-2)**	Matthew Linskey (1)		1,925	1–12	
Mar. 11	at Rice*		Reckling Park • Houston, TX	12–14	Brogdon, B (1-1)	**Ricker, Chad (1-1)**	Raj, Krishna (1)		2,173	1–13	
Mar. 12	at Rice*		Reckling Park • Houston, TX	6–7	Ben-Shoshan (1-0)	**Ryan, Zach (0-1)**	Cienfuegos (2)		2,139	1–14	
Mar. 14	at Sam Houston*		Don Sanders Stadium • Huntsville, TX	4–6	David, C. (3-0)	**Ewald, Tim (0-1)**			602	1–15	
Mar. 17	North Dakota State*		Husky Field • Houston, TX	7–10 (7 inn)	Reese Ligtenberg (1-0)	**Ricker, Chad (1-2)**	Skyler Riedinger (1)		103	1–16	
Mar. 18	North Dakota State*		Husky Field • Houston, TX	5–6	Max Loven (1-1)	**Wells, Jarek (0-2)**	Carson Jacobs (1)		135	1–17	
Mar. 19	North Dakota State*		Husky Field • Houston, TX	6–5	**Ricker, Chad (2-2)**	Wyatt Nelson (0-1)	**Ryan, Zach (1)**		121	2–17	
Mar. 22	at Texas State*		Bobcat Baseball Stadium • San Marcos, TX	7–13	Wofford, Otto (2-0)	**Valdez, Jonathan (0-2)**		ESPN+	1,339	2–18	
Mar. 24	at Incarnate Word		Sullivan Field • San Antonio, TX	3–7 (11 inn)	Hayward, Steve (3-1)	**Smitherman, Javan (0-1)**		ESPN+	230	2–19	0–1
Mar. 25	at Incarnate Word		Sullivan Field • San Antonio, TX	6–7	Schlotzhauer, R (2-0)	**Farrow, Daniel (0-1)**	Garcia, EJ (2)	ESPN+	110	2–20	0–2
Mar. 26	at Incarnate Word		Sullivan Field • San Antonio, TX	7–6	**Ricker, Chad (3-2)**	Hayward, Steve (3-2)	**Smitherman, Javan (1)**	ESPN+	157	3–20	1–2
Mar. 31	McNeese		Husky Field • Houston, TX	5–15 (7 inn)	Rogers, Grant (7-0)	**Baumann, Baylor (0-2)**		ESPN+	200	3–21	1–3

April (6–9)
Date	Opponent	Rank	Site/stadium	Score	Win	Loss	Save	TV	Attendance	Overall record	SLC record
Apr. 1	McNeese		Husky Field • Houston, TX	4–2	**Zander, Walker (1-3)**	Cherry, Derrick (3-1)	**Smitherman, Javan (2)**	ESPN+	300	4–21	2–3
Apr. 2	McNeese		Husky Field • Houston, TX	12–10	**Charles, Matthew (1-1)**	Vega, Christian (2-2)	**Smitherman, Javan (3)**	ESPN+		5–21	3–3
Apr. 7	vs. Texas–Rio Grande Valley*		Sullivan Field • San Antonio, TX	Cancelled							
Apr. 8	vs. Texas–Rio Grande Valley*		Sullivan Field • San Antonio, TX	5–16	Cabral, A (6-0)	**Baumann, Baylor (0-2)**			200	5–22	
Apr. 8	vs. Texas–Rio Grande Valley*		Sullivan Field • San Antonio, TX	11–10 (13 inn)	**Ricker, Chad (4-2)**	Rodriguez, N (0-2)			200	6–22	
Apr. 11	at Prairie View A&M*		John W. Tankersley Field • Prairie View, TX	Cancelled							
Apr. 12	at Prairie View A&M*		John W. Tankersley Field • Prairie View, TX	Cancelled							
Apr. 14	Northwestern State		Husky Field • Houston, TX	14–13	**Smitherman, Javan (1-1)**	Froehlich, Kyle (3-1)	Austin, Morris (1)		150	7–22	4–3
Apr. 16	Northwestern State		Constellation Field • Sugar Land, TX	14–7	**Gunter, Rye (1-2)**	Brown, Drayton (2-5)		ESPN+	200	8–22	5–3
Apr. 16	Northwestern State		Constellation Field • Sugar Land, TX	5–16 (7 inn)	Cossio, Andrew (1-1)	**Ripoli, Will (0-2)**		ESPN+	200	8–23	5–4
Apr. 18	at Houston*		Darryl & Lori Schroeder Park • Houston, TX	7–13	CUNNINGHAM, Braedyn (1-0)	**Farrow, Daniel (0-2)**		ESPN+	1,077	8–24	
Apr. 21	at Nicholls		Ben Meyer Diamond at Ray E. Didier Field • Thibodaux, LA	7–16	Galy, Gavin (1-0)	**Wells, Jarek (0-3)**		ESPN+		8–25	5–5
Apr. 22	at Nicholls		Ben Meyer Diamond at Ray E. Didier Field • Thibodaux, LA	5–13	Quevedo, Michael (3-0)	**Zander, Walker (1-4)**	Jordan, Harper (1)	ESPN+	501	8–26	5–6
Apr. 23	at Nicholls		Ben Meyer Diamond at Ray E. Didier Field • Thibodaux, LA	5–6	Mayers, Jacob (5-1)	**Ripoll, Will (0-3)**		ESPN+	613	8–27	5–7
Apr. 25	at UTSA*	23	Roadrunner Field • San Antonio, TX	8–9	BEAIRD, Ryan (2-1)	**Smitherman, Javan (1-2)**			446	8–28	
Apr. 28	Texas A&M–Corpus Christi		Husky Field • Houston, TX	7–12	Watson, Matthew (4-3)	**Gunter, Rye (1-3)**		ESPN+	350	8–29	5–8
Apr. 29	Texas A&M–Corpus Christi		Husky Field • Houston, TX	7–6	**Zander, Walker (2-4)**	Purcell, Colin (3-5)	**Austin, Morris (2)**	ESPN+	250	9–29	6–8
Apr. 30	Texas A&M–Corpus Christi		Husky Field • Houston, TX	2–7	Hendricks, Evans (3-0)	**Ripoll, Will (0-4)**		ESPN+	300	9–30	6–9

May (2–7)
Date	Opponent	Rank	Site/stadium	Score	Win	Loss	Save	TV	Attendance	Overall record	SLC record
May 2	Stephen F. Austin*		Jaycees Field • Nacogdoches, TX	14–7	**Baumann, Baylor (1-3)**	S. Jaco (2-3)		ESPN+	189	10–30	
May 5	at New Orleans		Maestri Field at Privateer Park • New Orleans, LA	7–9	Daniel, Nolan (2-0)	**Ewald, Tim (0-2)**	Mead, Jacob (2)	ESPN+	320	10–31	6–10
May 6	at New Orleans		Maestri Field at Privateer Park • New Orleans, LA	8–7 (11 inn)	**Charles, Matthew (2-1)**	Horton, Collin (2-4)		ESPN+	432	11–31	7–10
May 7	at New Orleans		Maestri Field at Privateer Park • New Orleans, LA	6–10	Seroski, Caleb (2-0)	**Valdez, Jonathan (0-3)**	Mead, Jacob (3)	ESPN+	327	11–32	7–11
May 12	Southeastern Louisiana		Reckling Park • Houston, TX	4–5	Will Kinzeler (5-1)	**Rye Gunter (1-4)**	Conner Spencer (1)	ESPN+	200	11–33	7–12
May 12	Southeastern Louisiana		Reckling Park • Houston, TX	5–9	Stuprich, Brennan (4-5)	**Ricker, Chad (1-1)**	**Guth, Adam (1)**	ESPN+	215	11–34	7–13
May 13	Southeastern Louisiana		Husky Field • Houston, TX	Cancelled							
May 18	at Lamar		Vincent–Beck Stadium • Beaumont, TX	1–11 (7 inn)	Ellis, Jacob (4-4)	**Gunter, Rye (1-5)**	Waterhouse, Quinn (1)	ESPN+	1,098	11–35	7–14
May 19	at Lamar		Vincent–Beck Stadium • Beaumont, TX	3–10	Hesseltine, Hunter (4-1)	**Baumann, Baylor (1-4)**		ESPN+	1,614	11–36	7–15
May 20	at Lamar		Vincent–Beck Stadium • Beaumont, TX	5–9	Caple, Brooks (5-0)	**Ewald, Tim (0-3)**	Cole, Daniel (3)	ESPN+	1,444	11–37	7–16

Schedule source:

*Rankings are based on the team's current ranking in the D1Baseball poll.
