= Mike Silva =

American baseball coach and former catcher

Current position
- Title: Head coach
- Team: Arkansas State
- Conference: Sun Belt
- Record: 55–52 (.514)

Biographical details
- Education: Northwestern Oklahoma State University

Playing career
- 2001–2003: Northwestern Oklahoma State
- Position: Catcher

Coaching career (HC unless noted)
- 2003–2005: Clarendon College (Asst)
- 2006: Bethany (KS) (Asst)
- 2007–2009: Clarendon College
- 2010–2012: Galveston College
- 2013–2015: Texas State (Asst)
- 2016: San Diego Padres (Area Scout)
- 2017–2018: Arkansas-Little Rock (P)
- 2019–2021: Louisiana Tech (AHC)
- 2022–2024: Nicholls
- 2025–present: Arkansas State

Head coaching record
- Overall: 153–123–0 (.554) (NCAA): 165–117–0 (.585) (NJCAA)
- Tournaments: Southland: 4–0; NCAA: 0–4

Accomplishments and honors

Championships
- Southland Regular season (2023); 2 Southland Conference Tournament (2023, 2024)

Awards
- Southland Coach of the Year (2023)

Michael Silva is an American baseball coach and former catcher, who is the current head baseball coach of the Arkansas State Red Wolves. He previously was head coach of the Nicholls State baseball team. Silva has been a baseball coach in the South Central United States since 2003, after playing three years of college baseball at Northwestern Oklahoma State University.

== Coaching career ==
=== Lower division NCAA baseball ===
Silva began his coaching career in 2003, as an assistant coach at Clarendon College and Bethany College. In 2007, Silva returned to Clarendon to accept his first head coaching position, later moving to Galveston College.

=== NCAA Division I coach ===
In 2013, Silva accepted his first Division I coaching position at Texas State. After a year scouting for the San Diego Padres in 2016, Silva would go on to coach at Arkansas-Little Rock and Louisiana Tech.

On July 9, 2021, Nicholls announced that Silva would become the program's head coach after Seth Thibodeaux departed to take an assistant coaching position at Louisiana.

On June 11, 2024, Arkansas State announced the hiring of Silva as the new head coach, replacing Tommy Raffo.

== Head coaching record ==
Record table
Season	Team	Overall	Conference	Standing	Postseason
Clarendon College Bulldogs (WJCAC) (2007–2009)
Clarendon College (NJCAA):		104–44 (.703)	0–0 (–)		
Galveston College Whitecaps (TEC) (2010–2012)
Galveston College (NJCAA):		61–73 (.455)	0–0 (–)		
Nicholls Colonels (Southland Conference) (2022–2024)
2022	Nicholls	26–25	12–12	T-4th	
2023	Nicholls	34–24	15–9	1st	NCAA Regional
2024	Nicholls	38–22	16–8	2nd	NCAA Regional
Nicholls:		98–71 (.580)	43–29 (.597)		
Arkansas State Red Wolves (Sun Belt Conference) (2025–present)
2025	Arkansas State	26–28	14–16	T–7th	Sun Belt Tournament
2026	Arkansas State	29–24	12–18	T–11th	
Arkansas State:		55–52 (.514)	26–34 (.433)		
Total:		153–123 (.554)			
National champion Postseason invitational champion Conference regular season champion Conference regular season and conference tournament champion Division regular season champion Division regular season and conference tournament champion Conference tournament champion
