= Joe Miller Ballpark =

Baseball stadium in Lake Charles, Louisiana

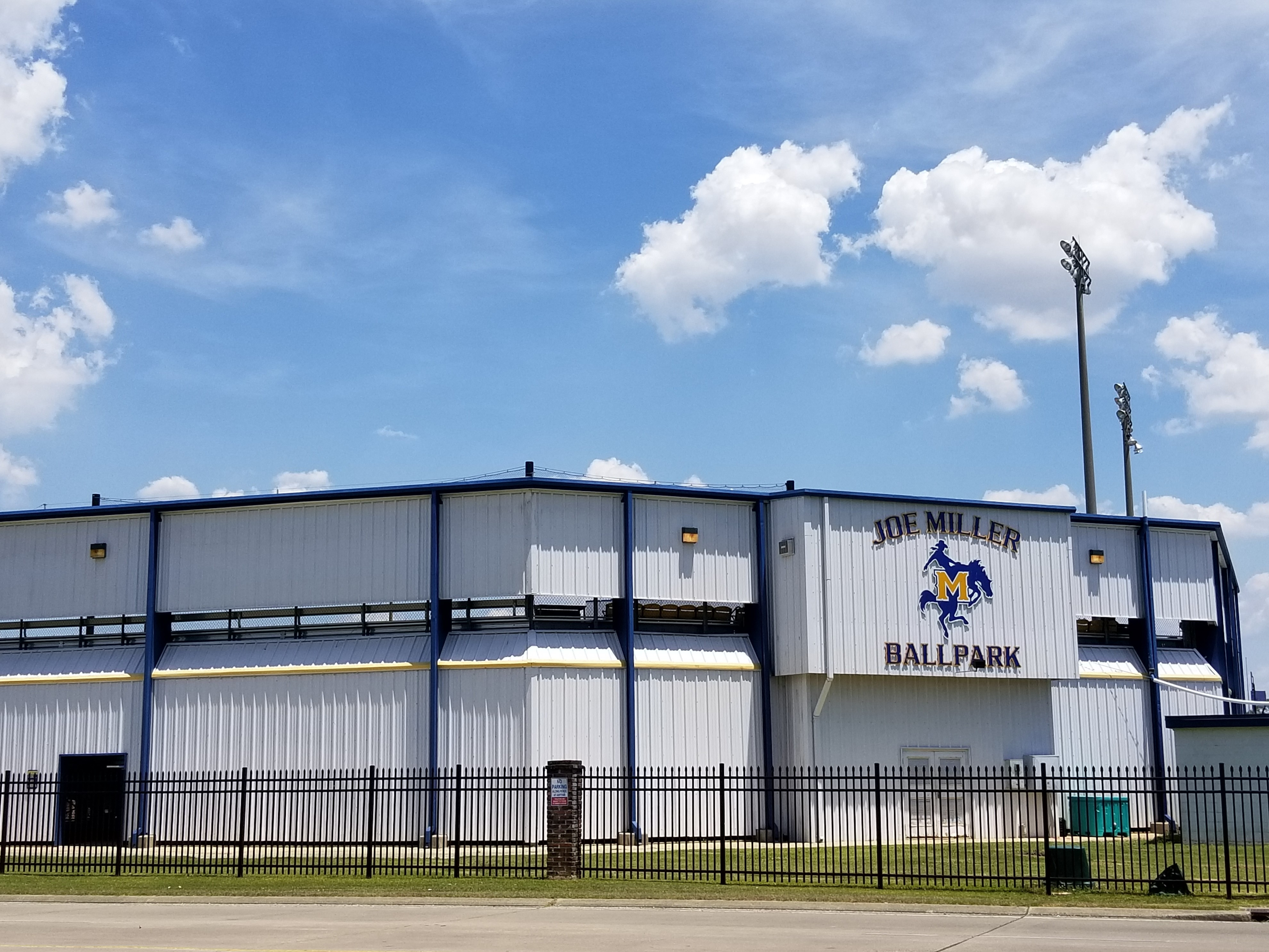
- Interactive map of Joe Miller Ballpark
- Location: Common Street and Contour Drive, Lake Charles, Louisiana, United States
- Coordinates: 30°10′22.6″N 93°12′48.2″W
- Owner: McNeese State University
- Operator: McNeese State University
- Capacity: 2,000
- Surface: Natural turf
- Scoreboard: Daktronics
- Record attendance: 2,191 (May 2, 2000, vs. LSU)
- Field size: 330 ft. (LF), 375 ft. (LCF), 400 ft. (CF), 375 ft. (RCF), 330 ft. (RF)

Construction
- Built: 1965
- Renovated: 2005, 2007, 2008, 2014

Tenant
- McNeese State Cowboys baseball (Southland)

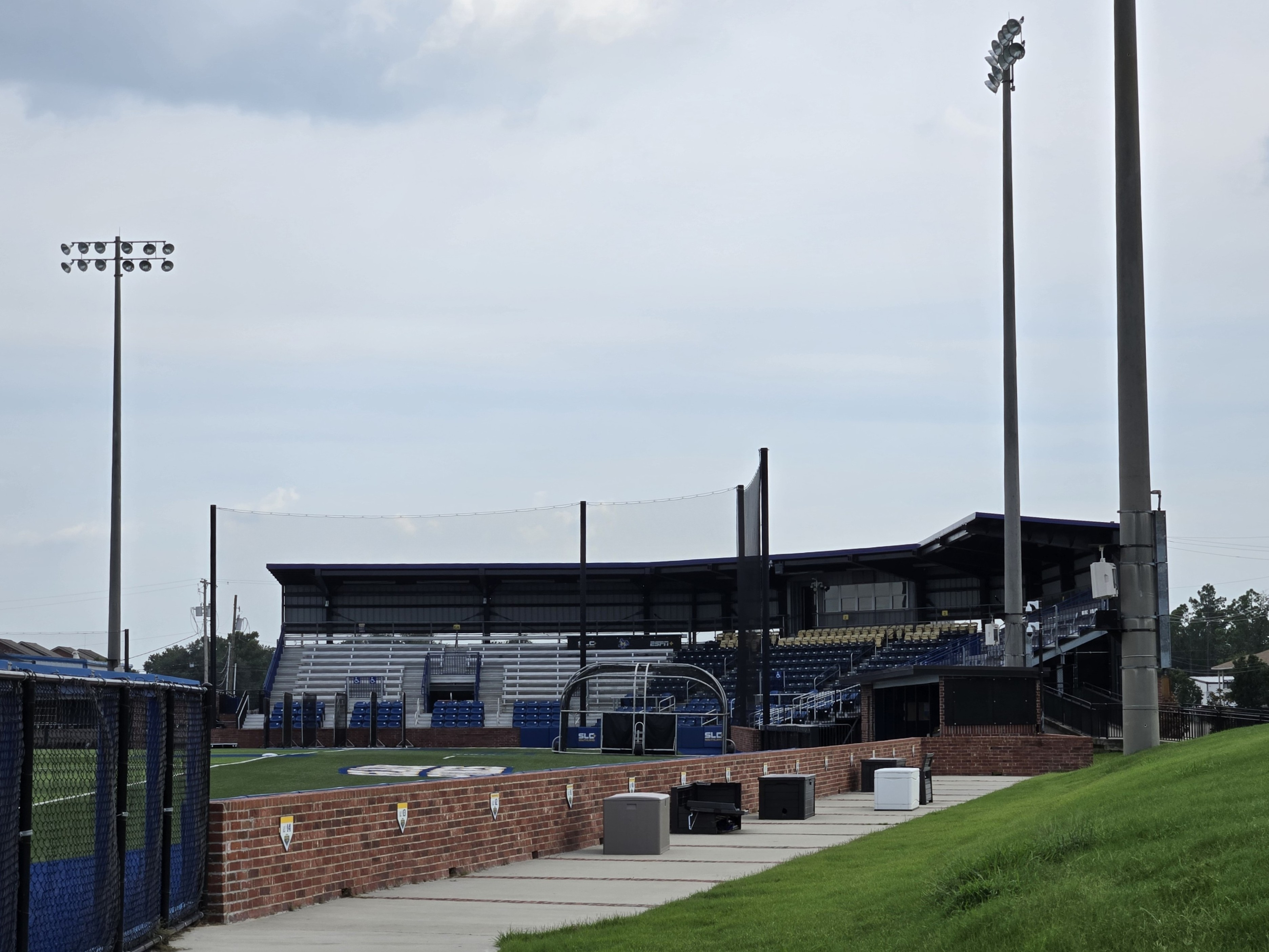
Joe Miller Ballpark grandstand

Joe Miller Ballpark is a baseball venue in Lake Charles, Louisiana, United States. It is home to the McNeese State Cowboys baseball team of the NCAA Division I Southland Conference. Opened in 1965, the venue has a capacity of 2,000 spectators. Its record attendance came one May 2, 2000, when 2,191 spectators saw McNeese State defeat LSU 4–3 in 11 innings. The facility was renovated in 2005, 2007, and 2008. Not to be confused with Joe Miller Field, which is McNeese's softball venue.

== Renovations ==
In 2005, a Daktronics scoreboard with a message board was installed. In 2007, a new outfield fence was built after the old fence was destroyed by Hurricane Rita. In 2008, new chairback seating (behind home plate) and bleacher seating (along the first and third baselines) were installed. Additionally, the infield was laser-leveled and wheelchair accessibility was improved with new ramps to the venue's seating areas.

In 2014, the first part of a multi-phase upgrade began with installation of infield turf. According to the project announcement, "...The new surface will make up the entire infield and foul territories and includes the batter's area and baselines. The only dirt on the field will be the pitcher's mound..." Joseph T. Miller, Sr. presented the McNeese Foundation a check for $300,000 to help finance the infield turf project. Future planned upgrades announced include a new entrance court and ticket booths, elevated deck seating, VIP seating, and new fencing.

== See also ==
- List of NCAA Division I baseball venues
