= List of Louisiana State University alumni =

The following is a list of notable alumni of Louisiana State University.

== Academia ==
- Jonathan Alexander (PhD 1993), rhetorician and professor of English at University of California, Irvine
- Ray Authement (MA 1952, PhD 1956), fifth president of the University of Louisiana at Lafayette, 1974–2008; longest serving president of a public university in the United States; received two graduate degrees from LSU; "father of Louisiana state archives"
- Margaret H. Christ (BS,1999), director of J. M. Tull School of Accounting, University of Georgia
- Sally Clausen (three LSU degrees in 1967, 1971, and 1980), former Louisiana commissioner of higher education; former president of Southeastern Louisiana University
- Fred C. Cole (PhD, history 1941), librarian, editor, and historian
- John R. Conniff (MA 1923 English), New Orleans and Baton Rouge educator; president of Louisiana Tech University 1926–1928
- John B. Conway (PhD 1965), professor emeritus of mathematics at George Washington University
- Edwin Adams Davis (PhD in history from LSU), former professor of History at LSU; author of two textbooks
- Colleen Denney (BA 1981, MA 1983), professor of Art History and Gender and Women's Studies at the University of Wyoming
- Ronald G. Douglas (PhD 1962), Distinguished Professor of Mathematics at Texas A&M University
- Kathleen Fitzpatrick, former professor of English at Pomona College; director of Digital Humanities and professor of English at Michigan State University
- Michelle K. Johnston (PhD 1999), Clifton A. Morvant Distinguished Professor in Business at Loyola University New Orleans
- Michael I. Jordan (BS Psychology 1974), leading researcher in machine learning at University of California, Berkeley
- Joomyeong Kim (PhD 1995), Russell Thompson, Jr. Family Professor of Biology at LSU
- Jeffrey A. Lockwood (PhD entomology), award-winning author and University of Wyoming professor of Natural Sciences and Humanities
- Ray Marshall, professor emeritus of the Audre and Bernard Rapoport Centennial Chair in Economics and Public Affairs at the University of Texas at Austin
- Sandra Murchinson (MFA), director of the School of Art and Design at Eastern Michigan University
- Leon C. Megginson (PhD 1952), later became an LSU faculty member in the business school, notable in part for his clarifying statements about Darwinism
- Fredrick Muyia Nafukho, vice provost for Academic Personnel, professor of Management and Organization at Foster School of Business
- J. Tinsley Oden (BS 1959), pioneer in the field of computational mechanics; professor at University of Texas at Austin
- Virgil Orr (BS, MS 1948, PhD 1950, chemical engineering), Louisiana Tech University vice president; former state representative from Lincoln and Union parishes
- Arthur T. Prescott (BA 1883), later M.A., first president of Louisiana Tech University (1895–1899)
- Bin Ramke, professor at University of Denver, poet, winner of the 1978 Yale Younger Poets Prize
- Charles P. Roland (PhD), historian at Tulane University and the University of Kentucky and specialist in the American Civil War and the American South
- Ralph L. Ropp (MA 1925), professor at Northwestern State University 1923–1949; president of Louisiana Tech University 1949–1962
- Martha Serpas (BA), poet, professor of creative writing in University of Houston Creative Writing Program
- Annette Shelby (PhD), first female tenured professor at the McDonough School of Business
- David S. Stern (BA 1977), provost and professor of Philosophy at The University of Tampa
- Robert B. Stobaugh (PhD), retired professor of Harvard Business School and currently at Rice University
- Virgil Suárez (MFA 1987), professor of English at Florida State University, award-winning writer
- Joe Gray Taylor (PhD 1951), professor of history at McNeese State University
- Ivory A. Toldson (BS 1995), educational scholar, counseling psychology professor at Howard University, and award-winning author
- Olympia Vernon (MFA 2002), author, Hallie Ford Chair in Writing at Willamette University
- Richard M. Weaver (PhD English), professor of English at the University of Chicago, known for the book, Ideas Have Consequences
- Allen Wier (MA), professor at University of Tennessee
- Dara Wier, director of MFA Program for Poets & Writers at the University of Massachusetts Amherst, award-winning poet
- John D. Winters (BA, MA, PhD), historian, Louisiana Tech University

== Business, economics, entrepreneurs ==
- Clarence P. Cazalot, Jr., president and chief executive of Marathon Oil Corporation
- Pollyanna Chu, Hong Kong businesswoman
- Lod Cook, co-chairman of the board of Global Crossing
- Ruth Fertel, founder of Ruth's Chris Steak House
- Éric Guimbeau, CEO of St Aubin Ltd and member of parliament in Mauritius
- Starr Long, game producer at the companies Origin Systems (1992–2000), Destination Games (2000–2008), and Portalarium (2013–present)
- William S. Patout, III, Iberia Parish sugar grower
- L. J. Sevin, founder of Mostek and of Sevin Rosen Funds, 1930–2015 (D)
- Patrick F. Taylor, founder and CEO of Taylor Energy Company; educational philanthropist, founder of the TOPS college tuition program

== Entertainment, actors, models ==
- Elizabeth Ashley, actress
- Kirk Bovill, actor, writer, songwriter
- Kenneth Brown, interior designer, host of HGTV show reDesign
- Lenora Champagne (BA 1972), playwright, theatre performer, and director
- Christina Cuenca, Miss Louisiana USA 2006
- Greg Tarzan Davis, actor
- Jennifer Dupont, Triple Crown winner, Miss Louisiana Teen USA 1998, Miss Louisiana USA 2000, Miss Louisiana (America) 2004
- Katherine Haik, Miss Louisiana Teen USA 2015 and Miss Teen USA 2015
- Eddie Jemison, actor
- Ali Landry, actress, model, Miss USA 1996
- Amanda Joseph, Miss Louisiana (America) 2007
- Rod Masterson (Class of 1967), actor
- Elizabeth McNulty, Miss Louisiana USA 2007
- Lindsey Pelas, glamour model
- Shelley Regner, actress
- Alex Stein, comedian
- Joanne Woodward, actress

== Fine arts, design ==
- Pap Dean, political cartoonist, author and illustrator
- Malaika Favorite, visual artist and writer
- J. G. Jones, comic book artist
- Fonville Winans, photographer
- Will Wright, game designer, The Sims creator
- Robert Yarber (MFA 1973), painter, professor of Art at Pennsylvania State University

== Music ==
- Mose Allison, jazz pianist, vocalist and songwriter
- Les Beasley, Southern Gospel musician
- Better Than Ezra, alternative rock band, formed at Louisiana State
  - Tom Drummond, bassist for Better Than Ezra
  - Kevin Griffin, lead singer of Better Than Ezra, songwriter
- Bill Conti, Academy Award and Emmy-winning composer
- Jordan Davis, country pop artist
- Lauren Daigle, contemporary Christian music artist
- Dee-1, rapper/lyricist
- Carl Fontana, jazz trombonist
- Julie Giroux, composer
- Grits Gresham, outdoorsman, author, sportsman, co-host of ABC's The American Sportsman (1966–1979)
- John Thomas Griffith, guitarist in rock band Cowboy Mouth
- Fatma Ceren Necipoğlu, Turkish harpist
- Lisette Oropesa, operatic soprano
- H. Owen Reed, composer
- Claibe Richardson, composer
- Chad Shelton, operatic tenor

== Journalists ==
- Brett Blackledge, reporter for The Associated Press in Washington D.C.; while working for The Birmingham News, won the 2007 Pulitzer Prize for investigative reporting
- Chris Branch, reporter for The Athletic
- Donna Britt, television news anchorwoman
- Don Lemon, news anchor and journalist
- Edwin Newman, NBC-TV newsman and anchor
- Rex Reed, film critic

== Poets, novelists, writers ==
- Julie Cantrell (B.A. 1995, M.A. 1997), novelist and editor
- A. Wilson Greene (M.A. 1977), Civil War historian, museum director, and author
- Camille Martin, poet and collage artist
- Casey McQuiston (B.A., journalism), author of Red, White, & Royal Blue
- Dinty W. Moore (MFA 1990), novelist and essayist
- Nic Pizzolatto, novelist, writer, and creator of HBO series True Detective
- Lisa Rhoades, poet
- Rebecca Wells, author of Divine Secrets of the Ya-Ya Sisterhood
- Dede Wilson, poet and writer

== Government, politics, and activism ==
=== A ===
- Eduardo Aguirre, former United States ambassador to Spain and Andorra
- A. Leonard Allen, late U.S. representative from Alexandria-based district (D)

=== B ===
- Tony Bacala, member of the Louisiana House of Representatives for Ascension Parish; law-enforcement officer
- Reggie Bagala, member of the Louisiana House of Representatives for the 54th district for four months
- Larry S. Bankston (bachelor's degree, 1973), lawyer and former state senator from Baton Rouge (D)
- Guy Bannister, FBI agent; assistant superintendent of the New Orleans Police Department, and private investigator; subject of Orleans Parish District Attorney Jim Garrison's JFK assassination investigation
- Edwards Barham, planter; former state senator from Morehouse Parish (R)
- Taylor Barras (Class of 1979), accountant and banker; current state representative from Iberia Parish (R)
- Greg Barro, member of the Louisiana State Senate
- Carl W. Bauer (Class of 1954), lawyer; former member of both houses of the Louisiana State Legislature from St. Mary Parish (D)
- Lottie Beebe, Republican member since 2012 of the Louisiana Board of Elementary and Secondary Education from Breaux Bridge; school superintendent in St. Martin Parish since 2013, received master's degree from LSU (R)
- Clyde F. Bel, Jr., businessman and state representative for Orleans Parish, 1964–1972 and 1975–1980
- Ashley Bell, national director of African American Engagement Office; director of the Small Business Administration's Southeast Region
- Stuart Bishop, member of the Louisiana House of Representatives from Lafayette (R)
- Morton Blackwell, Republican National Committeeman from Virginia, formerly a political activist in Louisiana (R)
- James E. Bolin, late former state representative (1940–1944); 26th Judicial District Court judge, 1952–1960; state appeal court judge, 1960–1978 (D)
- Charles Boustany, physician, former U.S. representative from Louisiana's 7th congressional district (R)

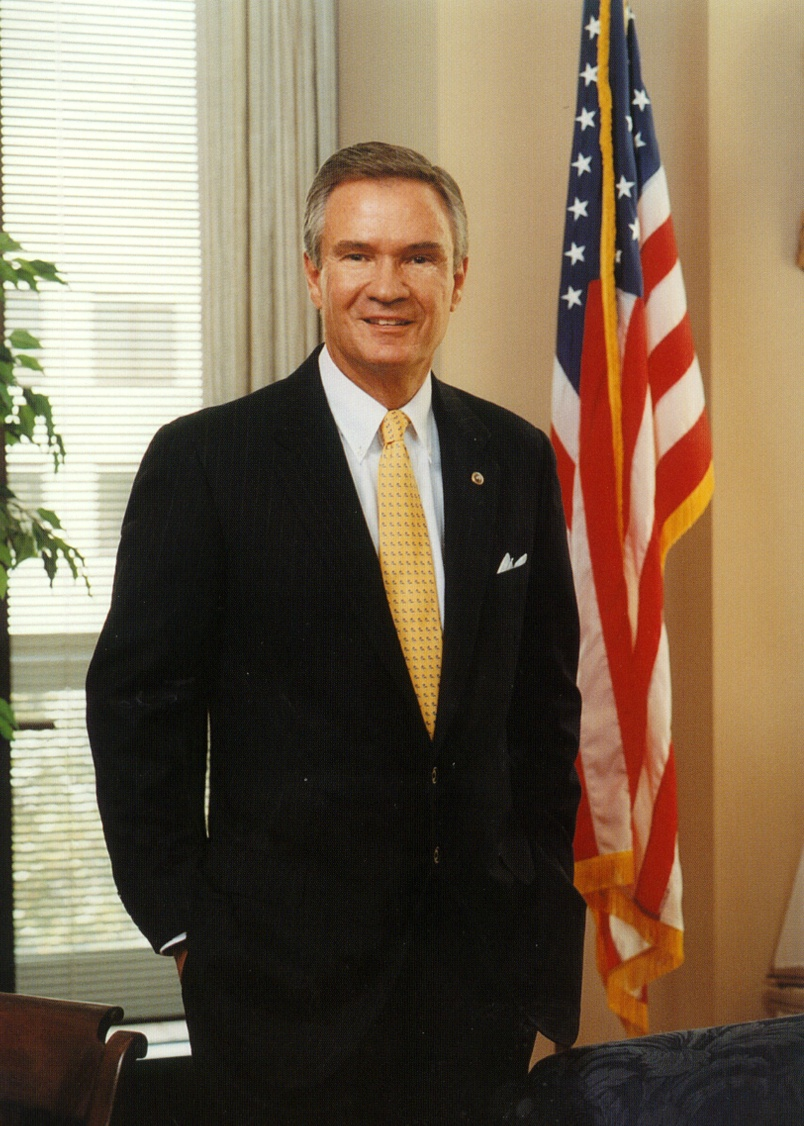
John Breaux

- Mike Branch, commercial pilot from Las Vegas, Nevada, who served in the Louisiana State Senate 1996–2000 (R)
- Donna Brazile, political strategist for Al Gore's 2000 presidential campaign (D)
- John Breaux, former chairman of the Special Committee on Aging 2001-2003, former United States Senate from Louisiana 1987-2005, former member of the United States House of Representatives from Louisiana's 7th district 1972-1987.
- Overton Brooks, late U.S. congressman from Shreveport (D)
- Edwin S. Broussard (Class of 1896), former United States senator, 1921–1933 (D)
- Chad M. Brown, member of the Louisiana House of Representatives for Iberville and Assumption parishes, effective 2016
- Henry Newton Brown, Jr., former Bossier/Webster Parish district attorney and current chief judge of Second Circuit Court of Appeal (D)
- Roy Brun, former state legislator and current district judge in Shreveport (R)
- Billy Burris, associate judge of the Louisiana Supreme Court

=== C–E ===
- Burl Cain, departing warden of the Louisiana State Penitentiary (also known as Angola)
- Bill Callegari (Class of 1963; Agricultural Engineering), member of the Texas House of Representatives from Harris County, 2001–2015; the William A. Callegari Environmental Center at LSU is named in his honor (R)
- William Derwood Cann, Jr. (1919–2010), World War II lieutenant colonel; mayor of Monroe 1978–1979 (D)
- Thomas G. Carmody (Class of 1983), state representative from Shreveport (R)
- Edward M. Carmouche (Class of 1943, 1921–1990), chairman of the Louisiana Democratic Party 1966–1968; attorney in Lake Charles
- Davy Carter, speaker of the Arkansas House of Representatives, completed LSU Banking School; attorney and banker
- Steve Carter, former LSU men's tennis coach and assistant athletic director; state representative from Baton Rouge (R)
- James Carville, chief political strategist for Bill Clinton's 1992 presidential campaign (D)
- Jack Christian, late businessman, mayor-president in East Baton Rouge Parish, 1957–1964 (D)
- Marcus R. Clark, justice of the Louisiana Supreme Court (R)
- Thomas G. Clausen, M.A. degree from LSU, Louisiana state education superintendent, 1984–1988 (D)
- George Henry Clinton (Class of 1889), member of both houses of the state legislature from Tensas Parish (D)
- John Cooksey, physician, former U.S. representative from Louisiana's 5th congressional district (R)
- Scott Crichton (Class of 1976), judge of the Louisiana 1st Judicial District Court in Shreveport since 1991 (R)
- Jay Dardenne, Louisiana lieutenant governor; former secretary of state and state senator (R)
- George W. D'Artois, public safety commissioner in Shreveport 1962–1976 (D)
- Jackson B. Davis, state senator for Caddo Parish and long-term attorney in Shreveport; obtained B.A. and M. A. degrees from LSU in 1936 and 1937, respectively
- Jimmie Davis, singer, Louisiana governor (1944–48, 1960–64), and Shreveport public service commissioner (D)
- Paula Davis, state representative for East Baton Rouge Parish since 2015
- Jay Dean, mayor of Longview, Texas, 2005–2015; incoming Republican member of the Texas House of Representatives, effective 2017; born in Opelousas in 1953
- Cleveland Dear, late U.S. representative, district attorney, and state district court judge (D)
- C. H. "Sammy" Downs (Class of 1933, master's in education), member of both houses of the Louisiana legislature from Rapides Parish and advisor to governors Earl Kemp Long and John McKeithen
- R. Harmon Drew, Sr., Law school, state representative and Minden city judge (D)
- David Duke, former state representative and U.S. Senate and gubernatorial candidate (R), white supremacist and neo-Nazi
- Mike Edmonson, superintendent of the Louisiana State Police since 2008 (R)
- Edwin Edwards, only four-term governor of Louisiana (D) and former U.S. representative for Louisiana's 7th Congressional District
- John Bel Edwards (Class of 1999), 56th governor of Louisiana 2016–2024; minority leader of the Louisiana House of Representatives 2012–2015; former member of the Louisiana House of Representatives from the 72nd district 2008–2015
- Charles Wheaton Elam (Class of 1887), lawyer and state representative from DeSoto Parish (D)
- Dale M. Erdey (Class of 1976), state senator from Livingston Parish (R)

=== F–H ===
- Maxime Faget, NASA engineering and development director
- Jimmy Field (Class of 1963), member of the Louisiana Public Service Commission, 1996–2012 (R)
- Carlos Roberto Flores, former president of Honduras
- C.B. Forgotston, late attorney, political activist, and state government watchdog (Independent)
- Murphy J. "Mike" Foster, Jr., former state senator and governor of Louisiana 1996–2004 (R)
- John B. Fournet (1895–1984), speaker of the Louisiana House, lieutenant governor, associate and chief justice of the Louisiana Supreme Court (D)
- Bobby Freeman, former state representative and Louisiana lieutenant governor (D)
- Mike Futrell (Class of 1982), former state representative and Metro Council member (R)
- Ryan Gatti (Class of 1995), state senator for District 36 since 2016; Bossier City lawyer
- Lucille May Grace (1900–1957), register of state lands and first woman in statewide office in Louisiana; first woman to run for governor (D)
- Thomas A. "Tom" Greene, B.S., M.S., D.V.M., former state senator from Iberville Parish (R)
- Anthony Guarisco, Jr., state senator from Morgan City 1976–1988; studied for Master of Arts at LSU while in his seventies, 2008–2012; lawyer and real estate businessman (D)
- Mickey Guillory, member of the Louisiana House of Representatives
- Jennifer Hale (sportscaster), Fox Sports reporter
- Kenny Havard, state representative from St. Francisville (R)
- Paul M. Hebert, civilian judge during Nuremberg War Trials
- Sharon Hewitt, member of the Louisiana State Senate from St. Tammany Parish, effective 2016

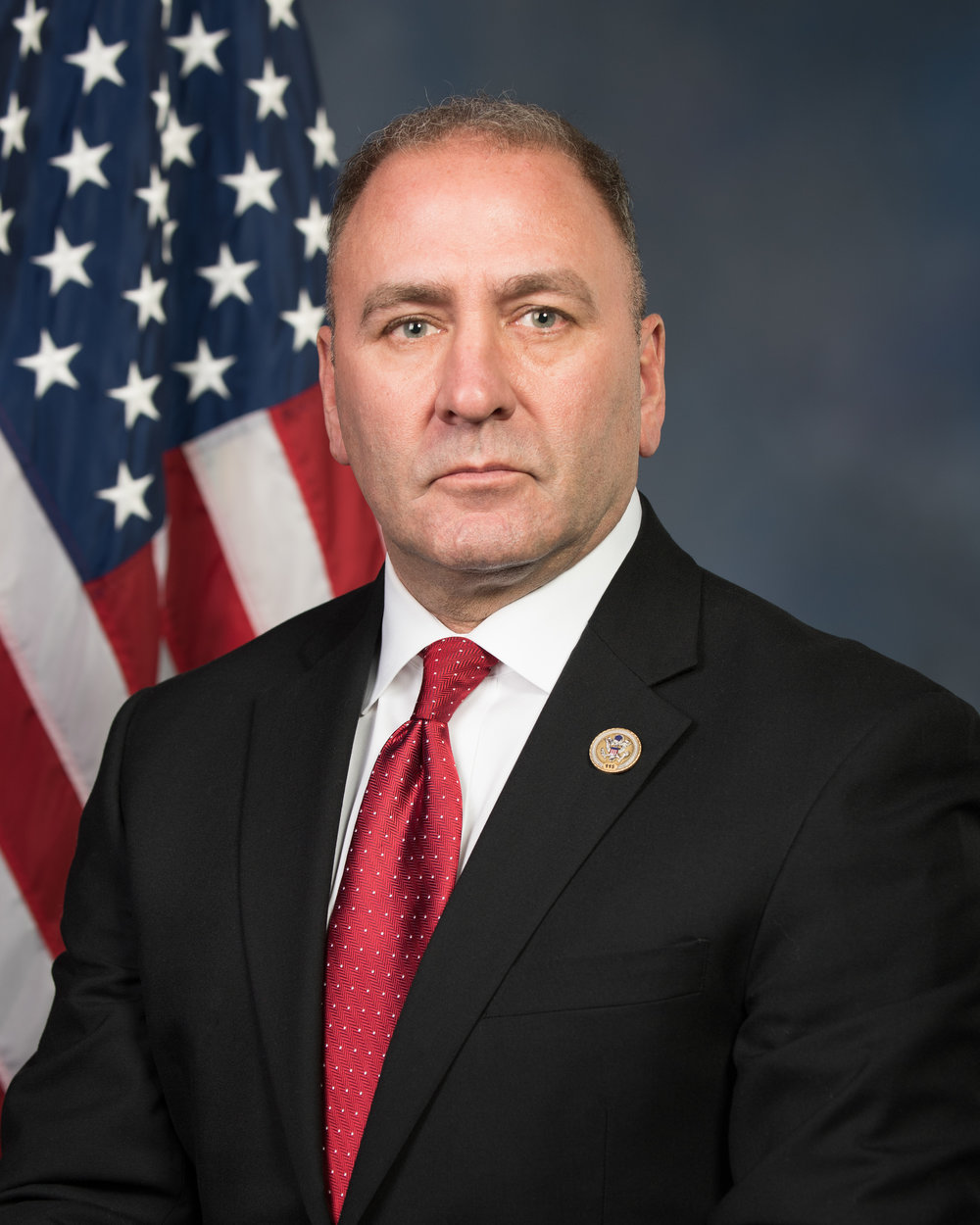
U.S. Rep. Clay Higgins

- Clay Higgins, Republican member of the United States House of Representatives for Louisiana's 3rd congressional district, beginning 2017
- Donald E. Hines (LSU-NO M.D.), Bunkie physician, former member and the president of the Louisiana State Senate 2004–2008 (D)
- J.B.E. Hittle (1951), military and intelligence historian
- Kip Holden (1974, Journalism), mayor-president of Baton Rouge (D)
- Joan Huffman, member of the Texas State Senate from Harris County since 2008; former state district court judge
- Hubert Humphrey, late 38th vice president of the United States (D)

=== I–L ===
- Blair Imani (B.A. History), African-American Muslim activist
- Barry Ivey (B.S. finance), current member of the Louisiana House of Representatives from District 65 in East Baton Rouge Parish
- Diane A. Jenkins, former Louisiana assistant attorney general and assistant district attorney for East Baton Rouge Parish (R)
- Louis E. "Woody" Jenkins, former state representative for Baton Rouge and U.S. Senate candidate, 1978, 1980, 1996; U. S. House candidate, 2008 (R)

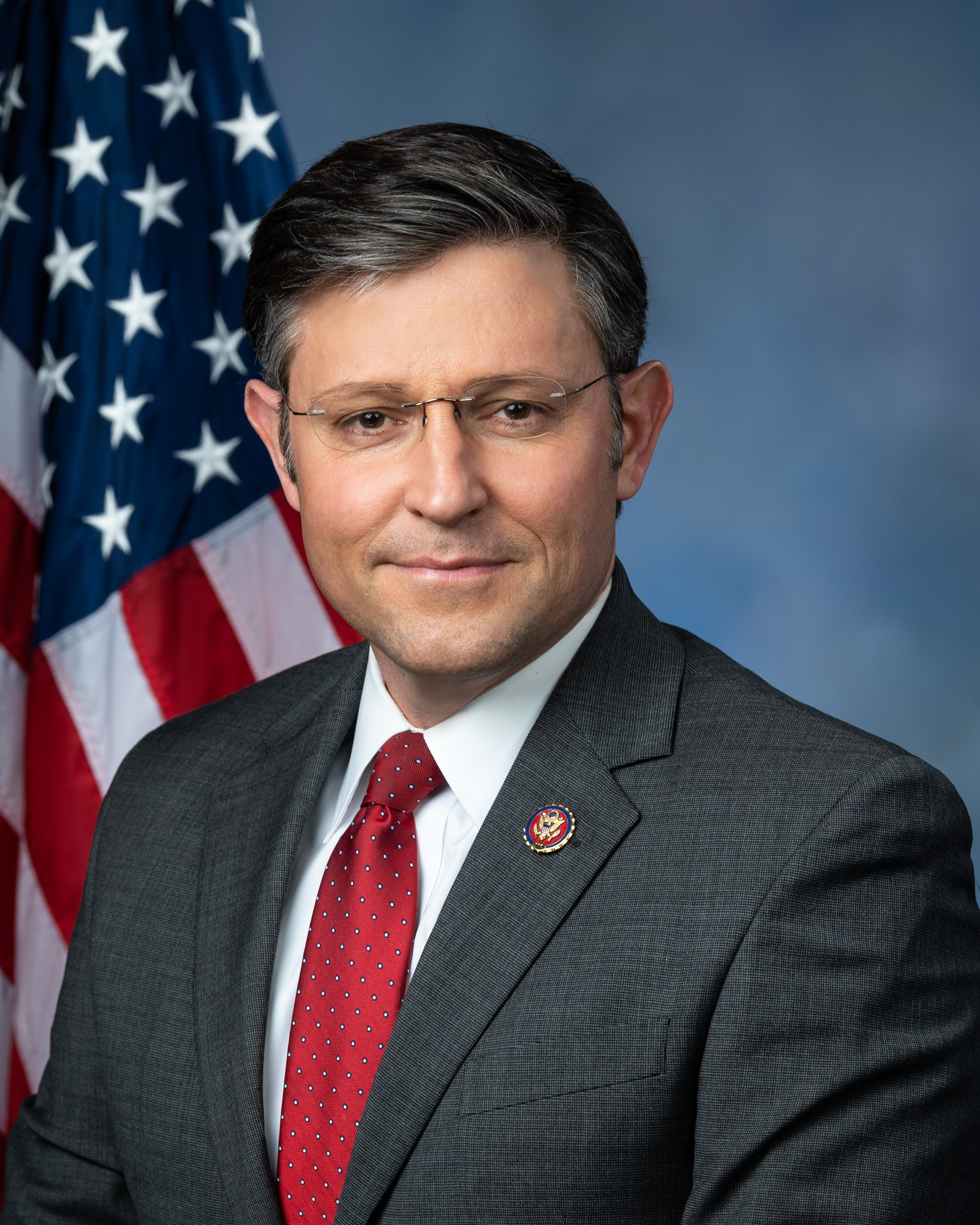
U.S. House Speaker Mike Johnson

- Mike Johnson (Bachelor of Business Administration), 56th speaker of the United States House of Representatives, member of the United States House of Representatives for Louisiana's 4th congressional district; former member of the Louisiana House of Representatives for Bossier Parish; constitutional attorney in Benton (R)
- Robert F. Kennon, late governor of Louisiana (1952–1956) (D)
- Catherine D. Kimball (Class of 1966), judge of the Louisiana 18th Judicial District Court, 1982–1992; justice of the Louisiana Supreme Court, 1993–2013
- Edith Killgore Kirkpatrick, former member of Louisiana Board of Regents; state Baptist leader (D)
- John LaBruzzo, former state representative from Jefferson Parish (R)
- Eddie J. Lambert (Class of 1978), state representative from Ascension Parish (R)
- Mary Landrieu, United States senator (D)
- Claude "Buddy" Leach, former congressman, Democratic national committeeman (D)
- Harry Lee, late Jefferson Parish sheriff (D)
- Coleman Lindsey, late state senator, lieutenant governor, state district court judge (D)
- Gillis William Long, late U.S. representative (D) from Alexandria
- Russell B. Long, late United States senator 1948–1987 (D)
- Speedy O. Long, late congressman from central Louisiana (D)

=== M–N ===
- John Maginnis, Louisiana political journalist, author, and commentator
- Sidney A. Marchand, state representative, mayor of Donaldsonville, Louisiana
- Robert M. Marionneaux, former state senator (D)
- Ray Marshall, 16th United States Secretary of Labor (D)
- Danny Martiny, state senator from Jefferson Parish (R)
- John McKeithen, late Louisiana governor, 1964–1972 (D)
- Philip H. Mecom, former US attorney for the district of Western Louisiana
- Tucker L. Melancon, United States district judge for the Western District of Louisiana since 1994 (D)
- Gregory A. Miller (Class of 1985), member of the Louisiana House of Representatives from St. Charles Parish (R)
- Newt V. Mills, U.S. representative from Louisiana's 5th congressional district 1937–1943 (D)
- Ellen Bryan Moore, Register of State Lands, third woman inducted into the LSU Hall of Distinction (D)
- Henson Moore, former U.S. representative from Louisiana's 6th district (R)
- Carlos Morales Troncoso, former vice-president of the Dominican Republic
- Doug Moreau, district attorney for East Baton Rouge Parish (1991–2009) and LSU football All-American (1964–1965) (R)
- Cecil Morgan, leader of the impeachment forces against Governor Huey Pierce Long, Jr., in 1929; later Standard Oil executive and dean of the Tulane University Law School (D)
- Jay Morris, state representative from Ouachita and Morehouse parishes (R)
- DeLesseps Morrison, Jr., late state representative from Orleans Parish (D)
- DeLesseps Story Morrison, late New Orleans mayor and ambassador to the Organization of American States (D)
- Ann McBride Norton (1944–2020), activist and executive, president of Common Cause

=== O–Q ===
- Mariano Ospina Pérez, 17th President of Colombia (1946–1950)
- Kenneth Osterberger, member of the Louisiana State Senate for East Baton Rouge Parish 1972–1992
- Abel Pacheco, former President of Costa Rica
- Darrel J. Papillion (class of 1990), judge of the U.S. District Court for the Eastern District of Louisiana 2023-
- John Victor Parker (class of 1949), judge of the U.S. District Court for the Middle District of Louisiana 1979–2014 (D)
- Mary Evelyn Parker, former Louisiana state treasurer (D)
- Barrow Peacock, state senator from Shreveport (R)
- Leander Perez, "political boss" of Plaquemines and St. Bernard parishes (D)
- Louanner Peters, former deputy governor of Illinois
- Bryan A. Poston, late state senator for Vernon Parish (D)
- Kerry Pourciau, first African-American president of the LSU Student Government Association and economic development director for Baton Rouge
- Phil Preis (class of 1972, B.S. in accounting), Baton Rouge attorney and candidate for governor in 1995 and 1999 (D)

=== R–S ===
- Melvin Rambin, 1965 M.B.A, banker in Baton Rouge and Monroe; mayor of Monroe 2000–2001 (R)
- John Rarick, attended U.S. Army program at LSU; former Sixth District (Baton Rouge-based) congressman (D turned Independent)
- Jerome "Dee" Richard, Class of 1978, current member of the Louisiana House of Representatives from Lafourche Parish, one of only two Independents in the chamber
- Charles Addison Riddle III, district attorney from Avoyelles Parish (12th Judicial District); state representative 1992–2003 (D)
- Jacques Roy, mayor of Alexandria, Louisiana (D)
- Alvin Benjamin Rubin, federal judge 1965–1991 (D)
- A. T. "Apple" Sanders, Jr., member of the Louisiana House of Representatives from East Baton Rouge Parish 1956–1964

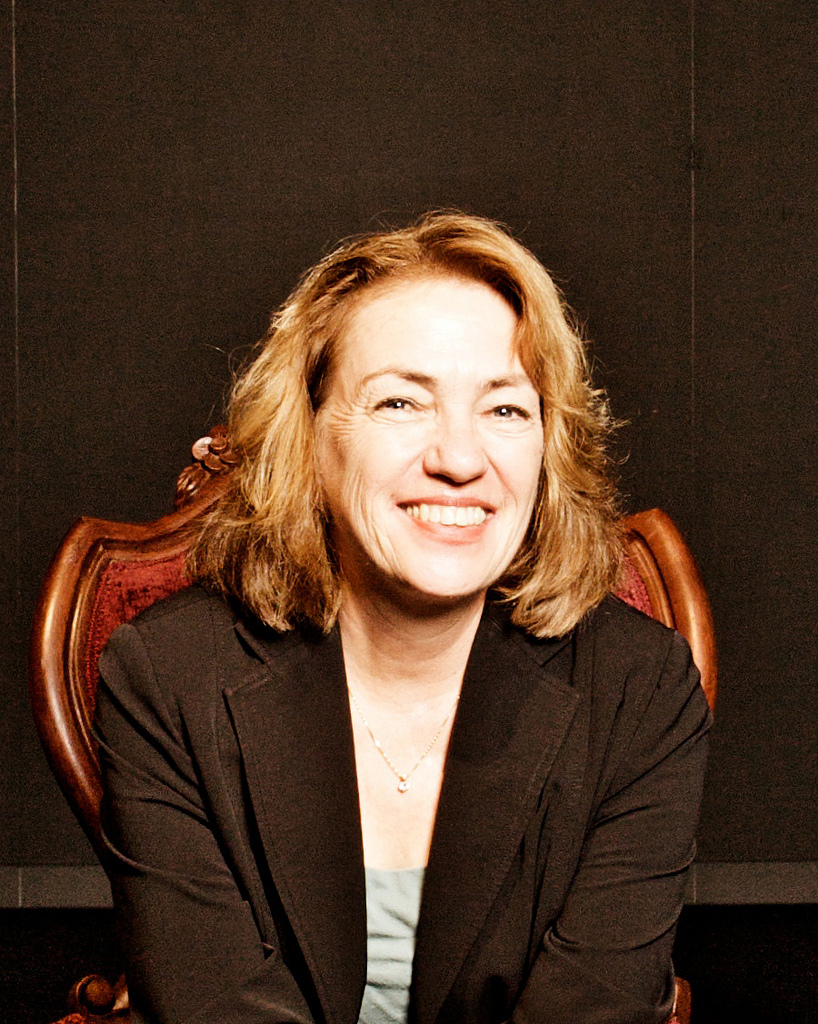
Lucy Sanders

- Lucy Sanders, CEO and co-founder of the National Center for Women & Information Technology
- Steve Scalise, U.S. representative for Louisiana's 1st congressional district (R)
- Alan Seabaugh, attorney and state representative from Caddo Parish (R)
- Henry Clay Sevier, state representative from Madison Parish, 1936–1952 (D)
- J. Minos Simon, late Lafayette attorney (D)
- Eric Skrmetta (Class of 1981), member of the Louisiana Public Service Commission (R)
- Patricia Haynes Smith (graduate studies), Democratic state representative from Baton Rouge since 2008
- Tom Stagg, U.S. District Court judge from Shreveport, former political activist (R)
- Victor T. "Vic" Stelly, former state representative from Calcasieu Parish and author of the Stelly Plan (I)
- Raymond Strother (bachelor's and master's degrees in journalism), regional and national political consultant (D)
- Glynn Sudbery, gay activist

=== T–Z ===
- Lloyd George Teekell (Class of 1948), state representative from Rapides Parish 1953–1960; judge of the 9th Judicial District Court 1979–1990 (D)
- Sam H. Theriot, former member of the Louisiana House from Vermilion Parish and former Vermilion Parish clerk of court; social studies teacher, received PhD in educational administration in 2009 (D)
- Major Thibaut (Class of 1999), state representative for District 18; businessman in New Roads
- Linda Thomas-Greenfield, United States ambassador to the United Nations under President Joe Biden; previously a diplomat in the Obama Administration
- T. Ashton Thompson, United States representative from Louisiana's 7th congressional district 1953–1965 (D)
- Donald Ellsworth Walter (Class of 1961), U.S. district judge for the United States District Court for the Western District of Louisiana, based in Shreveport, U.S. attorney for the Western District 1969–1977; native of Jennings (R)
- Rick Ward, III, state senator from District 17 since 2012 and attorney in Port Allen
- Gus Weill (Class of 1955), public relations consultant, novelist, playwright, poet (D)
- Lloyd F. Wheat (Class of 1946), attorney and state senator from Red River and Natchitoches parishes 1948–1952
- Tom Willmott, member of the Louisiana House of Representatives from Jefferson Parish since 2008 (R)

== Military ==
- Robert H. Barrow, general, 27th commandant of the Marine Corps
- George S. Bowman Jr., major general, U.S. Marine Corps; commanding general, Camp Pendleton
- Arnold W. Braswell, retired lieutenant general, U.S. Air Force, studied at LSU between 1942 and 1944
- Charles Christopher Campbell, general, U.S. Army, commander, U.S. Army Forces Command
- Claire Chennault, general, U.S. Army Air Forces, organizer and commander of the Flying Tigers
- Jefferson J. DeBlanc, World War II Marine Corps ace fighter pilot and Medal of Honor recipient
- Larry J. Dodgen, lieutenant general, former commander, U.S. Army Space and Missile Defense Command
- Terry Gabreski, lieutenant general, U.S. Air Force, BA History, 1973
- Joe S. Lawrie, U.S. Army major general
- John A. Lejeune, general, U.S. Marine Corps, namesake of Camp Lejeune, North Carolina
- Bobby V. Page, brigadier general, Deputy Chief of Chaplains of the United States Air Force
- Carey A. Randall, major general, U.S. Marine Corps; Military Assistant to the secretary of defense 1951–1960
- Ronald G. Richard, major general, commanding general of Marine Corps Base Camp Lejeune
- Jeffrey W. Talley, lieutenant general, retired, 32nd chief of Army Reserve (CAR) and 7th commanding general, United States Army Reserve Command (USARC) 2012–2016

== Science and engineering ==
- James R. Andrews, orthopedic surgeon
- Treva Brown, chemist at the United States Naval Research Laboratory
- Marc W. Buie, astronomer at Lowell Observatory
- Edgar Hull (pre-medical 1923), co-founding physician of the Medical Center of Louisiana at New Orleans (1931) and the Louisiana State University Health Sciences Center Shreveport (1969)
- George Lowery, ornithologist at LSU, founder of the LSU Museum of Natural Science
- Mary Manhein, forensic anthropologist, founding director of FACES at LSU
- Alex McCool, former manager of the Space Shuttle Projects Office at the NASA Marshall Space Flight Center in Huntsville, Alabama
- Darrell A. Posey, anthropologist and biologist
- Byron C. Sakiadis, chemical engineer
- Lawrence Simon, otolaryngologist and medical academic
- Wayne Winterrowd (1941–2010), horticulturist and author

== Sports ==
=== Football ===
- Joseph Addai, NFL RB, Indianapolis Colts
- Eric Alexander, NFL LB, New England Patriots
- Kenderick Allen, NFL DT, Green Bay Packers
- Joe Barksdale, NFL OT, Los Angeles Chargers
- Odell Beckham Jr., NFL WR, Baltimore Ravens
- Alfred Blue, RB, Houston Texans
- Billy Joe Booth, Canadian Football League (Ottawa Rough Riders) 1962–1970
- Dwayne Bowe, NFL WR, Kansas City Chiefs
- Bennie Brazell, NFL WR, Cincinnati Bengals
- Ron Brooks, NFL CB, Buffalo Bills
- Joe Burrow, NFL QB, Cincinnati Bengals
- Billy Cannon, former AFL and NFL RB/TE, Heisman Trophy winner (1959)
- Warren Capone, former World Football League and NFL linebacker
- Tommy Casanova, LSU's only 3-time All-America, Cincinnati Bengals
- Ja'Marr Chase, NFL WR, Cincinnati Bengals
- Ryan Clark, NFL FS, Pittsburgh Steelers
- Michael Clayton, NFL WR, Tampa Bay Buccaneers
- Jayden Daniels, NFL QB, Washington Commanders
- Travis Daniels, NFL CB, Miami Dolphins
- Domanick Davis, NFL RB, Houston Texans
- Glenn Dorsey, NFL DT, Kansas City Chiefs
- Alan Faneca, NFL Pro Bowl G, New York Jets
- Kevin Faulk, NFL RB, New England Patriots
- Ego Ferguson, defensive lineman, Chicago Bears
- Herman Fontenot, NFL RB, Cleveland Browns and Green Bay Packers
- Michael Ford, RB, Chicago Bears
- Eddie Fuller, National Football League player, running back with the Buffalo Bills, also played for Louisiana State University and was part of the play which became known as the "Earthquake game"
- John Garlington, NFL LB
- Randall Gay, NFL DB, New Orleans Saints
- Howard Green, NFL NT, Green Bay Packers
- Jarvis Green, NFL DE, New England Patriots
- Skyler Green, NFL WR, Dallas Cowboys
- Mark Hall, NFL DE, Green Bay Packers
- Bo Harris, linebacker in the NFL, played with the Cincinnati Bengals
- Lee Hedges, winningest high school football coach in Shreveport/Bossier City; coached 1955–1965; 1967–1984, played at LSU c. 1949–1951
- Devery Henderson, NFL WR, New Orleans Saints
- Jacob Hester, NFL RB, San Diego Chargers
- Jeremy Hill, RB, Cincinnati Bengals
- Marquise Hill, former NFL DE, New England Patriots; died in 2008 boating accident
- Trindon Holliday, NFL WR and return specialist, Oakland Raiders
- Bradie James, NFL LB, Dallas Cowboys
- Tory James, NFL CB, Cincinnati Bengals
- Josh Jasper, All-American placekicker
- Justin Jefferson, NFL WR, Minnesota Vikings
- Norman Jefferson, NFL DB, Green Bay Packers
- Anthony Johnson, defensive lineman, Miami Dolphins
- Bert Jones, former NFL Pro Bowl QB
- Chad Jones, safety, New York Giants; also played baseball for LSU as a pitcher; won NCAA Football BCS Championship and NCAA Baseball College World Series Title
- Donnie Jones, NFL P, Philadelphia Eagles
- Victor Jones, NFL RB
- Shawn Jordan, member of the 2007 National Championship team; professional mixed martial artist, formerly competing in the UFC's Heavyweight Division
- Eddie Kennison, NFL WR, Kansas City Chiefs
- E. J. Kuale, NFL/CFL DE, formerly for the Calgary Stampeders
- Brandon LaFell, NFL WR, Carolina Panthers
- David LaFleur, NFL TE, Dallas Cowboys
- Jarvis Landry, WR, Cleveland Browns
- LaRon Landry, NFL S, Washington Redskins
- Jarrett Lee, QB, free agent
- Tyrann Mathieu, NFL S, New Orleans Saints
- Kevin Mawae, NFL Pro Bowl C, Tennessee Titans
- Terry McAulay, NFL side judge (1998–2000), referee (2001–2017)
- Todd McClure, NFL C, Atlanta Falcons
- Anthony "Booger" McFarland, NFL DT, Indianapolis Colts
- Zach Mettenberger, QB, free agent
- Rudy Niswanger, NFL C, Kansas City Chiefs, Draddy Trophy winner (2005)
- Gabe Northern, NFL LB DE, Buffalo Bills, Minnesota Vikings
- Melvin Oliver, NFL DE, San Francisco 49ers
- Stephen Peterman, NFL G, Detroit Lions
- Patrick Peterson, cornerback, Arizona Cardinals
- Ronnie Prude, NFL CB, Baltimore Ravens
- Josh Reed, NFL WR, Buffalo Bills, Biletnikoff Award winner (2001)
- Mark Roman, NFL S, San Francisco 49ers
- Robert Royal, NFL TE, Buffalo Bills
- Barry Rubin (born 1957), Head Strength and Conditioning Coach of the Kansas City Chiefs in the NFL
- JaMarcus Russell, NFL QB, Oakland Raiders
- Pat Screen, drafted by Cleveland Browns, lawyer, mayor-president of East Baton Rouge Parish (1981–1988)
- Russell Shepard, WR/ST, Tampa Bay Buccaneers
- Marcus Spears, NFL DE, Dallas Cowboys
- Jerry Stovall, NFL DB, St. Louis Cardinals (1963–71) and LSU football coach (1980–83)
- Jim Taylor, former NFL Pro Bowl FB, Pro Football Hall of Fame (inducted 1976)
- Gaynell Tinsley, end, Chicago Cardinals, former LSU head coach
- Y. A. Tittle, former NFL Pro Bowl QB, Pro Football Hall of Fame (inducted 1971)
- LaBrandon Toefield, NFL RB, Jacksonville Jaguars
- Trai Turner, guard, Carolina Panthers
- Steve Van Buren, former NFL HB, Philadelphia Eagles Pro Football Hall of Fame (inducted 1965)
- Corey Webster, NFL CB, New York Giants
- Andrew Whitworth, NFL G, Cincinnati Bengals
- Kyle Williams, NFL DT, Buffalo Bills
- Brad Wing, P, New York Giants
- Claude Wroten, NFL DT, St. Louis Rams

=== Baseball ===
- Albert Belle, left fielder, Cleveland Indians
- Mike Bianco (Class of 1989), head baseball coach, Ole Miss (2001–present)
- Alex Bregman (Class of 2015), MLB All Star third baseman, Houston Astros
- Paul Byrd, MLB pitcher, Boston Red Sox
- Louis Coleman, MLB player, Kansas City Royals
- Mike Fontenot, MLB player, formerly of the Philadelphia Phillies, San Francisco Giants, and Chicago Cubs
- Jake Fraley, MLB player, Cincinnati Reds
- Eddy Furniss, 1998 Dick Howser Award recipient and member of the College Baseball Hall of Fame
- Will Harris: MLB All-Star, pitched in combined no-hitter and immaculate inning in 2019 with Houston Astros
- Brad Hawpe, MLB player, Colorado Rockies
- Aaron Hill, MLB All Star player, Toronto Blue Jays
- Bill Lee, MLB All Star player, Chicago Cubs, Philadelphia Phillies, and Boston Braves
- D. J. LeMahieu, MLB All Star player, New York Yankees
- Todd Linden, MLB player, Cleveland Indians
- Jared Mitchell, MLB player, Chicago White Sox
- Aaron Nola (Class of 2014), MLB All Star baseball pitcher, Philadelphia Phillies 2015–present
- Austin Nola, former MLB catcher, San Diego Padres 2020–2025
- Anthony Ranaudo, MLB player, Boston Red Sox
- Billy Sadler, MLB player, San Francisco Giants
- Mike Sirotka, former MLB pitcher
- Paul Skenes, MLB pitcher, Pittsburgh Pirates (2024–present)
- Brian Tallet, MLB player, Toronto Blue Jays
- Ryan Theriot, MLB player, San Francisco Giants
- Jason Vargas (born 1983), MLB player, Philadelphia Phillies
- Todd Walker, MLB player, San Diego Padres
- Brian Wilson, MLB player, San Francisco Giants
- Shane Youman, KBO player, Lotte Giants

=== Men's basketball ===
- Mahmoud Abdul-Rauf (born Chris Jackson), former NBA player
- Brandon Bass (born 1985), former NBA player, Los Angeles Lakers
- Antonio Blakeney (born 1996), NBA player for the Chicago Bulls, and in the Israeli Basketball Premier League
- Jeremy Combs (born 1995), basketball player for Israeli team Hapoel Ramat Gan Givatayim
- Glen Davis (born 1986), former NBA player
- Ronald Dupree (born 1981), former NBA player, Indiana Pacers
- Tari Eason, NBA player, Houston Rockets
- Al Green, NBL Hall of Famer, MVP for Adelaide 36ers
- Justin Hamilton (born 1990), former NBA player, Miami Heat
- Anthony Hickey (born 1992), basketball player for Hapoel Haifa in the Israeli Basketball Premier League
- Bobby Lowther (1923–2015), only two-sport All-American (basketball and track and field) at LSU (1946)
- "Pistol" Pete Maravich, member of the Basketball Hall of Fame and one of the NBA's 50 Greatest Players
- Jarell Martin (born 1994), basketball player for Maccabi Tel Aviv of the Israeli Basketball Premier League
- Don Newman, NBA and college basketball coach; former NBA player
- Shaquille O'Neal, former NBA star; one of the NBA's 50 Greatest Players
- Bob Pettit, member of the Basketball Hall of Fame and one of the NBA's 50 Greatest Players
- Anthony Randolph, former NBA player, Minnesota Timberwolves
- Jerry Reynolds, former NBA player
- Stanley Roberts, former NBA player
- Ben Simmons (born 1996), Australian No. 1 overall pick in the 2016 NBA draft, NBA player for the Philadelphia 76ers (2016–2022) Brooklyn Nets (2022–2025) Los Angeles Clippers (2025), currently for the Sacramento Kings
- Willie Sims (born 1958), American-Israeli basketball player
- Stromile Swift, former NBA player, Phoenix Suns
- Tyrus Thomas, former NBA player, Charlotte Bobcats
- Marcus Thornton, former NBA player, Houston Rockets

=== Women's basketball ===
- Seimone Augustus, WNBA player, Minnesota Lynx
- Dana "Pokey" Chatman, former head coach of the Lady Tigers basketball team
- Sylvia Fowles, WNBA player and SEC player of the year
- Temeka Johnson, WNBA player, Los Angeles Sparks
- Angel Reese, WNBA player, Chicago Sky

=== Golf ===
- Brian Bateman, professional golfer, winner of 2007 Buick Open
- Sam Burns, professional golfer, winner of four PGA Tour events as of August 2022
- Smylie Kaufman, professional golfer, winner of 2016 Shriners Hospitals for Children Open
- Jenny Lidback, professional LPGA golfer, winner of 1985 du Maurier Ltd. Classic
- Johnny Pott, professional golfer, five-time winner on PGA tour, 1955 NCAA championship team
- David Toms, professional golfer, winner of 2001 PGA Championship

=== Gymnastics ===
- Olivia Dunne, former LSU gymnast and leading figure in college sports endorsements 2021–2025
- Yohanan Moyal (born 1965), Israeli Olympic gymnast
- Kristie Phillips, former U.S. National Gymnastics Champion

=== Cheerleading and dance ===
- Dylon Hoffpauir, former LSU cheerleader, Saints Cheer Krewe member, and head cheer and dance coach at Loyola University New Orleans

=== Women's soccer ===
- Wasila Diwura-Soale (born 1996), Ghanaian international soccer player

=== Track and field ===
- Lolo Jones, 2008 and 2012 Olympic hurdler, track and field
- Armand Duplantis, pole vaulter, Olympic and 2-time world champion (world record holder at 6.26 m)
- Sha'Carri Richardson, sprinter, 2023 World Champion in 100 m

=== Wrestling ===
- Kevin Jackson, 3x All-American Tiger wrestler, 1992 Olympic Freestyle Wrestling Champion, current head coach for Iowa State University's ISU Cyclone Wrestling
- John Tenta, professional wrestler in the World Wrestling Federation (Earthquake)

=== Mixed martial arts ===
- Pat Barry (attended), retired professional mixed martial arts (MMA) fighter
- Sam Hoger, appeared on the first season of The Ultimate Fighter; retired professional mixed martial arts (MMA) fighter
