= Margaret H. Christ =

American accounting professor

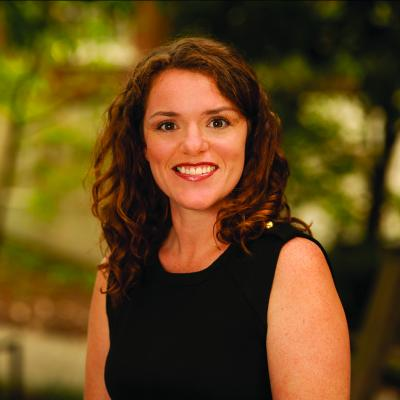
- Born: March 10, 1978 (age 48); United States
- Education: Louisiana State University and University of Texas at Austin
- Occupations: Accountant, faculty member
- Known for: J.M. Tull Chair in Accounting at the J.M. Tull School of Accounting

Margaret H. Christ (born March 10, 1978) is an American academic accountant and author who is the J.M. Tull Chair in Accounting and Director of the J.M. Tull School of Accounting at the Terry College of Business at the University of Georgia. She wrote the book Cost Accounting: A Data Analytics Approach.

== Early life and education ==
Christ received a BS in accounting from Louisiana State University in 1999. She has a PhD in accounting from the University of Texas at Austin which she received in 2008.

== Career ==
Christ worked as a risk consultant at Arthur Andersen LLP and Protiviti between her undergraduate and graduate degrees. She was a research and teaching assistant at UT Austin while working towards her PhD. After graduating from the University of Texas, Christ got a job at the University of Georgia as an assistant professor at the J.M. Tull School of Accounting. She became the director of the school in 2024.

Christ's work focuses on accounting analytics which specifically look at data analytics and data visualization techniques as they are used across all accounting domains. She wants students to be able to "thrive in a technology-driven profession."

Her work has been published in The Accounting Review, Contemporary Accounting Research, Accounting, Organizations and Society, and Auditing: A Journal of Practice & Theory. In 2026 she became one of the editors of The Accounting Review. She serves on the American Accounting Association's COSO Committee where she contributed to the COSO Internal Control Integrated Framework.

== Selected publications ==
- Christ, Margaret H.; Holderness, D. Kip; Richardson, Vernon J. (2024). Cost Accounting: A Data Analytics Approach. New York, NY: McGraw Hill. ISBN 9781266654015.
- Austin, Ashley A.; Carpenter, Tina D.; Christ, Margaret H.; Nielson, Christy S. (2025). "Empowering Auditors to Pursue Fraud during Evidence Evaluation". Accounting Horizons. 39 (2): 7–18. doi:10.2308/HORIZONS-2023-187.
- Christ, Margaret H.; Eulerich, Marc; Krane, Ronja; Wood, David A. (2021). "New Frontiers for Internal Audit Research". Accounting Perspectives. 20 (4): 449–475. doi:10.1111/1911-3838.12272.
- Austin, Ashley A.; Carpenter, Tina D.; Christ, Margaret H.; Nielson, Christy S. (2021). "The Data Analytics Journey: Interactions Among Auditors, Managers, Regulation, and Technology". Contemporary Accounting Research. 38 (3): 1888–1924. doi:10.1111/1911-3846.12680.
- Christ, Margaret H. (2013). "An Experimental Investigation of the Interactions Among Intentions, Reciprocity, and Control". Journal of Management Accounting Research. 25 (1): 169–197. doi:10.2308/jmar-50443.
- Christ, Margaret H.; Emett, Scott A.; Summers, Scott L.; Wood, David A. (2012). "The Effects of Preventive and Detective Controls on Employee Performance and Motivation". Contemporary Accounting Research. 29 (2): 432–452. doi:10.1111/j.1911-3846.2011.01106.x.

== Honors and awards ==
- Accounting Horizons Best Paper Award from the American Accounting Association (2013)
- Innovation in Accounting Education Award from the American Accounting Association (2020)
- Deloitte Foundation Wildman Medal from the American Accounting Association (2025)
