= Will Harris (baseball) =

American baseball player (born 1984)

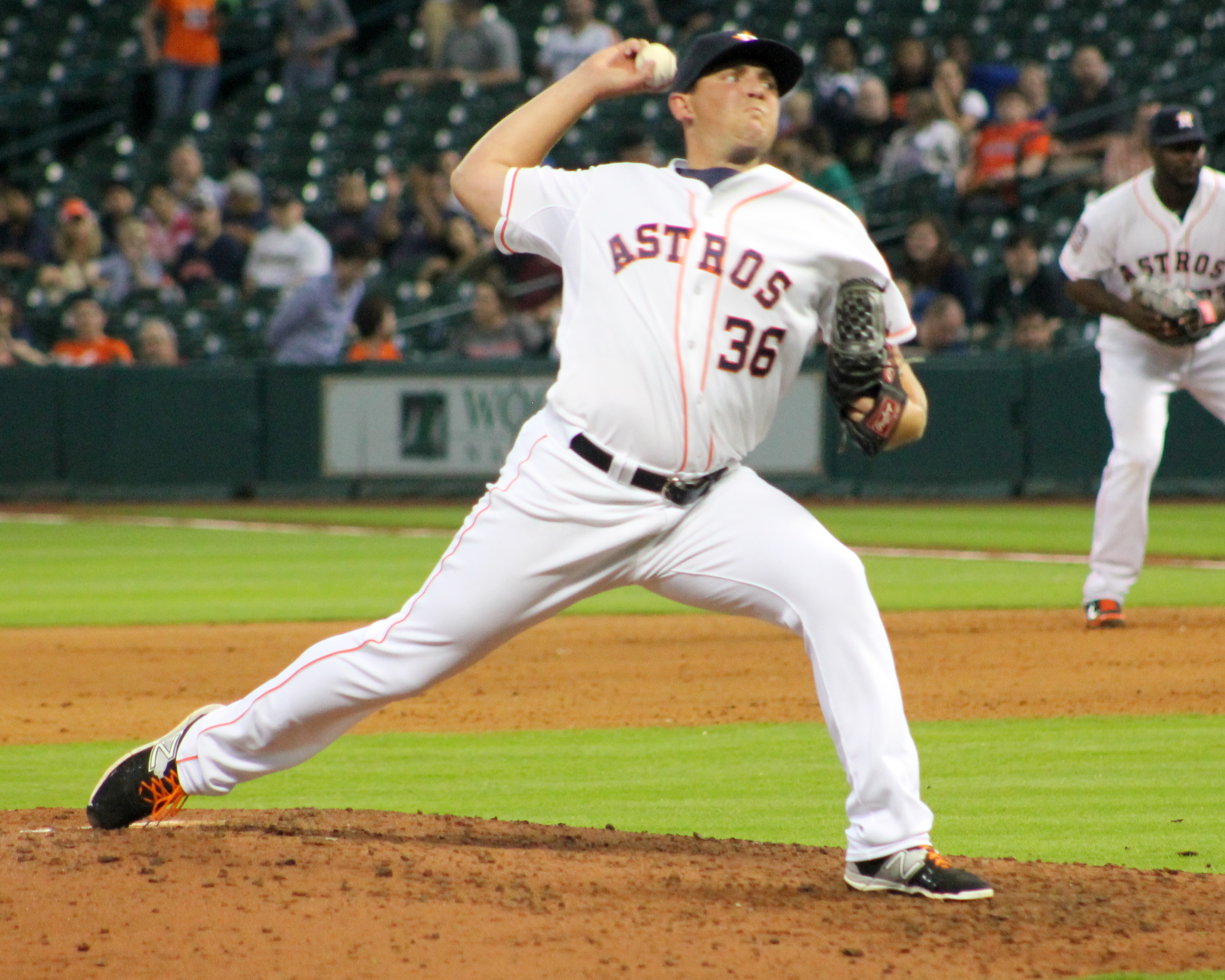
- Harris with the Houston Astros in 2015
- Pitcher
- Born: August 28, 1984 (age 42); Houston, Texas, U.S.
- Batted: Right Threw: Right

MLB debut
- August 13, 2012, for the Colorado Rockies

Last MLB appearance
- May 22, 2021, for the Washington Nationals

MLB statistics
- Win–loss record: 23–20
- Earned run average: 2.94
- Strikeouts: 452
- Stats at Baseball Reference

Teams
- Colorado Rockies (2012); Arizona Diamondbacks (2013–2014); Houston Astros (2015–2019); Washington Nationals (2020–2021)

Career highlights and awards
- All-Star (2016); World Series champion (2017); Pitched a combined no-hitter on August 3, 2019

William Taylor Harris (born August 28, 1984) is an American former professional baseball pitcher. He played in Major League Baseball (MLB) for the Colorado Rockies, Arizona Diamondbacks, Houston Astros and Washington Nationals. He made his major league debut in 2012.

From Houston, Texas, Harris played college baseball for Louisiana State University (LSU). The Rockies selected him in the ninth round of the 2006 MLB draft.

As a member of the Astros, Harris was named an American League All-Star in 2016, won the 2017 World Series, and, in 2019, pitched in a combined no-hitter and an immaculate inning.

== Early life ==
Harris played baseball at Slidell High School in Slidell, Louisiana. He attended Louisiana State University (LSU) and played collegiate baseball for LSU Tigers. In 2004, he played collegiate summer baseball in the Cape Cod Baseball League for the Yarmouth-Dennis Red Sox.

== Professional career ==
=== Colorado Rockies ===
The Colorado Rockies selected Harris in the ninth round of the 2006 Major League Baseball draft. Harris made his professional debut with the Low-A Tri-City Dust Devils. In 2007, Harris played for the Single-A Asheville Tourists, recording a stellar 1.32 ERA in 38 appearances. The next year he played for the High-A Modesto Nuts, posting a 2.77 ERA in 49 games for the team. He only appeared in 1 game in 2009, for Tri-City, and did not play at all in 2010. In 2011, Harris returned to Modesto, registering a3-2 record and 5.55 ERA in 33 appearances. To begin the 2012 season, Harris split the year between the Double-A Tulsa Drillers and the Triple-A Colorado Springs Sky Sox, posting a 1.02 ERA in Colorado Springs and a 2.62 ERA in Tulsa.

Harris was promoted to the majors for the first time on August 11, 2012. He made his major league debut the next day, allowing 3 earned runs in 1.0 inning of work against the Milwaukee Brewers. He finished his rookie season with an unsightly 8.15 ERA across 20 appearances. On March 29, 2013, Harris was designated for assignment by the Rockies.

=== Arizona Diamondbacks ===
On April 3, 2013, Harris was claimed off waivers by the Oakland Athletics. The Arizona Diamondbacks claimed Harris off waivers from the Athletics three days later. In 61 appearances for Arizona in 2013, Harris recorded a 2.91 ERA with 53 strikeouts in 52.2 innings of work. The next year, Harris split the year between the Triple-A Reno Aces and Arizona, posting a superb 0.99 ERA in Reno, but a less sightly 4.34 ERA in 29 appearances for the big league club.

=== Houston Astros ===
On November 3, 2014, Harris was claimed off waivers by the Houston Astros. Harris appeared in 68 games in 2015, pitching to a 5–5 record and 1.90 ERA with 68 strikeouts. Harris was invited to his first MLB All-Star Game in 2016, and finished that season with an ERA of 2.25 in 66 appearances and 12 saves.

The following season, Harris was limited to 46 games during the regular season due to injury, posting a 2.98 ERA. He appeared in six games in the 2017 postseason. In a combined total of four innings, he allowed six hits and one run. The Astros won the 2017 World Series, the first-ever World Series victory for the franchise, and World Series championship earned for Harris as well.

In 2018, Harris pitched in 61 games, going 5–3 with an ERA of 3.49. On August 3, 2019, Harris worked in relief in a combined no-hitter of the Seattle Mariners. The final score was 9–0. Harris pitched an immaculate inning in relief in the eighth inning versus the Los Angeles Angels on September 27, 2019. During the 2019 regular season, he was 4–1 with four saves and a 1.50 ERA; over 68 relief appearances, he pitched 60 innings and struck out 62 batters. He set two single-season relief pitching franchise records in 2019—for ERA, and for inherited runners strand rate (97.7%). Harris was the BBWAA's Houston chapter winner of the Darryl Kile Good Guy Award. He started the playoffs with consecutive scoreless outings, collecting six holds. In Game 3 of the World Series, Harris entered the bottom of the sixth inning versus the Washington Nationals with one out and two runners aboard. He proceeded to strand both runners and retire the side the following inning for a season-high five outs recorded on the way to a 4–1 Astros win. However, in Games 6 and 7, he surrendered a run in each contest, including the go-ahead home run to Howie Kendrick in Game 7 as the Nationals prevailed and won the World Series. Harris made 12 total appearances in the playoffs, going 0–1 with a 1.86 ERA. He became a free agent following the season.

=== Washington Nationals ===
On January 3, 2020, the Washington Nationals announced they had signed Harris to a three-year guaranteed contract reportedly worth $24 million. Harris could not replicate his 2019 success with Houston in 2020, but still had a solid season with Washington, registering a 3.06 ERA with 21 strikeouts in 17 2/3 innings of work.

On May 30, 2021, it was announced that Harris would undergo surgery to address thoracic outlet syndrome, likely ending his 2021 season. He was placed on the 60-day injured list on June 12. In eight games for the Nationals, Harris struggled to a 9.00 ERA.

Harris ran into a setback in his recovery from thoracic outlet syndrome during Spring Training in 2022 and was shut down. Another surgery was required to remove scar tissue that had built up in his arm. On March 31, 2022, Harris officially underwent right pectoral surgery. He was placed on the 60-day injured list to begin the season on April 7, he ended up missing the entire season. He became a free agent following the season.

=== Retirement ===
On February 10, 2023, Harris' wife, Caroline, posted a video on Instagram mentioning that he had retired from baseball after nearly a decade in MLB.

== Scouting report ==
Harris threw three pitches — a four-seam fastball in the mid 90s, a cutter in the low 90's, and a curveball in the upper 70s.

== Personal life ==
Harris has one older brother, Clay, and one younger brother, Dylan. Clay was an infielder at LSU from 2002 through 2005, and played in the Philadelphia Phillies' minor league system.

Harris and his wife Caroline have a son and a daughter and reside in Baton Rouge, Louisiana.

== See also ==
- Houston Astros award winners and league leaders
- List of Houston Astros no-hitters
- List of Louisiana State University alumni
- List of Major League Baseball no-hitters
- List of Major League Baseball pitchers who have thrown an immaculate inning
- List of people from Houston

Awards and achievements
Preceded by Taylor Cole, Félix Peña	No-hit game August 3, 2019 (with Sanchez, Biagini & Devenski)	Succeeded by Justin Verlander
