= Congregation Albert =

Reform synagogue in Albuquerque, New Mexico, US

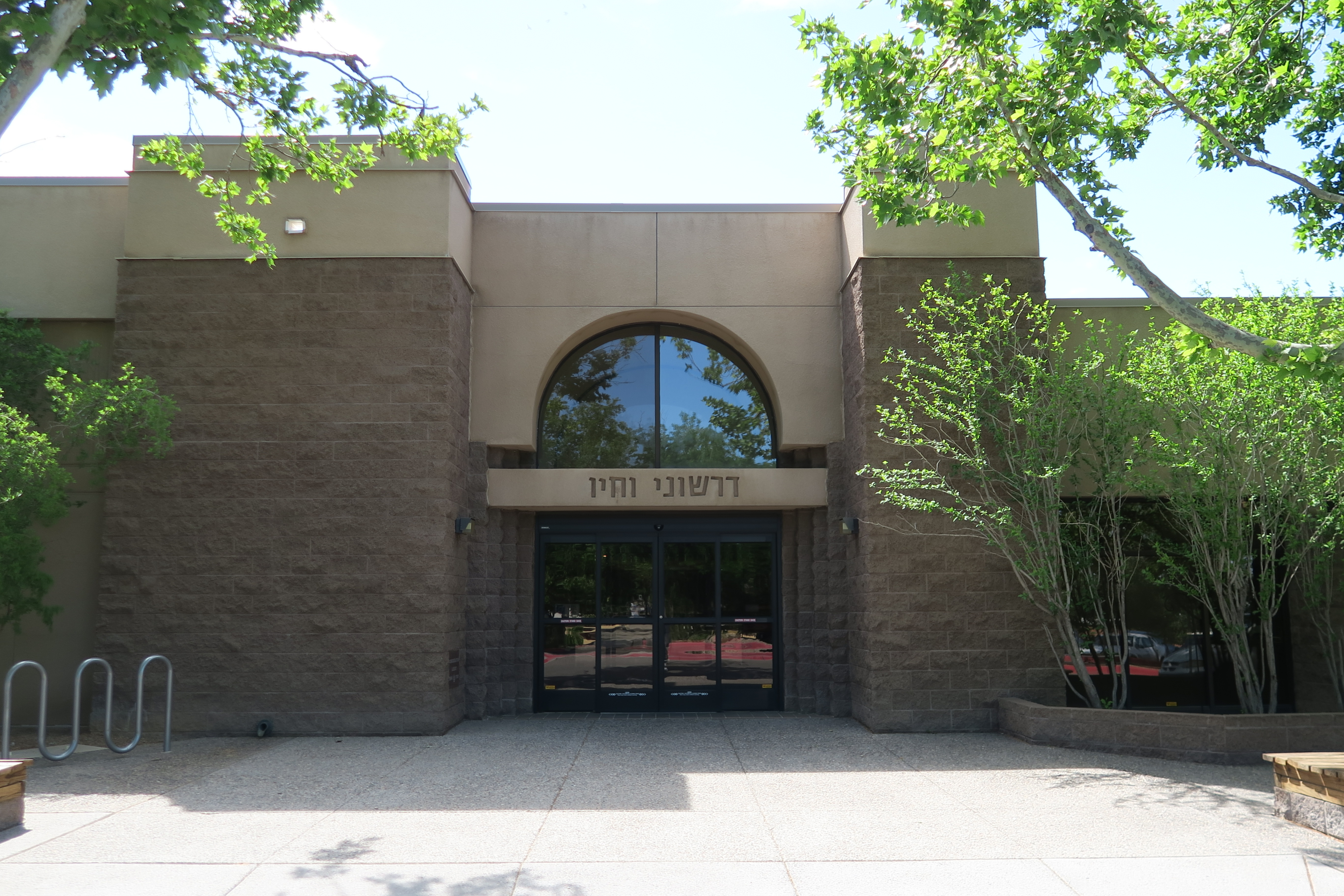
- Congregation Albert

- Location in New Mexico

Religion
- Affiliation: Reform Judaism
- Ecclesiastical or organizational status: Synagogue
- Leadership: Rabbi Celia Surget
- Status: Active

Location
- Location: 3800 Louisiana Boulevard NE, Albuquerque, New Mexico
- Country: United States
- Interactive map of Congregation Albert
- Coordinates: 35°7′41″N 106°34′3″W

Architecture
- Founder: Alfred Grunsfeld; Henry N. Jaffa; Berthold Spitz
- Established: 1897 (as a congregation)
- Completed: 1900 (West Gold Avenue); 1951 (Lead Street); 1984 (Louisiana Boulevard)

Website
- congregationalbert.org

Congregation Albert is a Reform Jewish synagogue located at 3800 Louisiana Boulevard Northeast in Albuquerque, New Mexico in the United States. Established in 1897, the congregation is the oldest Jewish organization of continued existence in the state.

== History ==
=== Formation and early years ===
Congregation Albert was established as a congregation in 1897. It was established by Alfred Grunsfeld (its first treasurer), Henry N. Jaffa (its first president and the first Mayor of Albuquerque), and Berthold Spitz (the city's Postmaster for 12 years), after discussions with 70 members of the first congregation in Albuquerque, the B’nai Brith Lodge No. 336, which had been formed in 1883.

The naming rights of the new synagogue were auctioned off. In 1897, the Grunsfeld family, winning the auction for $250 ($9,700 in current dollar terms), elected to name the synagogue after Alfred’s deceased father, Albert Grunsfeld, who had immigrated to Santa Fe, from Germany in the 1870s.

At the outset, the synagogue had 34 members and its religious services were held at the Knights of Pythias Hall on Gold Avenue in downtown Albuquerque. Half a year later, the synagogue moved to the Jolly Ten Hall located on Gold Avenue.

Congregation Albert advertised for a rabbi in The American Israelite. Its first Rabbi was Dr. William H. Greenburg of London, England, who served from 1898 to 1900 and held his first service for 50 members on March 18, 1898. Greenburg served in his initial two-year term for a salary of $125 per month ($4,800 in current dollar terms).

After its cornerstone was set on September 3, 1899, in April 1900 Congregation Albert's first building was dedicated on West Gold Avenue (at the northeast corner of its intersection with 7th Street), with an onion-shaped oriental dome, pitched roof, and twin staircases leading to a second-story entrance, and Rabbi Pizer Jacobs was installed as the second rabbi of the synagogue. In 1902, Jacob H. Kaplan became the Rabbi. Methodists were allowed to use the synagogue until their church was built in 1904. In 1919, the synagogue had 84 members and, after a dip during the Depression, in 1944 it had 87 members.

Rabbi David D. Shor served the congregation from 1948 to 1978, during which time he was tendered a lifetime contract in 1956. In 1951, Congregation Albert moved to a building on Lead, between Oak and Mulberry SE.

=== Recent history ===
At the time of the synagogue's 75th anniversary, a 600-copy limited edition Diamond Jubilee History entitled Congregation Albert, 1897–1972 by Professor Gunther Rothenberg, a University of New Mexico professor of European history and Jewish history, was printed. In 1975, the synagogue elected a woman president, Ethel Cahn.

The synagogue was led by Rabbi Paul J. Citrin from 1978 to 1996. In 1984, Congregation Albert moved to its current location, at 3800 Louisiana Boulevard NE, just south of Montgomery.

The synagogue was led by Rabbi Joseph R. Black from 1996 to 2010. In 2000, out of 606 working members, 14% were doctors and 9% were attorneys. In 2005, it had more than 700 members.

Cantor Barbara R. Finn served as Cantor from 2004 to 2024; she became Cantor Emerita in July 2024.

Rabbi Harry L. Rosenfeld led Congregation Albert from 2011 to 2021, and currently serves as Rabbi Emeritus.

Rabbi Celia Surget has served as Congregation Albert's Rabbi since July 1, 2021.

The synagogue is a member of the Union for Reform Judaism, having joined in 1921.

== Notable members ==
- Alex Bregman, a professional Major League Baseball player with the Boston Red Sox
