= Alex Bregman =

American baseball player (born 1994)

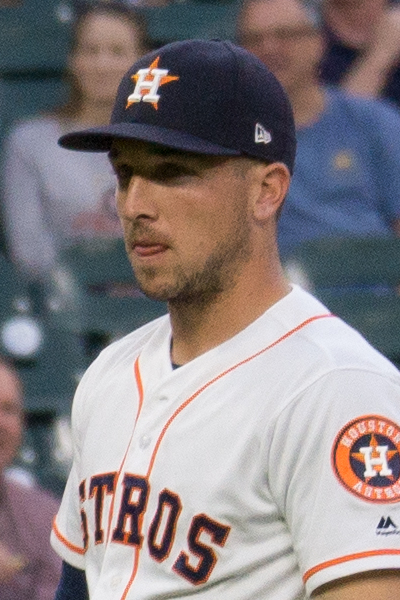
- Bregman with the Houston Astros in 2018

Chicago Cubs – No. 3
- Third baseman
- Born: March 30, 1994 (age 32); Albuquerque, New Mexico, U.S.
- Bats: Right Throws: Right

MLB debut
- July 25, 2016, for the Houston Astros

MLB statistics (through 2026 season)
- Batting average: .271
- Hits: 1,411
- Home runs: 237
- Runs batted in: 818
- Stats at Baseball Reference

Teams
- Houston Astros (2016–2024); Boston Red Sox (2025); Chicago Cubs (2026–present)

Career highlights and awards
- 3× All-Star (2018, 2019, 2025); 2× World Series champion (2017, 2022); 2× Gold Glove Award (2024, 2026); 2× Silver Slugger Award (2019, 2026)
Medals
Men's baseball
Representing United States
World Baseball Classic
Gold medal – first place	2017 Los Angeles	Team
Silver medal – second place	2026 Miami	Team

Alexander David Bregman (born March 30, 1994) is an American professional baseball third baseman for the Chicago Cubs of Major League Baseball (MLB). He has previously played in MLB for the Houston Astros and Boston Red Sox.

As a high school sophomore at Albuquerque Academy in 2010, Bregman became the first high school player to win the USA Baseball Player of the Year Award. As a junior the following year he batted .678 while setting a New Mexico season record with 19 home runs. In three years of college baseball for Louisiana State University (LSU), Bregman was voted the 2013 National Freshman of the Year by Baseball America, won the 2013 Brooks Wallace Award as the country's best college shortstop, and was a two-time All-American. Toward the end of his junior year of college, he was selected by the Houston Astros with the second pick in the first round of the 2015 MLB draft.

Bregman made his MLB debut in 2016. He started 2017 as the youngest member of Team USA, which won the gold medal in the 2017 World Baseball Classic, and he ended the season winning the 2017 World Series with the Astros. He was named MVP of the 2018 MLB All-Star Game and led the American League in doubles in 2018. In 2019 he was again an All Star, led the AL in walks and WAR, and received the 2019 American League Silver Slugger Award at third base. In 2022, he won his second World Series. Bregman won his first Gold Glove in 2024. As of 2024, he is the all-time leader in multiple postseason records for a third baseman, including home runs, runs batted in, runs scored, putouts, and assists.

== Early life ==
Bregman was born in Albuquerque, New Mexico, and raised in the Northeast Heights section. He is Jewish and was a member of Albuquerque's Congregation Albert growing up. At age 13, in his Bar Mitzvah speech he said: "I want to be a professional athlete who plays for the love of the game, never quits trying to give my best, and is a good role model for all of the kids who look up to baseball players."

His father, Samuel Bregman, and his mother, Jackie Bregman (née De Oliveira), met in law school and are both lawyers. Sam Bregman also served as the chair of the Democratic Party of New Mexico. He has two younger siblings, Jessica and Anthony (A.J.); his brother A.J. is also a baseball player, and was selected by the Astros in the 35th round of the 2018 MLB draft. His father played baseball as a freshman for the University of New Mexico Lobos in 1982, a team for which his uncle Ben Bregman also played; they both originally moved to Albuquerque to play baseball for the college on baseball scholarships. His father was also a part owner, starting in 2006, of the NBA Development League’s New Mexico Thunderbirds. His father is currently the District Attorney of Bernalillo County, New Mexico. His father is Jewish, while his mother converted to Judaism from Catholicism.

His paternal grandfather, Stan Bregman, was the son of Russian-Jewish immigrants. His grandfather was general counsel for the Washington Senators from the late 1960s until the team moved to Texas in 1971 in a sale that he negotiated, and he helped the club sign Hall of Famer Ted Williams as the team's general manager. His grandfather saw all of his games in high school. His great-grandfather Samuel "Bo" Bregman immigrated from Russia to Washington, D.C., around 1900 at age 11 to escape Russian anti-Jewish pogroms, and ultimately married Sadie Hurwitz. He promoted boxing cards that featured, among others, Joe Louis, Billy Conn, and Bob Foster. He was also part of the ownership group with George Preston Marshall that moved the Boston Redskins to Washington, D.C., to become the Washington Redskins.

Bregman began playing tee-ball at age four. In his first game, he turned an unassisted triple play by catching a line drive, tagging a runner, and then stepping on second base. He was a batboy for the University of New Mexico baseball team, and in 2004 served as a batboy for a game against Arizona State University and his then-favorite baseball player, Dustin Pedroia. His best friend is Blake Swihart, who played for the Boston Red Sox and Arizona Diamondbacks. Bregman and Swihart played travel ball together growing up.

== High school career ==
Bregman attended Albuquerque Academy. He primarily played catcher. In 2009, Bregman led his high school team to a state championship as a freshman shortstop. He batted leadoff, hitting for an average of .514 with three home runs, including one during the championship game that left Isotopes Park, the Dodgers' Class AAA team park. At the October 2010 COPABE Pan American Baseball Championships in Lagos de Mareno, Mexico, while he was a sophomore, he batted .564 for the gold-medal-winning 16-and-under USA National Team, and was named the MVP. That year, at the age of 16, he became the first high school player to win the USA Baseball Richard W. "Dick" Case Player of the Year Award.

In 2011, Bregman batted .678 as a junior in high school and established a season record in New Mexico with 19 home runs. Bregman was named first team All-State, and received All-Metro and All-District honors. In the fall of that year he led the 18-and-under U.S. National Team to a gold medal at the International Baseball Federation World Championships.

Bregman was originally projected to be a first-round draft pick out of high school. That changed, however, when he shattered the second knuckle on his right (throwing) hand in the fifth game of his high school senior season while using his bare hand to deflect a bad hop on a ground ball. The injury made him miss most of his senior season. He was drafted by the Boston Red Sox in the 29th round of the 2012 Major League Baseball draft as a second baseman, after he made clear that he would not sign with any team unless it picked him in the first round. He elected not to sign with the Red Sox. Instead, he chose to attend LSU.

== College career ==
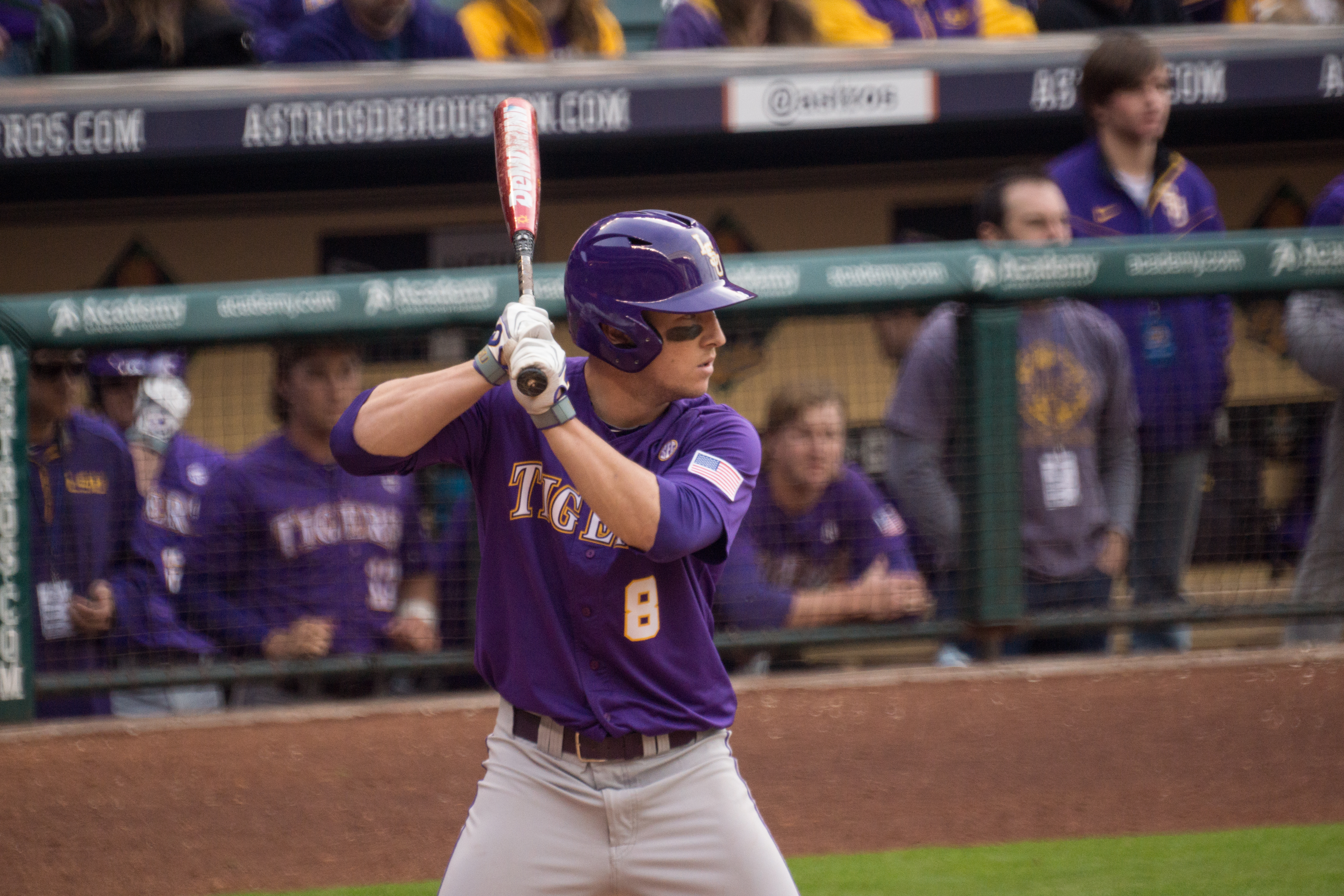
Bregman playing for LSU at Minute Maid Park in 2015

At LSU, Bregman majored in sports administration. He also played shortstop for the LSU Tigers baseball team in the Southeastern Conference (SEC). He wore number 30 as a freshman, reflecting the 30 teams that had passed on him in the first round of the 2012 draft.

In 2013, he batted .369 (fifth in the SEC)/.417/.546 (sixth) with 104 hits (second in the nation) in 282 at bats, with 18 doubles (third in the SEC), seven triples (leading the SEC), six homers, 52 RBIs (5th in the SEC), 59 runs (4th in the SEC), and 16 steals (8th in the SEC) in 17 attempts, and had a 23-game hitting streak. Bregman won the 2013 Brooks Wallace Award as the country's best college shortstop. He was also voted first-team All-American by Baseball America, the American Baseball Coaches Association (ABCA), Perfect Game, and the Jewish Sports Review. In addition, he was named the 2013 National Freshman of the Year by Baseball America, Collegiate Baseball, and the National Collegiate Baseball Writers Association (NCBWA), and was voted 2013 SEC Freshman of the Year and first-team all-SEC by the league coaches. Moreover, he was named 2013 ABCA First-Team All-South Region, National Collegiate Athletic Association (NCAA) Baton Rouge Regional Most Outstanding Player, Louisiana Freshman of the Year, and SEC Player of the Week (March 25, 2013), and named to the 2013 USA Collegiate National Team (for which he batted .361).

In 2014, he batted .316/.397/.455 with 16 doubles, six home runs, 35 runs, and 12 stolen bases in 244 at bats. Bregman was voted 2014 second-team all-SEC, NCAA Regional All-Tournament Team, SEC All-Tournament Team, Second-Team All-Louisiana, and named to the 2014 USA Collegiate National Team. He shared an apartment that season with his LSU teammate and future fellow MLB All Star, pitcher Aaron Nola.

In 2015, Bregman batted .312/.406/.534 with 59 runs (8th in the SEC), 22 doubles (tops in the SEC), nine home runs, 49 RBIs, seven sacrifice flies (2nd), 38 stolen bases (leading the SEC, and the second-most steals in a season in LSU history), and 206 assists (leading the conference), led the nation's top-ranked baseball team to the College World Series, and won LSU's Skip Bertman Award, which goes to the player who best exemplifies the spirit of the LSU Baseball program. He was also voted the Rawlings Gold Glove winner at shortstop by the ABCA, and voted first-team All-American by both Baseball America and the NCBWA for the second time, First Team D1Baseball, First Team Perfect Game, and Second Team Collegiate Baseball.

He was one of four finalists for the 2015 Golden Spikes Award, presented annually to the nation's top college player and won by outfielder Andrew Benintendi. Also, he was a candidate once more for the Brooks Wallace Shortstop of the Year Award that he had won in 2013.

In 190 career games at LSU, Bregman batted .338/.412/.520, with 66 strikeouts and 87 walks in 761 at bats.

== Professional career ==
=== Houston Astros (2015–2024) ===
==== Draft and minor leagues ====
Going into the draft, Bregman was lauded for his sense of the strike zone, bat speed, and ability to make frequent contact and strike out infrequently. He was also praised for his good range to both sides, first-step quickness, and instincts at shortstop, strong arm, good speed, and smart baserunning.

The Houston Astros selected Bregman with the second overall selection in the first round of the 2015 MLB draft. He became the fifth LSU Tiger to be drafted in the first round in seven years, the highest-drafted position player in LSU's history, and the second-highest overall behind pitcher Ben McDonald (1989). He is the highest-ever-drafted player from New Mexico, ahead of ninth-selected pitchers Jim Kremmel (1971) and Duane Ward (1982), and the second-highest-ever drafted Jewish player, behind Ron Blomberg (1967).

TV analyst and former major league second baseman Harold Reynolds said he believed Bregman was projected as a major league second baseman, rather than a shortstop. However, Bregman believed he could play shortstop in the majors and said that every team that contacted him leading up to the draft had said the same. LSU head coach Paul Mainieri opined: "If you don't think Alex Bregman can play shortstop at the Major League level, you don't know the first thing about baseball." Mike Elias, the Astros' amateur scouting director, said Bregman would remain a shortstop and that he thought Bregman would play shortstop. Similarly, Astros general manager Jeff Luhnow said that there was "no question" that Bregman had the skills to play shortstop.

Bregman signed with the Astros in June 2015 for a $5.9 million signing bonus. He made his professional debut with the Quad Cities River Bandits of the Single-A Midwest League in late June. In late July, the Astros promoted Bregman to the Lancaster JetHawks of the High-A California League. Playing shortstop for the two teams, he batted a combined .294/.366/.415 in 311 plate appearances.

Bregman started 2016 with the Double-A Corpus Christi Hooks in the Texas League, hitting .297/.415 (second in the league)/.559 (third) with 14 home runs and a .975 OPS in 285 plate appearances. He was named the league's Player of the Week on April 17 and was named a Double-A mid-season All-Star. In Triple-A with the Fresno Grizzlies, in 18 games he hit .333/.373/.641. Between the two teams, in 80 games he hit .306/.406/.580 with 71 runs, 20 home runs, and 61 RBI in 314 at-bats, while playing 64 games at shortstop and 13 at third base.

USA Today named Bregman the 2016 Minor League Player of the Year. Bregman was also named MLB Pipeline 2016 Hitter of the Year, and was selected as the third baseman for the MLB Pipeline 2016 Prospect Team of the Year. In addition, he was named the 2016 Astros' Minor League Player of the Year, ESPN.com Prospect of the Year, and a Baseball America Minor League All-Star.

==== 2016: Rookie season ====
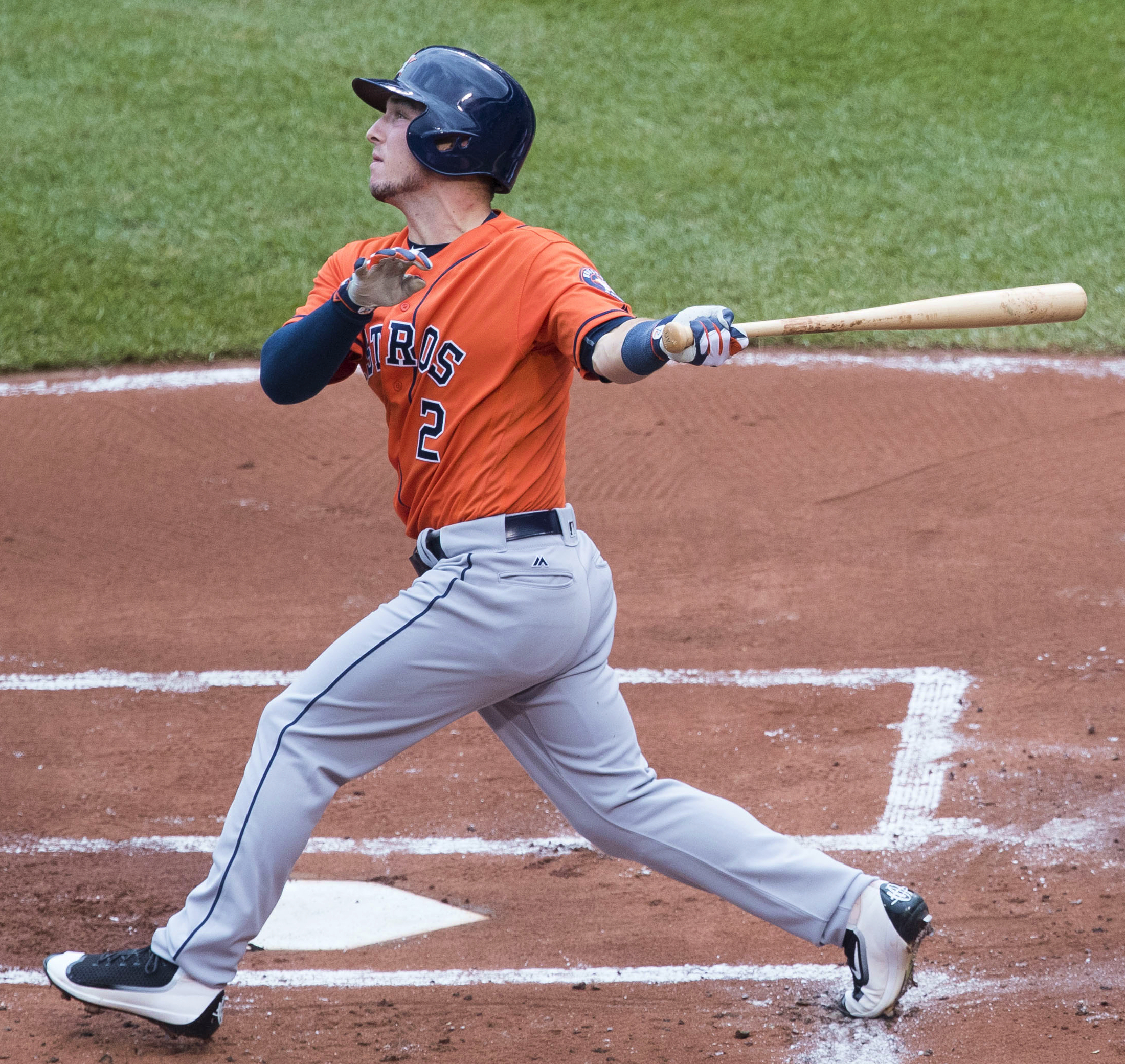
Bregman with the Astros in 2016

On July 25, 2016, the Astros purchased Bregman's contract from the Grizzlies, adding him to their 25-man roster. He made his major league debut at third base against the New York Yankees that same day. He was the first position player from the 2015 draft to debut in the Major Leagues. After he was hitless in his first 17 major league at bats through five games, the Astros moved him up to second in the batting order, to get him better pitches and demonstrate their confidence in him.

Bregman recorded his first major league hit on July 31 against the Detroit Tigers, with a single into center field. His first home run came at home on August 16, tying the game against the Cardinals in the first inning with a two-run home run to right field at Minute Maid Park. For the 2016 season, he batted .264/.313/.478 with 8 home runs and 34 RBIs in 49 games. His slugging percentage was the seventh-best of any Astros rookie all-time. With 2015 AL Rookie of the Year Carlos Correa at shortstop, Bregman played 40 games at third base and four at shortstop.

==== 2017: World Series and World Baseball Classic champion ====
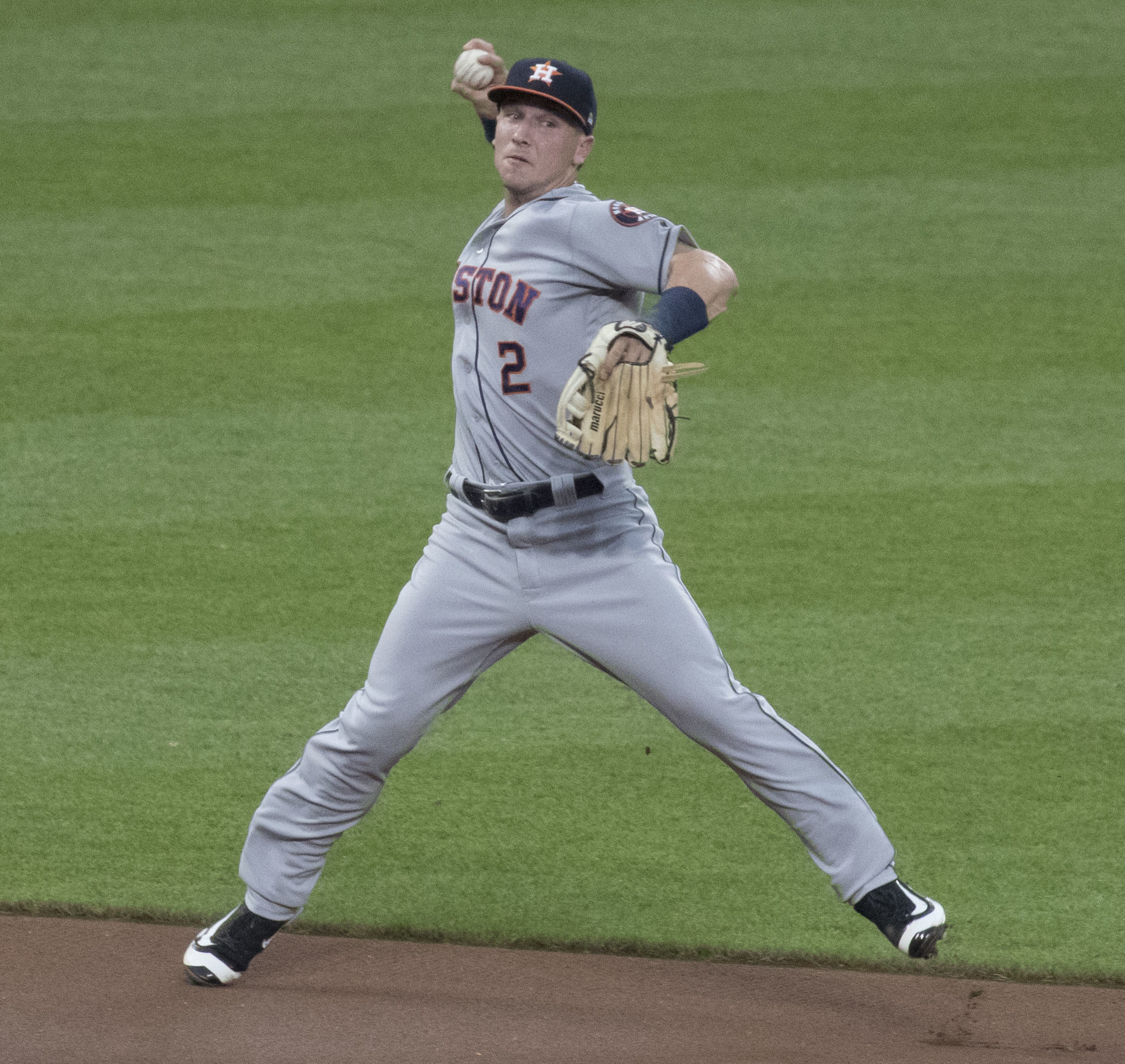
Bregman playing shortstop in 2017

At the age of 22, Bregman started his 2017 baseball season as the youngest member of Team USA in the World Baseball Classic (WBC), which won its first gold medal in the WBC by defeating Puerto Rico 8–0 in the final. He had also been invited to play for Israel, which finished sixth at the WBC, as tournament rules allow all Jewish ballplayers to play for the team. He later said that he probably should have played for Israel "because I got [just] four at-bats" playing as a backup for the U.S.

Bregman was the youngest Opening Day third baseman in team history, at 23 years and four days old. During the May 14, 2017, game versus New York at Yankee Stadium, Bregman hit his first major league grand slam, off Masahiro Tanaka, in the first inning of a 10–7 Astros win. On August 10, Bregman tied the Astros' record for extra-base hits in consecutive games at 10 games, first accomplished by outfielder Richard Hidalgo.

For the 2017 season, Bregman batted .284/.352/.475 with 39 doubles and five triples (the latter two both ninth in the AL), 19 home runs, 88 runs, 71 RBIs, and 17 stolen bases (tied for the lead among all major league third basemen). His .331 batting average against left-handers was ninth in the AL. Bregman played third base primarily (132 games), and led AL third basemen in fielding percentage (.970; the fourth-highest fielding percentage by a third baseman in team history), while also playing 30 games at shortstop. Houston won the AL West division with a 101–61 record, thus advancing Bregman to his first career major league playoff.

Bregman was a major force for the Astros throughout the 2017 postseason. His home run off Chris Sale, his second off Sale in the series, in the eighth inning of Game 4 of the ALDS tied the game 3-3 and jump-started the Astros' rally that led them to a 5–4 win over the Red Sox and propelled them to their first appearance in a Championship Series since 2005. Bregman also showcased his defensive skills throughout the postseason, but especially during the ALCS against the Yankees. In Game 7, with the Astros up 1–0 with Yankees on first and third in the top of the fifth, Bregman threw out Greg Bird at home on a chopper to third off the bat of Todd Frazier to help preserve the lead. It helped lead the Astros to a 4–0 victory in the pennant-clinching game.

Bregman would once again throw out a runner at home from third base in Game 4 of the World Series against the Los Angeles Dodgers when he gunned down Austin Barnes at the plate in the top of the sixth inning to preserve a scoreless tie. Bregman also homered off Kenley Jansen in the bottom of the ninth, but the Astros ultimately fell 6–2. His biggest contribution came during Game 5 when, after a back-and-forth game in which the Astros came back from two separate three-run deficits, Bregman hit a walk-off single in the bottom of the 10th inning off Jansen to give the Astros a 13–12 victory and a 3–2 series lead. It was Bregman's first career walk-off hit. He became the second player to drive in a run in each of his first five World Series games, joining Amos Otis. The series lasted seven games, and the Astros won the World Series for the first time. Bregman finished his first postseason with four home runs and 10 RBIs.

==== 2018: All-Star Game MVP ====
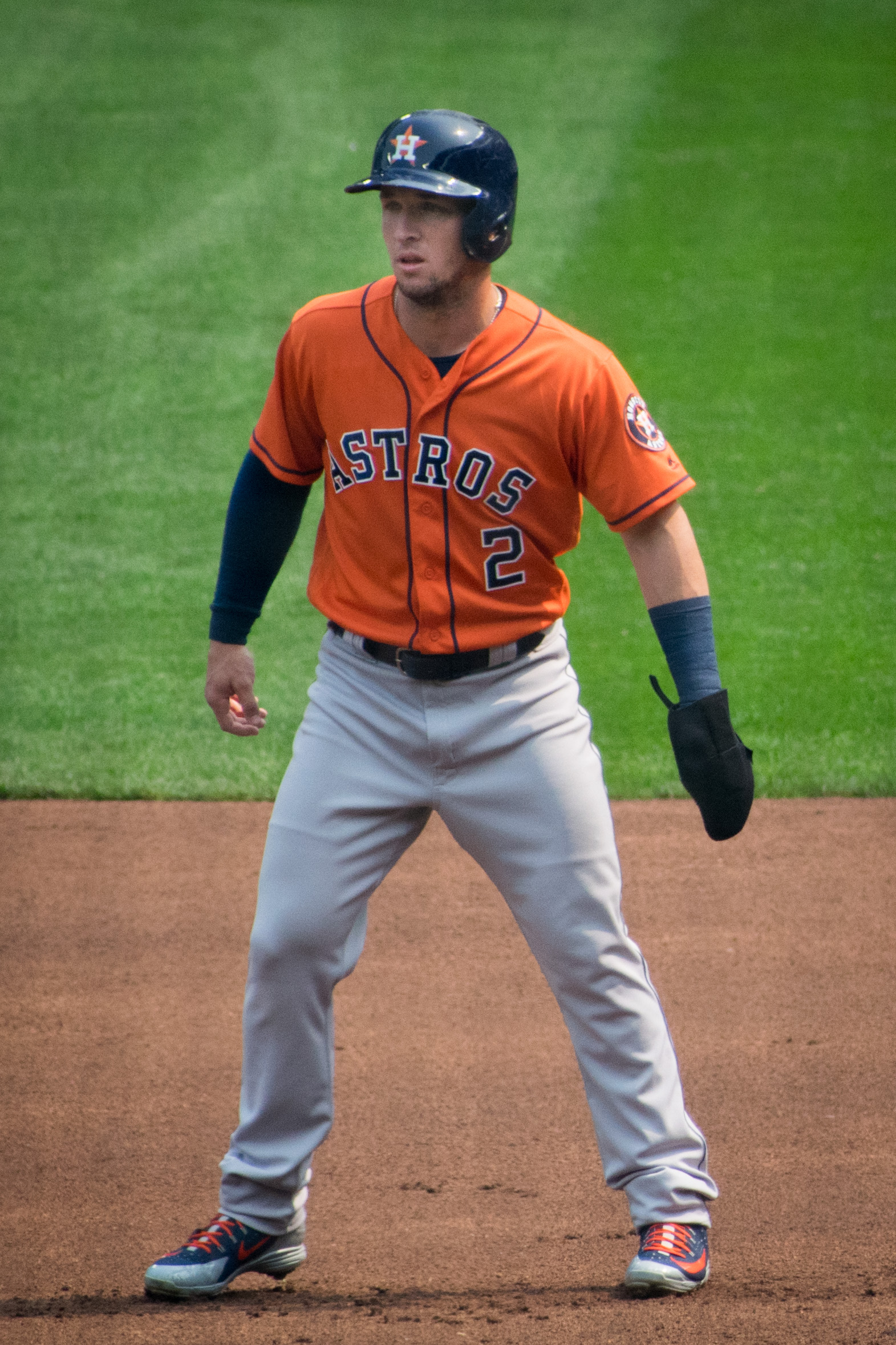
Bregman on base in 2018.

In 2018, the Astros renewed Bregman's contract at $599,000 – an increase of $60,000. In June he was named AL Player of the Month, after batting .306/.372/.713 in 108 at bats, with 11 home runs and 30 RBIs (a new Astros record for June). He became the second Astros third baseman to win the award, along with Art Howe (May 1981). Bregman was also named the AL Player of the Week for the week of June 25 – July 1, during which he batted .464/.516/1.179 in 28 at bats with five doubles, five home runs, and ten RBIs.

Batting .284 with 17 home runs, 57 RBIs, and 29 doubles, he was named to the 2018 MLB All-Star Game. Bregman was also selected to participate in the 2018 Home Run Derby. After he hit a go-ahead home run in the 10th inning off Ross Stripling, he was named the Astros' first All-Star Game MVP.

In the second half of the season, Bregman became the focal point of the Astros offense as injuries to Carlos Correa, George Springer, and Jose Altuve took all three of them out of the lineup for most of July and early August. Bregman helped carry the Astros offense through a rough skid in which he batted .342 with 6 home runs and 18 RBIs. During this stretch, the Dugout Stare, a home run celebration that Bregman had begun performing during the 2017 postseason, became popular among his teammates and on social media. In a game against the Seattle Mariners on August 22, Tyler White hit a solo home run in the top of the 9th inning of a 10–7 win. A large group of Astros players, including Bregman, performed a synchronized dugout stare into the camera, eventually becoming their new team home run celebration. The moment gained social media buzz with local Houston businesses and news outlets.

On September 8, Bregman became the youngest Astro ever to hit 30 home runs in a season, at 24 years old. On September 12, he picked up his 50th double of the season as well as his 100th RBI and 100th run scored. Bregman became the first Astro to log 100 RBIs in a season since Carlos Lee in 2009, and the first primary third baseman in Major League history to record 50 doubles and 30 home runs in a season. He also became the first player since Albert Pujols in 2012 to hit 30 home runs and 50 doubles, and drive in 100 runs. Bregman also extended his on-base streak to 39 games (the longest in team history since 1999) and tied Jeff Bagwell's franchise record of reaching base in 51 consecutive games on the road (established in 2001).

For the 2018 regular season, he batted .286/.394 (4th in the AL)/.532 (6th in the AL) with 31 home runs and 51 doubles (leading the AL; the 3rd-most in Astros history), 83 extra base hits (2nd in the league), 96 walks (3rd), 105 runs and 103 RBIs (each 5th in the AL), 7.0 at bats per strikeout (9th), and a 15.1 power–speed number (10th). Bregman batted .386/.488/.735 with runners in scoring position, the highest slugging percentage in the major leagues and the second-best OPS (behind Mike Trout). He demonstrated elite plate discipline, as he was 2nd in the American League in lowest swinging strike percentage (4.3%) and O-Swing percentage (20.0%), and 3rd in contact percentage (88.5%), and 3rd in the major leagues in walks/strikeout (1.13).

Bregman received consideration for several end-of-season awards. Bregman ranked 5th in voting for the American League Most Valuable Player Award (AL MVP) and on defense, Bregman was a finalist for the Gold Glove Award at third base. The Houston chapter of the Baseball Writers' Association of America named him the Astros' most valuable player. and he was Houston's nominee for the Heart & Hustle Award.

In the 2018 American League Division Series, Bregman batted .556, and his .714 OBP was the third-highest all-time in a division series, while his 1.333 slugging percentage was fourth-highest all-time.

==== 2019: Silver Slugger Award and All-MLB Second Team ====
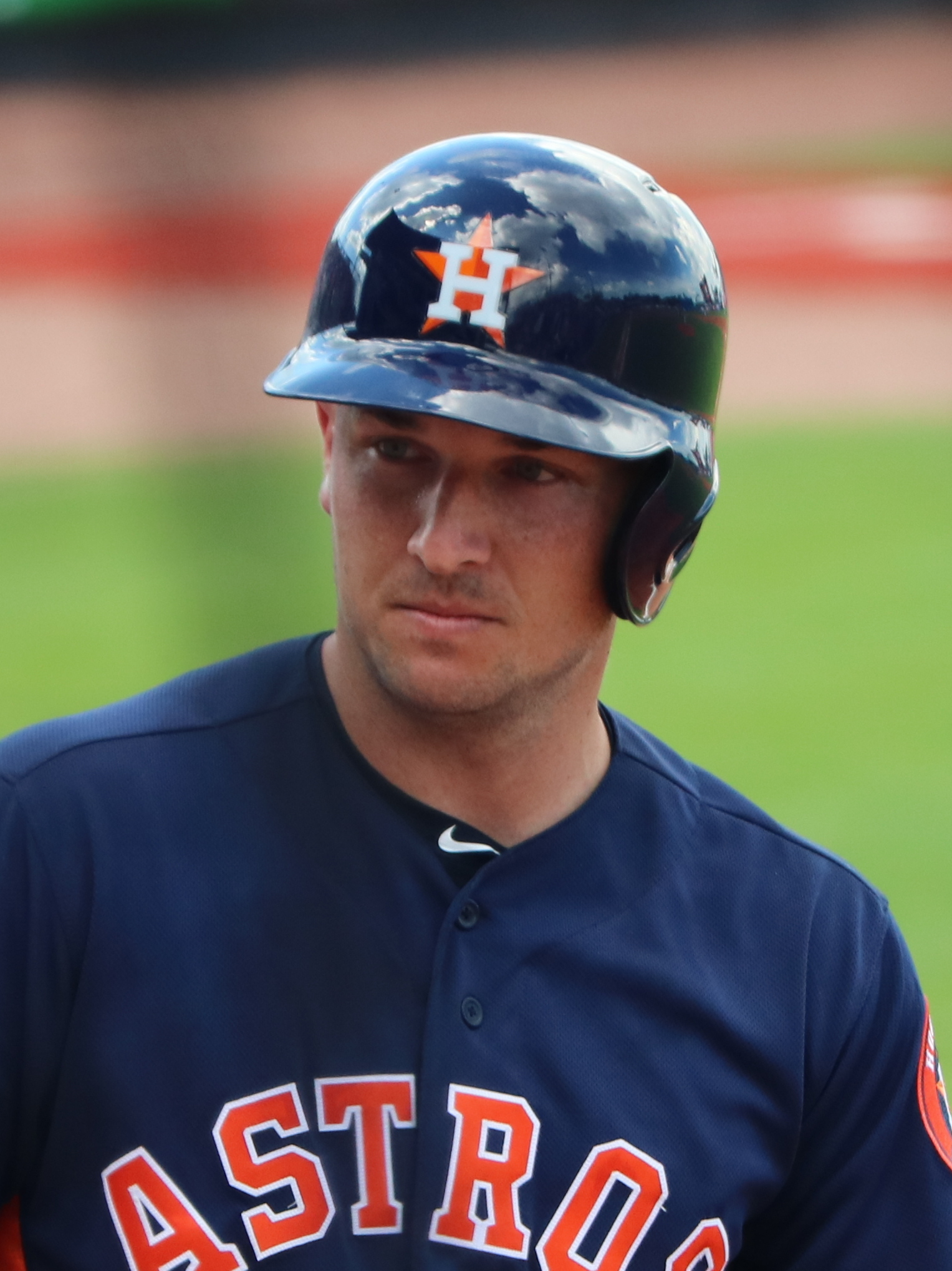
Bregman in March 2019

In early January 2019, Bregman had arthroscopic surgery to remove bone chips in his right elbow. He returned to action in spring training on March 2.

In March, Bregman and the Astros agreed to a six-year, $100 million contract extension. The deal covered the 2019 season, the three years he would have been eligible for arbitration, and the first two years he could have been a free agent. It was the second-highest contract in club history. The contract was also the third-largest ever for a player with between two and three years of major league service time.

Bregman was named the American League Player of the Month for August 2019.

For the 2019 regular season, he batted .296/.423/.592 (tied for 8th-highest in Astros history), led the major leagues in walks (119; 6th-most in Astros history) and walk-to-strikeout ratio (1.43), and led the American League in times on base (292; 9th-highest in team history) and Wins Above Replacement ("WAR"; 8.4; second-best in Astros history). Bregman was also 2nd in the AL in on base percentage (.423), 3rd in home runs (41; 7th-most in team history), slugging percentage (.592), and on base plus slugging percentage (1.015), 4th in runs scored (122; 9th-most in Astros history), 5th in RBIs (112), extra base hits (80; 8th-most in Astros history), and sacrifice flies (8), 7th in games played (156), 8th in at-bats-per-strikeout (6.7), and 9th in at-bats-per-home-run (13.5; 10th-best in team history). He swung at the lowest percentage of pitches outside the strike zone of all major league batters (18.8%). He was one of three major league players with at least 100 runs, 100 walks, and 100 RBIs, joining Mike Trout and Juan Soto. He became the only player in Astros history to hit 40 or more homers in a season while striking out fewer than 100 times, and joined Joe Morgan as the only players in team history to amass 100 or more walks and strike out fewer than 90 times in a season. On defense, he played 99 games at third base, and 65 games at shortstop.

In the 2019 postseason, Bregman enjoyed an excellent ALDS against the Tampa Bay Rays, batting .353/.450/.647 with two doubles, one home run, three walks, and two RBIs. Bregman's bat went ice cold in the ALCS and first three games of the World Series, though, as he struggled through a 4-for-31 (.129) slump with only one home run and three RBIs. Bregman broke out of his slump in Game 4 of the World Series by hitting 3-for-5 with a grand slam and 5 RBIs in an 8–1 Astros win that tied the series at 2–2. His grand slam was the first-ever hit by an Astro in the Fall Classic, and just the second-ever in the playoffs, following Lance Berkman's blast in Game 4 of the 2005 National League Division Series (NLDS). The Astros eventually lost the series to the Washington Nationals in seven games.

After the season, he received the 2019 American League Silver Slugger Award at third base, as the best offensive player in the league at the position. Bregman came in second in the vote for 2019 American League Most Valuable Player, with 335 points (13 first-place votes, and 17 second-place votes) as winner Mike Trout garnered 355 points (17 first-place votes, and 13 second-place votes), with the two players being listed first and second on every ballot. He was voted 2019 All-MLB Team Second Team.

==== 2020 ====
In late 2019, the Houston Astros sign stealing scandal broke, revealing that the Astros had illegally stolen signs using technology in 2017 and 2018. MLB investigated and punished the Astros organization. In January 2020, Bregman appeared before the media at the Astros' annual fan festival in Houston. He answered repeated attempts by reporters to have him address the scandal with variations of the same phrase: "The commissioner made his report, made his decision, and the Astros made their decision and I have no further comment on it." On February 13, the Astros held a news conference at their spring training facility to address the scandal. Bregman said, "I am really sorry about the choices that were made by my team, by the organization, and by me. I have learned from this and I hope to regain the trust of baseball fans." At that same news conference, Astros owner Jim Crane denied allegations that Bregman and other Astros players wore buzzer devices in 2019, saying, "I truly believe there were no buzzers, ever, and I don't even know where that came from."

On July 27, 2020, Bregman hit his 100th career home run, off Kendall Graveman of the Seattle Mariners.

In the pandemic-shortened 2020 season, Bregman batted .242/.350/.451 with 6 home runs and 22 RBIs, in 153 at bats. On defense he had the second-highest fielding percentage of all AL third basemen, at .979, and played 42 games at third base. Through 2020 he had the fourth-highest career on-base percentage (.381), slugging percentage (.521), and OPS (.902) of all Astros batters, and the 8th-best career rate of at-bats-per-home-run (19.6).

==== 2021 ====
On June 16, 2021, Bregman strained his left quadriceps in a game versus the Texas Rangers, as he attempted to avoid hitting into a double play. He was batting .275 with seven home runs and 34 RBIs at the time. The injury caused him to miss over two months of the season. He returned August 25, scoring the winning run versus the Kansas City Royals.

In the regular season, Bregman batted .270/.355/.422 with 12 home runs and 55 RBIs in 91 games and 348 at bats, playing third base exclusively. For his meritorious character and service to the community, the Houston chapter of the Baseball Writers' Association of America (BBWAA) honored Bregman with the Darryl Kile Good Guy Award for 2021. He was also Houston's nominee for the annual Roberto Clemente Award.

In Game 6 of the 2021 World Series, Bregman made his 73rd postseason start as part of the infield unit of Jose Altuve, Carlos Correa, and Yuli Gurriel, which was more postseason starts together than any quartet of teammates in major league history, surpassing the Yankees' Derek Jeter, Tino Martinez, Paul O’Neill, and Bernie Williams, who had started 68 postseason contests together.

==== 2022: Second World Series championship ====
Bregman was named AL Player of the Week on April 10, 2022, his second career weekly award. Over the four games comprising MLB's Opening Weekend, he batted .429 (6-for-14) with two home runs, six RBIs, and a 1.286 OPS. Bregman drove in a career-high six runs versus the White Sox on August 18, both homering and doubling twice and scoring four runs to lead a 21–5 win with 25 hits, tied for both the second-highest scoring output and most hits in team history. His two-run double in the third inning of the game was the 200th of Bregman's career, setting a club record for fewest games to reach the threshold (765), surpassing that of teammate Altuve (804).

Entering the month of August with a .773 OPS, Bregman batted 362/.452/.681 with nine doubles, seven home runs, 22 RBIs, 17 walks, and 27 runs scored over 27 games to win AL Player of the Month honors. It was his third career monthly award. On September 11, Bregman hit a grand slam that gave the Astros the go-ahead runs in a 12–3 win over the Los Angeles Angels. It was his fourth career grand slam, and first since 2019. Bregman doubled and drove in two runs on September 19 versus the Rays to power a 4–0 Astros' win that clinched a fifth AL West division title over the previous six seasons.

In 2022, Bregman batted .259/.366/.454 in 548 at bats with 93 runs (5th in the AL), 38 doubles (10th), 23 home runs, 93 RBIs (8th), 87 walks (2nd), and 7.1 at-bats-per-strikeout (9th), while leading the AL with 10 sacrifice flies. He led the AL in lowest percentage of balls outside the strike zone swung at (21.8%), and was 3rd in the AL in BB/SO ratio (1.13). Bregman was also one of two qualified batters in the majors to collect more walks than strikeouts while hitting at least 20 home runs, alongside Juan Soto. He was named a finalist for the 2022 Silver Slugger Award (3B). On defense, he led all AL third basemen in assists, and was second in putouts, double plays, and fielding percentage (.983).

Bregman ended the season 8th on the Astros' all-time career list in hit by pitch (45), 9th in home runs (140) and extra base hits (359), and 10th in doubles (204). He was 10th among all active ballplayers in career on base percentage (.375).

During the 2022 ALDS, Bregman batted .333/.375/.600 with one home run and three RBIs in 15 at bats. In the 2022 American League Championship Series, he batted a nearly identical .333/.375/.600 with one home run and four RBIs in 15 at bats. He hit his 14th career postseason home run in Game 2 of the 2022 ALCS to move past Justin Turner for most by a third baseman; his 43 career RBIs in the playoffs set a record as the most all-time by a third baseman.

In the second game of the World Series, Bregman hit a home run, setting the record for the most career World Series home runs by a third baseman, at six, in his 22nd career World Series game. It was also his 15th career postseason home run, tying him with Babe Ruth. The Astros won the World Series, defeating the Philadelphia Phillies in six games, as Bregman earned his second World Series ring; immediately after the series ended, it was revealed that Bregman had broken his finger late in the game, which might have meant he would've missed a potential Game 7. At any rate, he would prove fine to return before the 2023 season began.

==== 2023 ====
On April 23, 2023, Bregman drove in the 500th run of his career. In June, he hit three grand slams, tying a major league record for one calendar month as the 10th player. (Note: Bregman succeeded Carlos Beltrán in July 2006, and then-teammate Yordan Alvarez became the next to accomplish the feat in June 2026.) Bregman hit his fifth career grand slam on June 3 while drawing four walks to lead a 9–6 win over the Angels. It was his first four-walk game since June 12, 2019, versus the Milwaukee Brewers. He joined Bobby Bonds and J. D. Martinez as the only players to achieve the feat in one game, and become the only player in the Modern Era to draw four walks and hit a grand slam in his only official at bat, per OptaSTATS. On June 29, he hit his third grand slam of the month against the St. Louis Cardinals. His seventh career grand slam tied him with Jose Altuve and Carlos Lee for the most in franchise history.

In the 2023 regular season with the Astros, Bregman batted .262/.363/.441 in 622 at bats, with 103 runs (3rd in the American League), 25 home runs, 98 RBIs (6th), 92 walks (3rd), and 87 strikeouts, with 7.1 at-bats-per-strikeout (3rd), as his range factor/game of 2.44 was third-best among AL third basemen. He was in the top 5% in the majors in strikeout percentage, whiff percentage, and chase percentage. Through the end of the 2023 season, he was among the top-10 Astros career leaders in doubles (235; 8th), home runs (165; 8th), OPS (.861; 5th), OBP (.373; 8th), slugging percentage (.487; 8th), runs (615; 10th), RBIs (588; 10th), and walks (532; 10th).

==== 2024 ====
Bregman recorded his 1,000th career hit on April 25, 2024, a single in the sixth inning of a 3–1 loss to the Chicago Cubs. He became the 14th player to amass as many hits as a member of the Astros. Along with Yordan Alvarez, Bregman was named AL co-Player of the Week for the week ended August 11. The pair combined to lead the Astros to 5 wins in 6 games; Bregman batted .444, 1.389 OPS, three doubles, three home runs, three walks, and six RBI. This was the second occurrence in club history with co-Players of the Week; on September 10, 2000, Richard Hidalgo and Julio Lugo shared the honors.

For the 2024 season, Bregman batted .260/.315/.453 over 145 games and 635 plate appearances, 30 doubles, 26 home runs, and 75 RBI. His at bat-per-strikeout ratio ranked 4th in the AL at 6.8. Defensively, he graded at 6 runs saved above average, and led AL third basemen in games for a third consecutive year (142), assists for a third consecutive year (242), putouts (103), double plays turned (23), total zone runs (12), range factor per game (2.43), and fielding percentage (.972). He ranked 3rd in errors committed (10).

Following the season, Bregman became a free agent after rejecting a one-year, $21.05 million qualifying offer from the Astros.He was named AL Gold Glove Award winner at third base for the first time.

=== Boston Red Sox (2025) ===
On February 15, 2025, Bregman signed a three-year, $120 million contract with the Boston Red Sox, including opt-out options after the 2025 and 2026 seasons. Rafael Devers, who had already held the full-time third base job for the Red Sox, initially said he would not accept a change in position; Bregman said he was willing to move to second base if necessary. Bregman became the primary third baseman after Devers was moved to the role of designated hitter on March 26.

Bregman made his Red Sox debut on March 27, 2025, against the Texas Rangers, going 0-for-4 in a 5–2 win. On March 28, Bregman singled to center field for his first hit as a Red Sox off Shawn Armstrong in the top of the sixth inning, going 1-for-4 in the game. On April 3, he hit his first home run as a Red Sox off Charlie Morton against the Baltimore Orioles, a two-run home run in the top of the first inning. In that same game, he produced his first multi-extra base hit game of the season by later adding two doubles as he went 3-for-5 and scored three RBI in an 8–4 win. Bregman was named AL Player of the Week on April 7 after hitting .407/.448/.815 with 5 doubles, two home runs with 10 RBIs. On April 15, 2025, Bregman went 5-for-5, two homers, a double, four RBIs against the Tampa Bay Rays in a Red Sox 7–4 win. That game was Bregman's first career five-hit game. Bregman recorded his 200th career home run on May 7, 2025, a solo home run in the bottom of the fourth inning of a 6–4 win over the Texas Rangers.

On May 23, Bregman was removed from a game at Fenway Park in the fifth inning—the following day, he was placed on the injured list with a right quadriceps strain. Bregman was named to the 2025 All-Star Game roster as a reserved infielder, his third All-Star selection. Due to injury, he opted not to participate, and his spot was replaced by Junior Caminero of the Tampa Bay Rays. Bregman was activated off the injured list on July 11. On August 11, Bregman played his first game as a visiting player against the Houston Astros and got a standing ovation from the fans. In the game, he went 2-for-4 with a two-run home run and two RBI, even though the Red Sox lost to the Astros, 7-6.

For the 2025 season, Bregman batted .273/.360/.462 over 114 games and 495 plate appearances, 28 doubles, 18 home runs, and 62 RBI. In the Wild Card Series against the New York Yankees, he went 3-for-10, batted .300/.462/.400 with a double, an RBI, walked three times, and struck out twice in the series. On November 3, 2025, Bregman opted out of his contract and became a free agent.

=== Chicago Cubs (2026–present) ===
Alex Bregman on deck for the Chicago Cubs in a spring training game (20 February 2026).

On January 14, 2026, Bregman signed a five-year contract worth $175 million with the Chicago Cubs; a reported $70 million of the contract is deferred. By joining the Cubs, he reunited as teammates with shortstop Dansby Swanson formerly on the 2014 USA Collegiate National Team, the only player drafted ahead of Bregman (number 1 overall) in 2015, and as opponents in both the SEC and during the 2021 World Series.

Through the All-Star break of the 2026 season, Bregman struggled offensively, batting .241/.336/.359 across 94 games. He cited that "the start of the year was super frustrating. But the way I looked at it was like, I’m going to figure out what’s going on, so I know for the next 10 years of my career, so I [don't] have to deal with this again." He rebounded in the second half of the season, later crediting video analysis of his mechanics and ongoing communication with manager Craig Counsell for the turnaround.

On August 12, Bregman hit his first three-homer and seven RBI game against the Washington Nationals. He followed this performance by hitting three home runs over two games against the Seattle Mariners on August 21 and 22, though the Cubs lost both games. On August 31, Bregman hit his second three-homer game of the month, contributing to a team-record nine home runs in a victory against the Milwaukee Brewers. On September 21, Bregman suffered multiple facial fractures after being struck in the face by a Michael Busch foul ball.

In the 2026 season, Bregman batted .265/.355/.464 with 33 doubles (8th in the NL), 28 home runs, 92 runs, and 93 RBI, and on defense, led NL third basemen in assists (251) and double plays (30), with a .982 fielding percentage (2nd). On November 1st he was awarded his 2nd Gold Glove. Bregman also received the Fielding Bible Award for the first time. On November 11, Bregman was named to the All-MLB Second Team.

== International career ==
On January 15, 2026, it was announced that he would play for Team USA in the 2026 World Baseball Classic.

== Personal life ==
In January 2020, Bregman became engaged to Reagan Howard, and they married in December of that year. They reside in Houston year-round. Their first child, a son, was born on August 1, 2022. Their second child, a son, was born on April 17, 2025.

He has owned several dogs in his life. In 2019, he and Howard got a puppy named Hank. Growing up, he had two dogs named after his baseball heroes, Jeter (named after Derek Jeter) and Koufax (after fellow Jewish ball player Sandy Koufax). Bregman also owns race horses.

With several Astros teammates of Latin descent, including Jose Altuve, Yordan Alvarez, and Yuli Gurriel, Bregman consistently practiced and improved his Spanish-speaking ability. He began to study Spanish as a child in school in his hometown of Albuquerque, where nearly half of the population is Latino.

== See also ==
- Houston Astros award winners and league leaders
- List of Jewish Major League Baseball players
- List of Louisiana State University alumni
- List of Major League Baseball annual doubles leaders
- List of people from Albuquerque, New Mexico

== Notes ==
Awards and achievements
Preceded by Francisco Lindor; Yuli Gurriel; Aaron Judge	American League Player of the Month; June 2018; August 2019; August 2022	Succeeded by José Ramírez; Austin Meadows; Aaron Judge
Preceded by Nelson Cruz; George Springer; Vladimir Guerrero Jr. Aaron Judge	American League Player of the Week; June 25 – July 1, 2018; April 7 – 10, 2022; August 5 – 11, 2024; April 1 – 6, 2025	Succeeded by Xander Bogaerts; José Ramírez; Bowden Francis; Ty France
