= Colleen Denney =

American art historian

- Born: Colleen Jo Denney; United States
- Occupations: Art historian Educator

Academic background
- Education: Louisiana State University; University of Minnesota
- Thesis: Exhibition Reforms and Systems: The Grosvenor Gallery, 1877-1890 (1990)
- Doctoral advisor: Gabriel P. Weisberg

Academic work
- Discipline: Art history
- Sub-discipline: British art
- Institutions: University of Wyoming

Colleen Jo Denney is an American art historian and educator. A scholar of British art during the Victorian era, Denney is Professor of Art History and Gender and Women's Studies at the University of Wyoming.

== Career ==
Denney graduated from Louisiana State University with both a Bachelor of Arts in English and a Master of Arts in Art History in 1981 and 1983, respectively. She then continued on to the University of Minnesota to receive a Doctor of Philosophy in Art History in 1990. Denney wrote a master's thesis on the photographs of Edgar Degas, and her doctoral dissertation was on Grosvenor Gallery, supervised by Gabriel P. Weisberg.

Upon receiving the doctorate, Denney was hired as Assistant Professor of Art History at the University of Wyoming. Seven years later, she was promoted to Associate Professor, and then to full Professor in 2005. Four years after that, Denney was also jointly appointed as Professor of Gender and Women's Studies. She has spent her entire teaching career at Wyoming.

== Select works ==
- The Grosvenor Gallery: A Palace of Art in Victorian England, Yale University Press, 1996 ISBN 978-0300067521
- At the Temple of Art: The Grosvenor Gallery, 1877-1890, Fairleigh Dickinson University Press, 2000 ISBN 9780838638507
- Representing Diana, Princess of Wales: Cultural Memory and Fairy Tales Revisited, Fairleigh Dickinson University Press, 2005 ISBN 9780838640234
- Women, Portraiture, and the Crisis of Identity in Victorian England: My Lady Scandalous Reconsidered, Ashgate Publishing, 2009 ISBN 9780754668794

== See also ==
- List of Louisiana State University alumni
- List of University of Minnesota people
