= Byron C. Sakiadis =

American chemical engineer

- Born: Byron Christos Sakiadis; December 25, 1928; Cairo, Egypt
- Died: February 21, 2021 (aged 92); Chadds Ford, Pennsylvania, U.S.
- Education: Louisiana State University
- Known for: Sakiadis flow; boundary-layer analysis of moving continuous surfaces
- Awards: Allan P. Colburn Award (1965)
- Scientific career
- Fields: Chemical engineering, fluid mechanics, transport phenomena
- Workplaces: DuPont

Byron Christos Sakiadis (December 25, 1928 – February 21, 2021) was an American chemical engineer known for his pioneering work in boundary-layer theory. His 1961 papers in the AIChE Journal introduced what are now known as Sakiadis flows, a class of boundary-layer phenomena important in coating, extrusion, and continuous-surface processing. He spent more than three decades as a research fellow at DuPont,.. and received the Allan P. Colburn Award from AIChE in 1965.

== Early life and education ==
Sakiadis was born in Cairo, Egypt, to parents Sarrandis and Anna Sakiadis. After completing secondary school and immigrating to the United States, he studied chemical engineering at Louisiana State University. He earned both his undergraduate and doctoral degrees at LSU, where he defended a dissertation on the thermal conductivity of liquids.

== Career ==
=== DuPont (1950s–1993) ===
After earning his Ph.D., Sakiadis joined DuPont as a research fellow. Over a 35-year career, he contributed to reaction engineering, polymer processing, and heat and mass transfer. His research produced several patents and he contributed to major reference works within the field of chemical engineering.

He retired from DuPont in 1993.

== Research contributions ==
=== Sakiadis flows ===
In 1961, Sakiadis published a two-part theoretical analysis of boundary-layer behavior on a moving continuous solid surface immersed in an otherwise quiescent fluid. This configuration—opposite of the classical Blasius problem—revealed a distinct boundary-layer development and gave rise to the class of flows called Sakiadis boundary layers.

=== Influence ===
The moving-surface boundary-layer solution introduced by Sakiadis later became the basis for the stretching-sheet flow developed by Crane

Sakiadis’ original moving-surface boundary-layer solution continues to underpin modern mathematical studies of heat and mass transfer in stretching surfaces, with contemporary analyses explicitly building on his 1961 formulation

== Awards and honors ==
- 1965 – Allan P. Colburn Award for significant contributions to chemical engineering before age 35.

== Personal life ==
Sakiadis was married to Alice Sakiadis for 69 years, and they had three children—Lana, Glenn (deceased), and Paulina—along with six grandchildren and four great-grandchildren.

He died at home in Chadds Ford, Pennsylvania, on February 21, 2021, at age 92.

== Selected publications ==
- Sakiadis, Byron C. (1961). "Boundary-Layer Behavior on Continuous Solid Surfaces: I. Boundary-Layer Equations for Two-Dimensional and Axisymmetric Flow". AIChE Journal. 7 (1): 26–28. Bibcode:1961AIChE...7...26S. doi:10.1002/aic.690070108.
- Sakiadis, Byron C. (1961). "Boundary-Layer Behavior on Continuous Solid Surfaces: II. Boundary-Layer on a Continuous Flat Surface". AIChE Journal. 7 (3): 467–472. doi:10.1002/aic.690070324.
