= Joomyeong Kim =

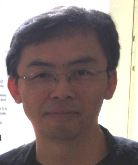
- Professor Joomyeong Kim
- Born: Joomyeong Kim
- Education: LSU Medical Center at New Orleans, LA (Ph. D.); Seoul National University (M.S., B.S.)
- Alma mater: LSU Medical Center at New Orleans, LA (Ph. D., 1995)
- Scientific career
- Fields: Genomic imprinting; Epigenetics
- Workplaces: Oak Ridge National Laboratory; Lawrence Livermore National Laboratory; Louisiana State University

Joomyeong Kim is a Russell Thompson, Jr. Family Professor of Biology at Louisiana State University. His research interests include genomic imprinting and epigenetics. Dr. Kim's laboratory is mainly involved in understanding the functions and regulatory mechanisms governing genes subject to genomic imprinting. Having previously characterized an imprinted domain located on proximal mouse chromosome 7/ human chromosome 19q13.4, his laboratory currently focuses on understanding regulatory mechanisms directing the mono-allelic expression of the seven imprinted genes in the cluster: Peg3, Usp29, Zfp264, APeg3 (paternally expressed) and Zim1, Zim2, Zim3 (maternally expressed). As a second project direction, his lab studies the function of the dominant gene in the cluster, Peg3, as a transcriptional regulator. Past projects in the Kim lab have included studying the epigenetic instability of imprinted genes during tumorigenesis, potential roles of AEBP2 as a PRC2 targeting protein and in neural crest cell development, as well as the DNA methylation of mouse and human retrotransposons.

== Education ==
- Ph.D. Biochemistry and Molecular Biology, LSU Medical Center at New Orleans, LA (Advisor, Dr. Prescott L. Deininger)
- M.S. Microbiology, Seoul National University, Seoul, South Korea (Advisor, Dr. John Jeongbin Yim) (1988)
- B.S. Microbiology, Seoul National University, Seoul, South Korea (1986)

== Selected publications ==
- Kim J, Ekram MB, Kim H, Faisal M, Frey WD, Huang JM, Tran K, Kim MM, Yu S (2012). "Imprinting control region (ICR) of the Peg3 domain". Hum Mol Genet. 21 (12): 2677–87. doi:10.1093/hmg/dds092. PMC 3363340. PMID 22394678.
- Thiaville MM, Kim H, Frey WD, Kim J (2013). "Identification of an evolutionarily conserved cis-regulatory element controlling the Peg3 imprinted domain". PLOS ONE. 8 (9) e75417. Bibcode:2013PLoSO...875417T. doi:10.1371/journal.pone.0075417. PMC 3769284. PMID 24040411.
- Kim J, Frey WD, He H, Kim H, Ekram MB, Bakshi A, Faisal M, Perera BP, Ye A, Teruyama R (2013). "Peg3 mutational effects on reproduction and placenta-specific gene families". PLOS ONE. 8 (12) e83359. Bibcode:2013PLoSO...883359K. doi:10.1371/journal.pone.0083359. PMC 3877027. PMID 24391757.
- Thiaville MM, Huang JM, Kim H, Ekram MB, Roh TY, Kim J (January 2013). "DNA-binding motif and target genes of the imprinted transcription factor PEG3". Gene. 512 (2): 314–20. doi:10.1016/j.gene.2012.10.005. PMC 3513644. PMID 23078764.
