= Michelle K. Johnston =

American management professor and executive coach

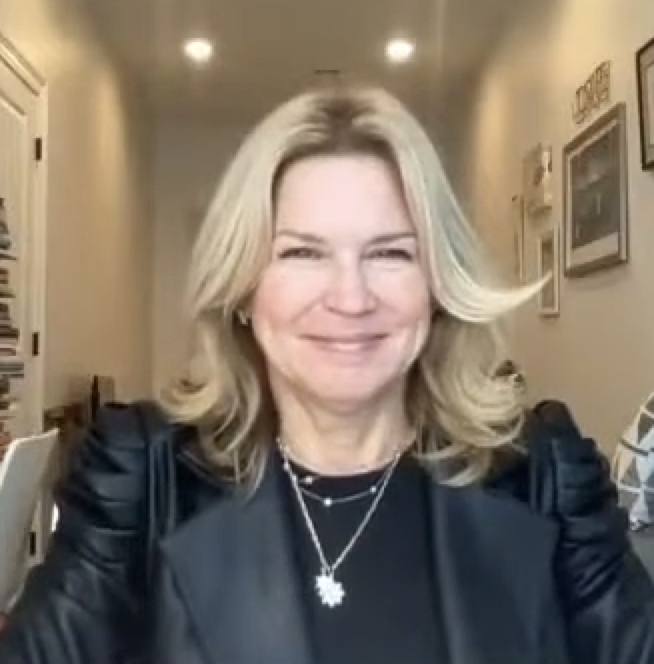
- Johnston in 2022
- Other name: Michelle D. Kirtley

Academic background
- Education: Auburn University; Louisiana State University

Academic work
- Discipline: Management studies
- Institutions: Loyola University New Orleans

Michelle D. Kirtley Johnston is an American management professor and executive coach who is the Clifton A. Morvant Distinguished Professor in Business at Loyola University New Orleans.

== Life ==
Johnston earned a B.A. (1991) in public relations with a minor in journalism and a M.A. (1994) in the department of communication from Auburn University. Her master's thesis was titled, Can We Talk? Exploring the Impact of Gender-role Self-perceptions on Communication Styles. James B. Weaver, III was her thesis advisor. Johnston earned a Ph.D. in communication theory with a minor in organizational development from the Louisiana State University in 1999. Her dissertation was titled, The Influence of Communication Variables on Group Attraction and Group Communication Satisfaction. Her dissertation co-chairs were Loretta Pecchioni and Renee Edwards.

Johnston is a management professor and executive coach. She joined the college of business at Loyola University New Orleans in 1999 as an assistant professor of management. She was promoted to associate professor in 2008, professor in 2017, and Gaston Professor of Business in 2019. In 2023, Johnston became the Clifton A. Morvant Distinguished Professor in Business.

Johnston's first book, The Seismic Shift in Leadership: How to Thrive in a New Era of Connection, was published in 2022 by Advantage Media Group, becoming an Amazon Bestseller. Drawing on interviews with prominent business leaders, the book examines the role of connection in leadership, emphasizing leaders' relationships with themselves, their teams, and their organizations.

In 2025, Johnston released her second book, The Seismic Shift in You: The Seven Necessary Shifts to Create Connection and Drive Results, with Marshall Goldsmith and published by 100 Coaches Publishing. The book examines changes leaders can make in their behavior and priorities to strengthen workplace connections and drive business results. It received the silver medal in the Leadership: Culture category of the 2026 Axiom Business Book Awards and is an Amazon Bestseller.

In March 2026, Michelle Johnston was named the 2026 Remarkable Woman for the New Orleans area market, an annual program organized by WGNO and Nexstar Media Group.

== Selected works ==
- Johnston, Michelle K. (2025). The Seismic Shift in You: The Seven Necessary Shifts to Create Connection and Drive Results. 100 Coaches Publishing. ISBN 979-8-89138-622-8.
- Johnston, Michelle K. (2022). The Seismic Shift in Leadership: How to Thrive in a New Era of Connection. Advantage Media Group, Incorporated. ISBN 978-1-64225-235-4.
