= Lisa Rhoades =

American poet (born 1963)

Lisa Carol Rhoades (born 13 February 1963 in Kansas) is an American poet.

== Biography ==
Rhoades received her B.A. from Louisiana State University and her M.F.A. from Columbia University. Prior to receiving her nursing degree from New York University, Rhoades was a production editor at the Institute of International Education.

She has also taught workshops in poetry.

Rhoades is the daughter of John D. Rhoades, a retired dean of veterinary medicine at L.S.U., and Carol Rhoades. She is married to David Nygard and lives with her husband and children in New York City.

== Bibliography ==
=== Books and chapbooks ===
- Strange Gravity. Treadwell, NY: Bright Hill Press, 2004. ISBN 1-892471-24-8 ISBN 978-1892471246

=== Broadsides ===
- "The Week I Thought I Was." Winona, MN: Sutton Hoo Press, 2001.

=== Journals ===
- Richard Jones, ed. Poetry East #33. DePaul University, 1992. ASIN B000M7J89U
- "Ugly", "Wrecked", "The New Jersey Girls Are Fixing Their Hair" and "The Week I Thought I Was", Poetry, May 2002.
- “Poppy,” Barrow Street. Winter 2017/18. Print. 95.
- “The Long Grass,” Smartish Pace. Forthcoming, March 2018. Printb
- “The Heart Saying It's OK,”Beech Street Review. January 4, 2018. Web.
- “The Words at Hand,” Sweet: A Literary Confection. Vol. 10, No. 1. September 2017, sweetlit.wordpress.com.
- “No,” Literary Mama. April, 2017. Web.
- “It Depends,” New Ohio Review. Fall, 2017. Print
- “Errand,” The Same. Vol 10, No. 4. Summer/Fall 2012. Print.
- “Yard Sonnet,” Big City Lit. Spring 2011. Web
- “Mourning Song,” Big City Lit. Spring 2011. Web
