= J. M. Tull School of Accounting =

Coordinates: 33.953902°N 83.374980°W

J.M. Tull School of Accounting
- Type: Public university
- Established: 1977
- Parent institution: Terry College of Business
- Location: Athens, Georgia, US
- Campus: University of Georgia
- Website: www.terry.uga.edu/majors-and-minor/accounting/

The J.M. Tull School of Accounting is a department within the Terry College of Business at University of Georgia in Athens, Georgia.

The School was founded in 1977 and was one of the first five schools of accounting in the United States. In 1982, the school was named after Georgia businessman J.M Tull. In 2018, graduates from the School of Accounting ranked 1st in the nation in terms of first-time pass rates for all sections of the CPA exam.
