= Louisiana's 2nd State Senate district =

American legislative district

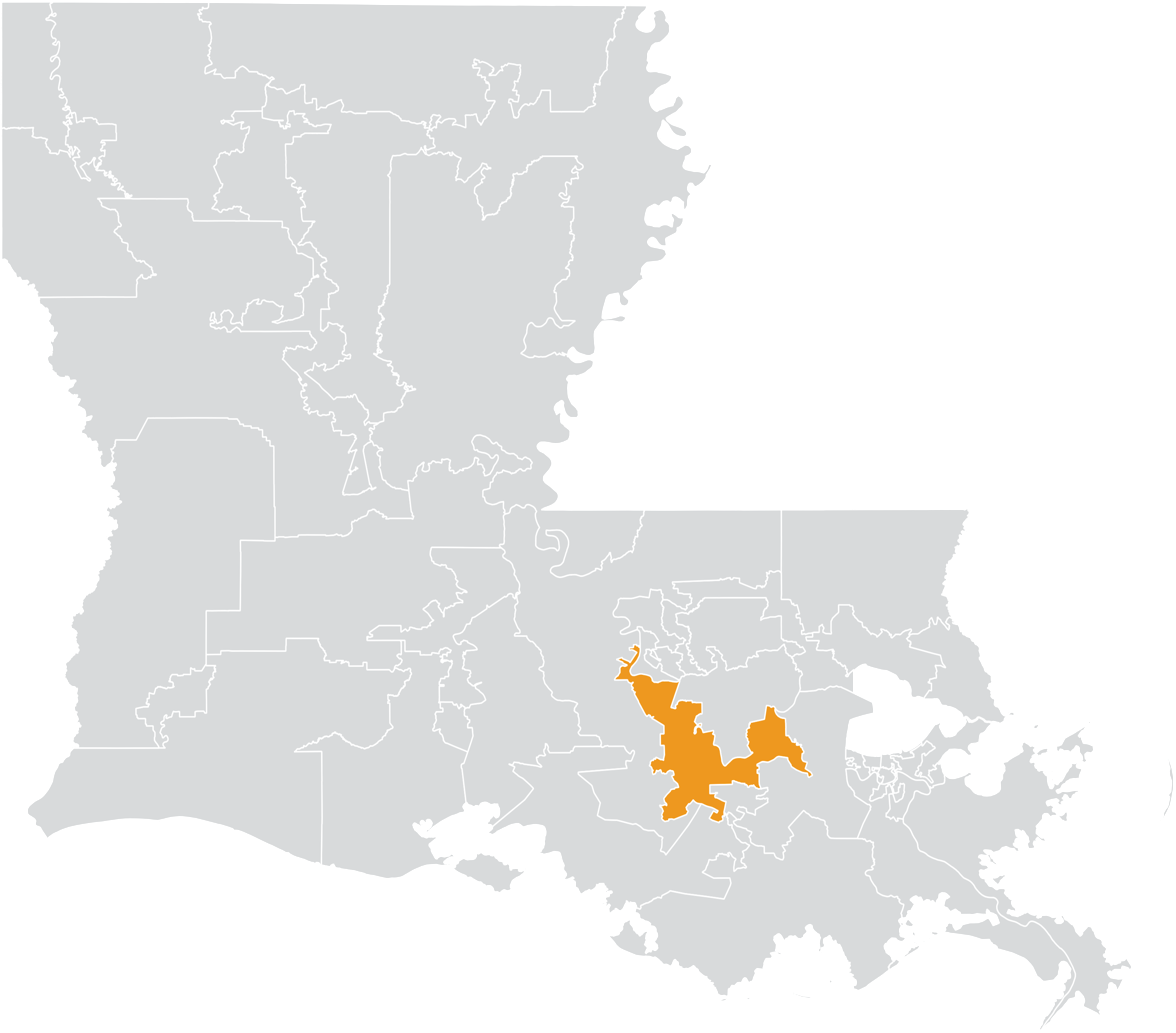
Senator
Ed Price; D–Gonzales
- Registration: 63.1% Democratic; 16.5% Republican; 20.4% No party preference
- Demographics: 41% White; 54% Black; 4% Hispanic; 0% Asian; 1% Other
- Population (2019): 113,370
- Registered voters: 72,663

Louisiana's 2nd State Senate district is one of 39 districts in the Louisiana State Senate. It has been represented by Democrat Ed Price since a 2017 special election to replace disgraced incumbent Democrat Troy Brown.

== Geography ==
District 2 stretches across a majority-Black swath of Acadiana between New Orleans and Baton Rouge, including parts of Ascension, Assumption, Iberville, Lafourche, St. Charles, St. James, St. John the Baptist, and West Baton Rouge Parishes. LaPlace, Thibodaux, Donaldsonville, and Gonzales are entirely or partially located within the district.

The district overlaps with Louisiana's 2nd and 6th congressional districts, and with the 18th, 29th, 51st, 55th, 57th, 58th, 60th, 81st, and 88th districts of the Louisiana House of Representatives.

== Recent election results ==
Louisiana uses a jungle primary system. If no candidate receives 50% in the first round of voting, when all candidates appear on the same ballot regardless of party, the top-two finishers advance to a runoff election.

=== 2019 ===
2019 Louisiana State Senate election, District 2
Party	Candidate	Votes	%
Democratic	Ed Price (incumbent)	21,605	58.8
Democratic	Troy Brown	15,114	41.2
Total votes		36,719	100
Democratic hold			

=== 2017 special ===
2017 Louisiana State Senate special election, District 2
Primary election
Party	Candidate	Votes	%
Democratic	Warren Harang III	4,001	26.5
Democratic	Ed Price	3,334	22.1
Democratic	Elton Aubert	2,283	15.1
Republican	Wayne Brigalia	1,051	7.0
Democratic	Albert "Ali" Burl III	957	6.3
Democratic	Patrick Lawless	699	4.6
Democratic	Edmond Jordan	675	4.5
Democratic	Jerry Jones	640	4.2
Democratic	Jamie Roussell	489	3.2
Democratic	Shannon Comery, Sr.	436	2.9
Independent	Thomas Lyons	374	2.5
Democratic	Chris Delpit	84	0.6
Independent	Willie Massey-Farve	54	0.4
Total votes		15,077	100
General election
Democratic	Ed Price	9,224	62.6
Democratic	Warren Harang III	5,507	37.4
Total votes		14,731	100
Democratic hold			

=== 2015 ===
2015 Louisiana State Senate election, District 2
Party	Candidate	Votes	%
Democratic	Troy Brown (incumbent)	23,829	72.0
Democratic	Chris Delpit	5,208	15.7
Independent	Eric Weil	4,072	12.3
Total votes		33,109	100
Democratic hold			

=== 2011 ===
2011 Louisiana State Senate election, District 2
Primary election
Party	Candidate	Votes	%
Democratic	Troy Brown	12,082	34.2
Democratic	Elton Aubert	10,932	31.0
Republican	Al Carter	4,966	14.1
Democratic	Mike Bell	4,519	12.8
Democratic	George Grace, Jr.	2,198	6.2
Republican	Zaine Kasem	584	1.7
Total votes		35,281	100
General election
Democratic	Troy Brown	12,863	52.7
Democratic	Elton Aubert	11,549	47.3
Total votes		24,412	100
Democratic hold			

=== Federal and statewide results ===
Year	Office	Results
2020	President	Biden 60.5–37.9%
2019	Governor (runoff)	Edwards 72.4–27.6%
2016	President	Clinton 60.7–36.8%
2015	Governor (runoff)	Edwards 75.7–24.3%
2014	Senate (runoff)	Landrieu 68.7–31.3%
2012	President	Obama 63.9–35.1%
