= Louisiana's 58th House of Representatives district =

American legislative district

Louisiana's 58th State House of Representatives district
Representative
Ken Brass; D–Vacherie

Louisiana's 58th House of Representatives district is one of 105 Louisiana House of Representatives districts. It is currently represented by Democrat Ken Brass of Vacherie.

== Geography ==
HD58 includes the cities of Donaldsonville, Gonzales, and the town of Lutcher.

== Election results ==
Year	Winning candidate	Party	Percent	Opponent	Party	Percent	Opponent	Party	Percent	Opponent	Party	Percent
2011	Ed Price	Democratic	58.3%	Dwayne Bailey	Democratic	41.7%						
2015	Ed Price	Democratic	55.3%	Micheal Aubert	Democratic	29%	Nathaniel Rapp Jr.	Democratic	15.7%			
2017- Special	Ken Brass	Democratic	56.6%	Micheal Aubert	Democratic	23%	Alsie Dunbar	Democratic	14.7%	Adrienne Ricard Conish	Democratic	5.7%
2019	Ken Brass	Democratic	76.1%	Chris Delpit	Democratic	23.9%%						
2023	Ken Brass	Democratic	Cancelled									
