= Louisiana's 88th House of Representatives district =

American legislative district

Louisiana's 88th State House of Representatives district
Representative
Kathy Edmonston; R–Gonzales

Louisiana's 88th House of Representatives district is one of 105 Louisiana House of Representatives districts. It is currently represented by Republican Kathy Edmonston.

== Geography ==
HD88 includes the city of Gonzales, the town of Sorrento, and the census-designated place of Prairieville.

== Election results ==
Year	Winning candidate	Party	Percent	Opponent	Party	Percent	Opponent	Party	Percent
2011	John Berthelot	Republican	71.4%	Coral Lambert	Republican	14.5%	Gary Lacombe	Democratic	14%
2015	John Berthelot	Republican	Cancelled						
2019	Kathy Edmonston	Republican	51.1%	Brandon Trosclair	Republican	48.9%			
2023	Kathy Edmonston	Republican	63.8%	Donald Schexnaydre	Republican	24.4%	Willie Robinson	Republican	11.8%
