= 2023 Northwestern State Demons baseball team =

American college baseball season

2023 Northwestern State Demons baseball
- Conference: Southland Conference
- Record: 29–27 (12–12 Southland)
- Head coach: Bobby Barbier (7th season)
- Assistant coaches: Chris Bertrand; Spencer Goodwin; Dan Hlad
- Home stadium: H. Alvin Brown–C. C. Stroud Field

2023 Southland Conference baseball standings
	Conf.				Overall
Team	W		L	PCT	W		L	PCT
Nicholls ‍†‍‡‍^{y}	15	–	9	.625	34	–	24	.586
Incarnate Word ‍‍‍	14	–	10	.583	28	–	26	.519
New Orleans ‍‍‍	13	–	11	.542	36	–	24	.600
Lamar ‍‍‍	13	–	11	.542	32	–	23	.582
McNeese ‍‍‍	12	–	12	.500	35	–	23	.603
Northwestern State ‍‍‍	12	–	12	.500	29	–	27	.518
Texas A&M–Corpus Christi ‍‍‍	12	–	12	.500	24	–	30	.444
Southeastern Louisiana ‍‍‍	9	–	14	.391	25	–	25	.500
Houston Christian ‍‍‍	7	–	16	.304	11	–	37	.229
† – Conference champion ‡ – Tournament champion y – Invited to the NCAA Tournament; As of June 3, 2023; Rankings from D1Baseball

The 2023 Northwestern State Demons baseball team represented Northwestern State University during the 2023 NCAA Division I baseball season. The Demons played their home games at H. Alvin Brown–C. C. Stroud Field and were led by seventh–year head coach Bobby Barbier. They are members of the Southland Conference.

== Preseason ==
=== Southland Conference Coaches Poll ===
The Southland Conference Coaches Poll was released on February 3, 2023. Northwestern State was picked to finish fifth in the Southland Conference with 65 votes and 1 first place vote.

Coaches poll
Predicted finish	Team	Votes (1st place)
1	McNeese State	118 (7)
2	Southeastern Louisiana	115 (10)
3	Lamar	88
4	New Orleans	87
5	Northwestern State	65 (1)
6	Nicholls	59
7	Texas A&M–Corpus Christi	55
8	Houston Christian	41
9	Incarnate Word	20

=== Preseason All-Southland team ===
One Northwestern State player was named to the conference preseason first team. Two players were named to the conference preseason second team.

==== First Team ====
- Edgar Alvarez (NICH, JR, 1st Base)
- Brad Burckel (MCNS, SR, 2nd Base)
- Josh Leslie (MCNS, SR, 3rd Base)
- Parker Coddou (NICH, JR, Shortstop)
- Bo Willis (NWST, JR, Catcher)
- Tre Jones (TAMUCC, JR, Designated Hitter)
- Payton Harden (MCNS, SR, Outfielder)
- Brendan Ryan (TAMUCC, SR, Outfielder)
- Xane Washington (NICH, R-SR, Outfielder)
- Zach Garcia (TAMUCC, SO, Starting Pitcher)
- Grant Rogers (MCNS, JR, Starting Pitcher)
- Tyler Theriot (NICH, SR, Starting Pitcher)
- Burrell Jones (MCNS, SR, Relief Pitcher)
- Alec Carr (UIW, SR, Utility)

==== Second Team ====
- Josh Blankenship (LU, SR, 1st Base)
- Daunte Stuart (NWST, JR, 2nd Base)
- Kasten Furr (NO, JR, 3rd Base)
- Tyler Bischke (NO, JR, Shortstop)
- Bryce Grizzaffi (SELA, SR, Catcher)
- Kade Hunter (MCNS, SR, Designated Hitter)
- Josh Caraway (TAMUCC, JR, Outfielder)
- Braden Duhon (MCNS, JR, Outfielder)
- Issac Williams (NO, JR, Outfielder)
- Cal Carver (NWST, SR, Starting Pitcher)
- Tyler LeBlanc (NO, JR, Starting Pitcher)
- Will Kinzeler (SELA, JR, Starting Pitcher)
- Dalton Aspholm (SELA, SR, Relief Pitcher)
- Tre’ Obregon III (MCNS, SR, Utility)

== Personnel ==
2023 Northwestern State Demons baseball team
Players
Coaches

#	Pos.	Name	B/T	Height	Weight	Year	Home town
1		Cole Hill	R/R	5 ft 7 in (1.7 m)	170 lb (77 kg)	Jr	Owasso, Oklahoma
2	RHP	Ethan Francis	L/R	5 ft 10 in (1.78 m)	175 lb (79 kg)	Sr	Miscouche, Canada
3	INF	Lathen Buzard	R/R	6 ft 3 in (1.91 m)	205 lb (93 kg)	Fr	Richmond, Texas
4	C	Carson Carey	R/R	6 ft 2 in (1.88 m)	215 lb (98 kg)	Fr	Bossier City, Louisiana
5	INF	Jake Haze	S/R	5 ft 9 in (1.75 m)	165 lb (75 kg)	Jr	Highlands Ranch, Colorado
9	UTL	Bailyn Sorensen	R/R	6 ft 2 in (1.88 m)	210 lb (95 kg)	So	Rayville, Louisiana
11	RHP	Grayson Gates	L/R	6 ft 2 in (1.88 m)	185 lb (84 kg)	So	Benton, Louisiana
12	OF	Cole Horton	L/R	5 ft 9 in (1.75 m)	190 lb (86 kg)	Jr	Bossier City, Louisiana
13	OF	Broch Holmes	L/R	5 ft 8 in (1.73 m)	195 lb (88 kg)	Jr	Livingston, Texas
14	OF	Gabe Colaianni	L/L	5 ft 10 in (1.78 m)	190 lb (86 kg)	Jr	Missouri City, Texas
15		Kyle Froehlich	L/R	6 ft 1 in (1.85 m)	185 lb (84 kg)	Jr	Nipawin, Saskatchewan, Canada
16	RHP	Alex Makarewich	R/R	6 ft 0 in (1.83 m)	185 lb (84 kg)	Jr	Keller, Texas
18	LHP	Cal Carver	L/L	6 ft 4 in (1.93 m)	200 lb (91 kg)	Sr	San Antonio, Texas
19	INF	Daunte Stuart	R/R	5 ft 11 in (1.8 m)	180 lb (82 kg)	Jr	The Woodlands, Texas
21	OF	Jacob Farrell	R/R	6 ft 1 in (1.85 m)	200 lb (91 kg)	Jr	Cypress, Texas
22	LHP	Corbin Talley	L/L	6 ft 4 in (1.93 m)	185 lb (84 kg)	Jr	Jones, Oklahoma
23	INF	Hayden Knotts (redshirt)	R/R	6 ft 1 in (1.85 m)	188 lb (85 kg)	Fr	Bossier City, Louisiana
24	RHP	Thomas Sotile (redshirt)	L/R	6 ft 3 in (1.91 m)	180 lb (82 kg)	So	Baton Rouge, Louisiana
25	C	Bo Willis	R/R	6 ft 1 in (1.85 m)	210 lb (95 kg)	Jr	Magnolia, Texas
26		Michael Dattalo	R/R	6 ft 0 in (1.83 m)	205 lb (93 kg)	Fr	Keller, Texas
27	RHP	Chase Prestwich	R/R	5 ft 11 in (1.8 m)	200 lb (91 kg)	So	Frederick, Colorado
31	C	James Starnes (redshirt)	L/R	5 ft 11 in (1.8 m)	190 lb (86 kg)	So	Spring, Texas
32	INF	Gray Rowlett	R/R	6 ft 5 in (1.96 m)	215 lb (98 kg)	So	Keller, Texas
33	RHP	Tyler Bryan	R/R	6 ft 2 in (1.88 m)	205 lb (93 kg)	Fr	Beckville, Texas
34	RHP	Drayton Brown	R/R	6 ft 3 in (1.91 m)	215 lb (98 kg)	Jr	Nacogdoches, Texas
35	INF	AJ Bailey (redshirt)	R/R	5 ft 10 in (1.78 m)	200 lb (91 kg)	Fr	Zachary, Louisiana
36	INF	Mason Langdon (redshirt)	R/L	6 ft 0 in (1.83 m)	192 lb (87 kg)	Fr	Shreveport, Louisiana
37	RHP	Caleb Perry	R/R	6 ft 4 in (1.93 m)	205 lb (93 kg)	Fr	Waxahachie, Texas
38	RHP	JC Acosta	R/R	5 ft 10 in (1.78 m)	175 lb (79 kg)	Fr	Lafayette, Louisiana
39	LHP	Tim O'Conner	R/L	6 ft 1 in (1.85 m)	210 lb (95 kg)	Jr	Worcester, Massachusetts
40	RHP	Gus Collins	R/R	6 ft 4 in (1.93 m)	224 lb (102 kg)	Jr	Pryor, Oklahoma
41	RHP	Andrew Cossio	R/R	6 ft 0 in (1.83 m)	187 lb (85 kg)	Sr	Spring, Texas
43	RHP	Will Reed	R/R	6 ft 0 in (1.83 m)	175 lb (79 kg)	Jr	Prairieville, Louisiana
45	RHP	Dawson Flowers	R/R	6 ft 4 in (1.93 m)	210 lb (95 kg)	Jr	Brookhaven, Mississippi
48	OF	Reese Lipoma	R/R	5 ft 10 in (1.78 m)	175 lb (79 kg)	So	Gonzales, Louisiana
54	OF	Jeffrey Elkins	R/R	5 ft 10 in (1.78 m)	175 lb (79 kg)	Sr	Lafayette, Louisiana

Head coach

Bobby Barbier (Northwestern State)

Assistant coach(es)

Chris Bertrand (LSU–Shreveport)
Spencer Goodwin (Northwestern State)
Dan Hlad (Northwestern State)

Legend

- (C) Team captain
- (S) Suspended
- (I) Ineligible
- Injured
- Current redshirt

Roster
Last update: 11 July 2023

== Schedule and results ==
Legend
	Northwestern State win
	Northwestern State loss
	Postponement/Cancelation/Suspensions
**Bold**	Northwestern State team member
*	Non-Conference game
†	Make-Up Game

2023 Northwestern State Demons baseball game log
Regular season (29–27)

February (4–4)
Date	Opponent	Rank	Site/stadium	Score	Win	Loss	Save	TV	Attendance	Overall record	SLC Record
Jaguar Classic
Feb. 17	at South Alabama*		Eddie Stanky Field • Mobile, AL	2–3	DeLano (1-0)	**Flowers, Dawson (0-1)**	Wood (1)		1,217	0–1	
Feb. 18	vs. UAB*		Eddie Stanky Field • Mobile, AL	3–4	J. Smith (1-0)	**Collins, Gus (0-1)**	B. Abernathy (1)			0–2	
Feb. 19	vs. Eastern Kentucky*		Eddie Stanky Field • Mobile, AL	1–11	BLANTON, B. (1-0)	**Brown, Drayton (0-1)**	KALANDROS (1)			0–3	
Feb. 21	LSU–Alexandria*		H. Alvin Brown–C. C. Stroud Field • Natchitoches, LA	5–4	**Froehlich, Kyle (1-0)**	Solis Jr. Rene (0-0)	**Collins, Gus (1)**	ESPN+	894	1–3	
Sugar Land Space Cowboys College Classic
Feb. 24	vs. Seton Hall*		Constellation Field • Sugar Land, TX	6–1	**Carver, Cal (1-0)**	O'Neill (0-1)				2–3	
Feb. 25	vs. New Mexico State*		Constellation Field • Sugar Land, TX	7–3	**Alex Makarewich (1-0)**	Tyler Hoeft (0-1)	**Kyle Froehlich (1)**			3–3	
Feb. 26	vs. Stephen F. Austin*		Constellation Field • Sugar Land, TX	4–5	Castilaw (1-0)	**Flowers, Dawson (0-2)**	Jaco (1)			3–4	
Feb. 28	Stephen F. Austin*		H. Alvin Brown–C. C. Stroud Field • Natchitoches, LA	13–2 (8 inn)	P**restwich, Chase (1-0)**	Hines (0-1)			678	4–4	

March (10–7)
Date	Opponent	Rank	Site/stadium	Score	Win	Loss	Save	TV	Attendance	Overall record	SLC Record
Mar. 3	UT Arlington*		H. Alvin Brown–C. C. Stroud Field • Natchitoches, LA	4–5	Starks, Gabe (1-0)	**Carver, Cal (1-1)**	Peters, Connery (2)	ESPN+	749	4–5	
Mar. 4	UT Arlington*		H. Alvin Brown–C. C. Stroud Field • Natchitoches, LA	11–10	**Froehlich, Kyle (2-0)**	Kuykendall, Thomas (0-2)		ESPN+	811	5–5	
Mar. 5	UT Arlington*		H. Alvin Brown–C. C. Stroud Field • Natchitoches, LA	2–5	Novis, Matt (1-1)	**Brown, Drayton (0-2)**	Peters, Connery (3)	ESPN+	676	5–6	
Mar. 8	Louisiana–Monroe*		Warhawk Field • Monroe, LA	3–1	**Prestwich, Chase (2-0)**	Corley, Brandt (0-2)	**Froehlich, Kyle (2)**		512	6–6	
Mar. 10	Alabama A&M*		H. Alvin Brown–C. C. Stroud Field • Natchitoches, LA	7–0	**Carver, Cal (2-1)**	Jackson Hall (1-1)		ESPN+	813	7–6	
Mar. 11	Alabama A&M*		H. Alvin Brown–C. C. Stroud Field • Natchitoches, LA	10–0	**Makarewich, Alex (2-0)**	Evan Crenshaw (2-1)		ESPN+	757	8–6	
Mar. 12	Alabama A&M*		H. Alvin Brown–C. C. Stroud Field • Natchitoches, LA	8–5	**Brown, Drayton (1-2)**	Anthony Mateo (0-2)	**Froehlich, Kyle (3)**	ESPN+	723	9–6	
Mar. 14	Louisiana–Monroe*		H. Alvin Brown–C. C. Stroud Field • Natchitoches, LA	6–2	**Prestwich, Chase (3-0)**	Huff, H (1-1)		ESPN+	687	10–6	
Mar. 17	Little Rock*		H. Alvin Brown–C. C. Stroud Field • Natchitoches, LA	9–4	**Carver, Cal (3-1)**	BREWER, Hoss (1-1)		ESPN+	543	11–6	
Mar. 18	Little Rock*		H. Alvin Brown–C. C. Stroud Field • Natchitoches, LA	5–0	**Prestwich, Chase (4-0)**	WELLS, Jackson (2-1)		ESPN+	422	12–6	
Mar. 19	Little Rock*		H. Alvin Brown–C. C. Stroud Field • Natchitoches, LA	6–8	DAVIS, Preston (2-1)	**Brown, Drayton (1-3)**		ESPN+	723	12–7	
Mar. 21	LSU–Alexandria*		H. Alvin Brown–C. C. Stroud Field • Natchitoches, LA	12–3	**Francis, Ethan (1-0)**	Daigle, Cameron (0-0)		ESPN+	611	13–7	
Mar. 24	at Oregon*		PK Park • Eugene, OR	1–16	Stoffal, J (2-2)	**Carver, Cal (3-2)**			1,081	13–8	
Mar. 25	at Oregon*		PK Park • Eugene, OR	7–12	Mercado, L (2-0)	Makarewich, Alex (2-1)			1,146	13–9	
Mar. 25	at Oregon*		PK Park • Eugene, OR	3–13	Uelmen, L (2-2)	**Prestwich, Chase (4-1)**	Grinsell, G (1)		1,146	13–10	
Mar. 26	at Oregon*		PK Park • Eugene, OR	0–5	Dallas, M (3-0)	**Brown, Drayton (1-4)**			1,182	13–11	
Mar. 31	at New Orleans		Maestri Field at Privateer Park • New Orleans, LA	11–8	**Carver, Cal (4-2)**	LeBlanc, Tyler (2-3)	**Froehlich, Kyle (4)**	ESPN+		14–11	1–0

April (9–7)
Date	Opponent	Rank	Site/stadium	Score	Win	Loss	Save	TV	Attendance	Overall record	SLC Record
Apr. 1	at New Orleans		Maestri Field at Privateer Park • New Orleans, LA	2–10	Mitchell, Brandon (5-2)	**Makarewich, Alex (2-2)**		ESPN+	367	14–12	1–1
Apr. 2	at New Orleans		Maestri Field at Privateer Park • New Orleans, LA	4–1	**Brown, Drayton (2-4)**	Mercer, Colton (2-2)	**Prestwich, Chase (1)**	ESPN+	375	15–12	2–1
Apr. 4	Louisiana Tech*		H. Alvin Brown–C. C. Stroud Field • Natchitoches, LA	8–7 (13 inn)	**Talley, Corbin (1-0)**	BATES, Ethan (2-1)		ESPN+	1,027	16–12	
Apr. 7	Lamar		H. Alvin Brown–C. C. Stroud Field • Natchitoches, LA	13–5	**Flowers, Dawson (1-2)**	Ellis, Jacob (2-1)		ESPN+	621	17–12	3–1
Apr. 8	Lamar		H. Alvin Brown–C. C. Stroud Field • Natchitoches, LA	7–9	Caple, Brooks (3-0)	**Makarewich, Alex (2-3)**	Cleveland, Jackson (6)	ESPN+		17–13	3–2
Apr. 8	Lamar		H. Alvin Brown–C. C. Stroud Field • Natchitoches, LA	6–5	**Froehlich, Kyle (3-0)**	Morse, Trhea (1-3)		ESPN+	719	18–13	4–2
Apr. 11	at Stephen F. Austin*		Jaycees Field • Nacogdoches, TX	Cancelled							
Apr. 14	at Houston Christian		Husky Field • Houston, TX	13–14	Smitherman, Javan (1-1)	**Froehlich, Kyle (3-1)**	Austin, Morris (1)		150	18–14	4–3
Apr. 16	at Houston Christian		Constellation Field • Sugar Land, TX	7–14	Gunter, Rye (1-2)	**Brown, Drayton (2-5)**			200	18–15	4–4
Apr. 16	at Houston Christian		Constellation Field • Sugar Land, TX	16–5 (7 inn)	**Cossio, Andrew (1-1)**	Ripoli, Will (0-2)		ESPN+	200	19–15	5–4
Apr. 21	Incarnate Word		H. Alvin Brown–C. C. Stroud Field • Natchitoches, LA	5–11 (10 inn)	Hayward, Steve (5-3)	**Prestwich, Chase (4-2)**		ESPN+	673	19–16	5–5
Apr. 22	Incarnate Word		H. Alvin Brown–C. C. Stroud Field • Natchitoches, LA	10–4	**Makarewich, Alex (4-3)**	Zavala, Isaiah (6-1)		ESPN+	915	20–16	6–5
Apr. 23	Incarnate Word		H. Alvin Brown–C. C. Stroud Field • Natchitoches, LA	10–0 (8 inn)	**Brown, Drayton (3-5)**	Berens, Micah (2-2)		ESPN+	769	21–16	7–5
Apr. 26	at Louisiana*		M. L. Tigue Moore Field at Russo Park • Lafayette, LA	3–15	Jackson Nezuh (6-3)	**Prestwich, Chase (4-3)**		ESPN+	3,841	21–17	
Apr. 28	Nicholls		H. Alvin Brown–C. C. Stroud Field • Natchitoches, LA	4–2	**Carver, Cal (5-2)**	Desandro, Devin (2-4)	**Froehlich, Kyle (5)**	ESPN+	912	22–17	8–5
Apr. 29	Nicholls		H. Alvin Brown–C. C. Stroud Field • Natchitoches, LA	7–4	**Makarewich, Alex (5-3)**	Quevedo, Michael (3-1)	**Froehlich, Kyle (6)**	ESPN+	878	23–17	9–5
Apr. 30	Nicholls		H. Alvin Brown–C. C. Stroud Field • Natchitoches, LA	5–9	Mayers, Jacob (6-1)	**Brown, Drayton (3-6)**		ESPN+	853	23–18	9–6

May (4–7)
Date	Opponent	Rank	Site/stadium	Score	Win	Loss	Save	TV	Attendance	Overall record	SLC Record
May 2	at Louisiana Tech*		J. C. Love Field at Pat Patterson Park • Ruston, LA	10–7 (11 inn)	**Froehlich, Kyle (4-1)**	BATES, Ethan (3-2)		CUSAtv	2,171	24–18	
May 5	at Texas A&M–Corpus Christi		Chapman Field • Corpus Christi, TX	8–11	Watson, Matthew (5-3)	**Carver, Cal (5-3)**		ESPN+	327	24–19	9–7
May 6	at Texas A&M–Corpus Christi		Chapman Field • Corpus Christi, TX	1–4	Purcell, Colin (4-5)	**Makarewich, Alex (5-4)**	Garcia, Zach (1)	ESPN+	340	24–20	9–8
May 7	at Texas A&M–Corpus Christi		Chapman Field • Corpus Christi, TX	17–8	**Brown, Drayton (4-6)**	Dean, Austin (2-2)		ESPN+	287	25–20	10–8
May 9	at LSU*	2	Alex Box Stadium, Skip Bertman Field • Baton Rouge, LA	4–14	Thatcher Hurd (3-1)	(-)	**Francis, Ethan (1-1)**	SECN+	10,262	25–21	
May 12	McNeese		H. Alvin Brown–C. C. Stroud Field • Natchitoches, LA	5–2	**Carver, Cal (6-3)**	Rogers, Grant (10-1)	**Froehlich, Kyle (7)**	ESPN+	732	26–21	11–8
May 13	McNeese		H. Alvin Brown–C. C. Stroud Field • Natchitoches, LA	2–4	Abraham, Ty (2-2)	**Prestwich, Chase (4-4)**	Barthelemy, Brock (2)	ESPN+	308	26–22	11–9
May 14	McNeese		H. Alvin Brown–C. C. Stroud Field • Natchitoches, LA	8–4	**Brown, Drayton (5-6)**	Jones, Burrell (4-3)		ESPN+	328	27–22	12–9
May 18	at Southeastern Louisiana		Pat Kenelly Diamond at Alumni Field • Hammond, LA	5–6	Lauve, Lance (3-3)	**Froehlich, Kyle (4-2)**		ESPN+	1,242	27–23	12–10
May 19	at Southeastern Louisiana		Pat Kenelly Diamond at Alumni Field • Hammond, LA	5–7	Guth, Adam (1-1)	**Flowers, Dawson (1-3)**	Spencer, Connor (3)	ESPN+	1,313	27–24	12–11
May 20	at Southeastern Louisiana		Pat Kenelly Diamond at Alumni Field • Hammond, LA	6–7	Reynolds, Reid (2-0)	**Froehlich, Kyle (4-3)**		ESPN+	1,108	27–25	12–12

Post-season (2–2)

Southland Tournament (2–2)
Date	Opponent	(Seed)/Rank	Site/stadium	Score	Win	Loss	Save	TV	Attendance	Overall record	Tournament record
May 24	vs. (2) Incarnate Word	(5)	Joe Miller Ballpark • Lake Charles, LA	2–1	**Carver, Cal (7-3)**	Cassidy, Kayden (3-3)	**Prestwich, Chase (2)**	ESPN+		28–25	1–0
May 25	vs. (4) New Orleans	(5)	Joe Miller Ballpark • Lake Charles, LA	3–4	Seroski (4-1)	**Makarewich, Alex (5-5)**	N. Daniel (1)	ESPN+	629	28–26	1–1
May 26	vs. (6) McNeese	(5)	Joe Miller Ballpark • Lake Charles, LA	6–2	**Brown, Drayton (6-6)**	Jones, Burrell (4-5)		ESPN+		29–26	2–1
May 26	vs. (4) New Orleans	(5)	Joe Miller Ballpark • Lake Charles, LA	7–3	Horton, Collin (3-4)	Cossio, Andrew (0-1)		ESPN+	633	29–27	2–2

Schedule source:

*Rankings are based on the team's current ranking in the D1Baseball poll.
