= 2023 Southeastern Louisiana Lions baseball team =

NCAA Division I baseball season

2023 Southeastern Louisiana Lions baseball
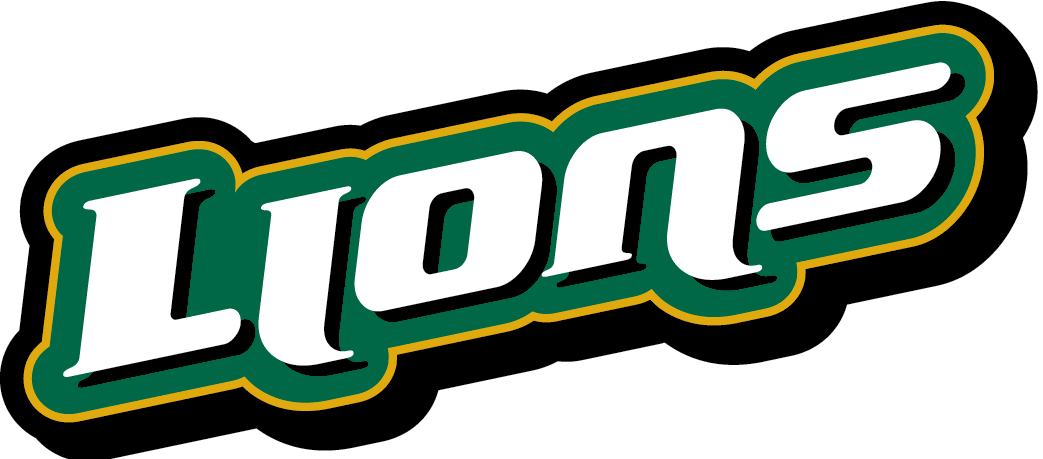
- Conference: Southland Conference
- Record: 25–25 (9–14 Southland)
- Head coach: Matt Riser (10th season)
- Assistant coaches: Ford Pemberton; Gerry Salisbury; Derrick Mount
- Home stadium: Pat Kenelly Diamond at Alumni Field

2023 Southland Conference baseball standings
	Conf.				Overall
Team	W		L	PCT	W		L	PCT
Nicholls ‍†‍‡‍^{y}	15	–	9	.625	34	–	24	.586
Incarnate Word ‍‍‍	14	–	10	.583	28	–	26	.519
New Orleans ‍‍‍	13	–	11	.542	36	–	24	.600
Lamar ‍‍‍	13	–	11	.542	32	–	23	.582
McNeese ‍‍‍	12	–	12	.500	35	–	23	.603
Northwestern State ‍‍‍	12	–	12	.500	29	–	27	.518
Texas A&M–Corpus Christi ‍‍‍	12	–	12	.500	24	–	30	.444
Southeastern Louisiana ‍‍‍	9	–	14	.391	25	–	25	.500
Houston Christian ‍‍‍	7	–	16	.304	11	–	37	.229
† – Conference champion ‡ – Tournament champion y – Invited to the NCAA Tournament; As of June 3, 2023; Rankings from D1Baseball

The 2023 Southeastern Louisiana Lions baseball team represented Southeastern Louisiana University during the 2023 NCAA Division I baseball season. The Lions played their home games at Pat Kenelly Diamond at Alumni Field were led by tenth–year head coach Matt Riser. They are members of the Southland Conference.

== Preseason ==
=== Southland Conference Coaches Poll ===
The Southland Conference Coaches Poll was released on February 3, 2023. Southeastern Louisiana was picked to finish second in the Southland Conference with 115 votes and 10 first place votes.

Coaches poll
Predicted finish	Team	Votes (1st place)
1	McNeese State	118 (7)
2	Southeastern Louisiana	115 (10)
3	Lamar	88
4	New Orleans	87
5	Northwestern State	65 (1)
6	Nicholls	59
7	Texas A&M–Corpus Christi	55
8	Houston Christian	41
9	Incarnate Word	20

=== Preseason All-Southland team ===
Three Southeastern Louisiana players were named to the conference preseason second team.

==== First Team ====
- Edgar Alvarez (NICH, JR, 1st Base)
- Brad Burckel (MCNS, SR, 2nd Base)
- Josh Leslie (MCNS, SR, 3rd Base)
- Parker Coddou (NICH, JR, Shortstop)
- Bo Willis (NWST, JR, Catcher)
- Tre Jones (TAMUCC, JR, Designated Hitter)
- Payton Harden (MCNS, SR, Outfielder)
- Brendan Ryan (TAMUCC, SR, Outfielder)
- Xane Washington (NICH, R-SR, Outfielder)
- Zach Garcia (TAMUCC, SO, Starting Pitcher)
- Grant Rogers (MCNS, JR, Starting Pitcher)
- Tyler Theriot (NICH, SR, Starting Pitcher)
- Burrell Jones (MCNS, SR, Relief Pitcher)
- Alec Carr (UIW, SR, Utility)

==== Second Team ====
- Josh Blankenship (LU, SR, 1st Base)
- Daunte Stuart (NWST, JR, 2nd Base)
- Kasten Furr (NO, JR, 3rd Base)
- Tyler Bischke (NO, JR, Shortstop)
- Bryce Grizzaffi (SELA, SR, Catcher)
- Kade Hunter (MCNS, SR, Designated Hitter)
- Josh Caraway (TAMUCC, JR, Outfielder)
- Braden Duhon (MCNS, JR, Outfielder)
- Issac Williams (NO, JR, Outfielder)
- Cal Carver (NWST, SR, Starting Pitcher)
- Tyler LeBlanc (NO, JR, Starting Pitcher)
- Will Kinzeler (SELA, JR, Starting Pitcher)
- Dalton Aspholm (SELA, SR, Relief Pitcher)
- Tre’ Obregon III (MCNS, SR, Utility)

== Personnel ==
2023 Southeastern Louisiana Lions baseball team
Players
Coaches

#	Pos.	Name	B/T	Height	Weight	Year	Home town
1	C	Bryce Grizzaffi	R/R	5 ft 10 in (1.78 m)	175 lb (79 kg)	Sr	Morgan City, Louisiana
2	OF	Tyler Finke	R/R	5 ft 11 in (1.8 m)	165 lb (75 kg)		Columbus, Indiana
3	OF	Dane Watts	L/L	5 ft 8 in (1.73 m)	152 lb (69 kg)	Fr	Hammond, Louisiana
4	INF	Champ Artigues (redshirt)	L/R	5 ft 9 in (1.75 m)	175 lb (79 kg)	Sr	Hammond, Louisiana
5	RHP	Carson Robb	R/R	6 ft 2 in (1.88 m)	193 lb (88 kg)	Fr	Vancleave, Mississippi
6	RHP	Levi Bennett	R/R	5 ft 11 in (1.8 m)	165 lb (75 kg)	Jr	Bella Vista, Arkansas
7	RHP	Brennan Stuprich (redshirt)	R/R	5 ft 10 in (1.78 m)	205 lb (93 kg)	So	Kenner, Louisiana
8	OF	Joe Delaney	R/R	5 ft 8 in (1.73 m)	150 lb (68 kg)	Jr	Destrehan, Louisiana
9	OF	Christian Garcia	R/R	5 ft 11 in (1.8 m)	175 lb (79 kg)	Sr	Slidell, Louisiana
10	RHP	Jack Walker	R/R	6 ft 0 in (1.83 m)	190 lb (86 kg)	So	Lake Charles, Louisiana
11	RHP	Mason Creacy	R/R	6 ft 0 in (1.83 m)	197 lb (89 kg)	Jr	Willis, Texas
12	OF	Clay Cook	R/R	5 ft 11 in (1.8 m)	170 lb (77 kg)	Sr	Mize, Mississippi
13	INF	Trey Harrington	R/R	6 ft 2 in (1.88 m)	176 lb (80 kg)	Gr	Lakeland, Tennessee
14	INF	Logan Shurden (redshirt)	L/R	5 ft 7 in (1.7 m)	160 lb (73 kg)	Fr	West Monroe, Louisiana
15	INF	TJ Salvaggio	R/R	6 ft 2 in (1.88 m)	170 lb (77 kg)	So	Slidell, Louisiana
16	INF	Rhett Rosevear	L/R	5 ft 10 in (1.78 m)	170 lb (77 kg)	Jr	Denham Springs, Louisiana
18	C	Connor Manola	R/R	6 ft 0 in (1.83 m)	180 lb (82 kg)	Gr	Port Allen, Louisiana
19	RHP	Aaron Hosack	R/R	6 ft 5 in (1.96 m)	230 lb (104 kg)	Jr	Shidler, Oklahoma
21	RHP	Jimmie Johnson	R/R	6 ft 1 in (1.85 m)	165 lb (75 kg)	Fr	Zachary, Louisiana
22	INF	Ethan Moore (redshirt)	R/R	6 ft 1 in (1.85 m)	210 lb (95 kg)	Jr	Beaver, Pennsylvania
23	INF	Pierce Leavengood	L/R	6 ft 3 in (1.91 m)	220 lb (100 kg)	Sr	Snohomish, Washington
24	RHP	Andrew Landry	R/R	6 ft 1 in (1.85 m)	175 lb (79 kg)	Jr	Slidell, Louisiana
25	RHP	Dakota Lee	R/R	6 ft 3 in (1.91 m)	190 lb (86 kg)	Jr	Purvis, Mississippi
26	RHP	Hunter O'Toole	R/R	6 ft 2 in (1.88 m)	200 lb (91 kg)		Arkansas City, Kansas
27	RHP	Dalton Aspholm	R/R	6 ft 0 in (1.83 m)	190 lb (86 kg)	Sr	Baton Rouge, Louisiana
28	UTL	Jake Killingsworth	R/R	5 ft 10 in (1.78 m)	215 lb (98 kg)	Jr	Headland, Alabama
29	RHP	Will Kinzeler	L/R	6 ft 5 in (1.96 m)	180 lb (82 kg)	Jr	Covington, Louisiana
30	INF	Shea Thomas	R/R	6 ft 3 in (1.91 m)	190 lb (86 kg)	Sr	Olympia, Washington
32	RHP	Lance Lauve	R/R	5 ft 11 in (1.8 m)	203 lb (92 kg)	So	Madisonville, Louisiana
34	LHP	Jay Long (redshirt)	L/L	6 ft 3 in (1.91 m)	210 lb (95 kg)	Jr	Stillwell, Kansas
35	RHP	Jacob Sherer (redshirt)	R/R	6 ft 3 in (1.91 m)	215 lb (98 kg)	Jr	Mandeville, Louisiana
36	LHP	Jackson Rodriguez	R/L	6 ft 0 in (1.83 m)	175 lb (79 kg)	Jr	Kingwood, Texas
37	RHP	Hayden Robb (redshirt)	R/R	6 ft 2 in (1.88 m)	200 lb (91 kg)	Sr	Vancleave, Mississippi
38	RHP	Reid Reynolds	R/R	6 ft 1 in (1.85 m)	175 lb (79 kg)	Sr	Heidelberg, Mississippi
39	C	Michael Curry	R/R	5 ft 11 in (1.8 m)	175 lb (79 kg)	So	Brusly, Louisiana
40	INF	Lakin Polk	L/R	6 ft 3 in (1.91 m)	215 lb (98 kg)	Fr	Ponchatoula, Louisiana
41	C	Ethan Butler (redshirt)	R/R	6 ft 1 in (1.85 m)	195 lb (88 kg)	Fr	Baton Rouge, Louisiana
42	RHP	Ryan Peters (redshirt)	R/R	6 ft 2 in (1.88 m)	190 lb (86 kg)	So	Cypress, Texas
43	INF	McGwire Turner	R/R	6 ft 2 in (1.88 m)	210 lb (95 kg)	Fr	Helena, Alabama
44	LHP	Adam Guth	R/L	6 ft 5 in (1.96 m)	225 lb (102 kg)	So	Lake Charles, Louisiana
45	RHP	Connor Spencer (redshirt)	L/R	6 ft 2 in (1.88 m)	224 lb (102 kg)	Jr	Hernando, Mississippi
46	LHP	Larson Fabre	R/L	6 ft 0 in (1.83 m)	175 lb (79 kg)	Fr	Denham Springs, Louisiana
	OF	Dom Regira	L/R	6 ft 1 in (1.85 m)	175 lb (79 kg)	Fr	Gonzales, Louisiana
	RHP	Triston Todorowski	R/R	6 ft 0 in (1.83 m)	190 lb (86 kg)	Jr	Toledo, Ohio

Head coach

Matt Riser (Tulane)

Assistant coach(es)

Ford Pemberton (Arkansas State)
Gerry Salisbury (Ohio)
Derrick Mount (Southeastern Louisiana)

Legend

- (C) Team captain
- (S) Suspended
- (I) Ineligible
- Injured
- Current redshirt

Roster
Last update: 10 March 2023

== Schedule and results ==
Legend
	Southeastern Louisiana win
	Southeastern Louisiana loss
	Postponement/Cancelation/Suspensions
**Bold**	Southeastern Louisiana team member
*	Non-Conference game
†	Make-Up Game

2023 Southeastern Louisiana Lions baseball game log
Regular season (25–25)

February (7–2)
Date	Opponent	Rank	Site/stadium	Score	Win	Loss	Save	TV	Attendance	Overall record	SLC Record
Feb. 17	Lafayette*		Pat Kenelly Diamond at Alumni Field • Hammond, LA	**W** 15–4	**Stuprich** (1-0)	Craytor (0-1)	None	ESPN+	1,236	1–0	
Feb. 18	Lafayette*		Pat Kenelly Diamond at Alumni Field • Hammond, LA	**W** 20–0	**Kinzeler** (1-0)	Bogosian (0-1)	None	ESPN+	1,236	2–0	
Feb. 18	Lafayette*		Pat Kenelly Diamond at Alumni Field • Hammond, LA	**W** 7–5	**Landry** (1-0)	Walsh (0-1)	**Aspholm** (1-0)	ESPN+	1,236	3–0	
Feb. 19	Lafayette*		Pat Kenelly Diamond at Alumni Field • Hammond, LA	**W** 11–4	**Lauve** (1-0)	Maurer (0-1)	None	ESPN+	1,272	4–0	
Feb. 21	at Jackson State*		Braddy Field • Jackson, MS	**W** 19–0	**Hosack, Aaron** (1-0)	Francis Thorne Jr. (0-1)	None		156	5–0	
Feb. 24	Samford*		Pat Kenelly Diamond at Alumni Field • Hammond, LA	**W** 6–5	**O'Toole, Hunter (1-0)**	Jacob Cravey (0-1)	**Aspholm, Dalton (2)**	ESPN+	1,241	6–0	
Feb. 25	Samford*		Pat Kenelly Diamond at Alumni Field • Hammond, LA	**W** 15–5	**Kinzeler** (2-0)	Holifield (0-1)	None	ESPN+	1,362	7–0	
Feb. 26	Samford*		Pat Kenelly Diamond at Alumni Field • Hammond, LA	**L** 3–9	Petschke (1-1)	**Landry** (1-1)	Hobbs, Carson (1)	ESPN+	1,189	7–1	
Feb. 27	St. Johns*		Pat Kenelly Diamond at Alumni Field • Hammond, LA	**L** 7–12	Johnson (1-0)	**Long** (0-1)	None	ESPN+	1,265	7–2	

March (9–8)
Date	Opponent	Rank	Site/stadium	Score	Win	Loss	Save	TV	Attendance	Overall record	SLC Record
Mar. 3	at Jacksonville		John Sessions Stadium • Jacksonville, FL	2–6	Evan Chrest (1-0)	**Stuprich, Brennan (1-1)**	None		302	7–3	
Mar. 4	at Jacksonville*		John Sessions Stadium • Jacksonville, FL	15–2	**Kinzeler, Will (3-0)**	Christian Graham (1-1)	None		216	8–3	
Mar. 5	at Jacksonville*		John Sessions Stadium • Jacksonville, FL	4–6	Chris Lotito (1-0)	**Aspholm, Dalton (0-1)**	None		246	8–4	
Mar. 8	at Alabama A&M*		Bulldog Field • Huntsville, AL	14–0	**Long, Jay (1-1)**	Jason Garcia (1-1)	None		200	9–4	
Mar. 10	at Auburn*	11	Plainsman Park • Auburn, AL	1–7	Carlson, Parker (1-0)	**Stuprich, Brennan (1-2)**	Armstrong, John (1)	None	3,072	9–5	
Mar. 11	at Auburn*	11	Plainsman Park • Auburn, AL	8–3	**Lauve, Lance (2-0)**	Isbell, Chase (1-1)	**Rodriguez, Jackson (1)**	SECN+	4,097	10–5	
Mar. 12	at Auburn*	11	Plainsman Park • Auburn, AL	8–7	**Landry, Andrew (2-1)**	Herberholz, Christian (0-1)	**Lauve, Lance (1)**	SECN+	2,875	11–5	
Mar. 14	Southern Miss*	25	Pat Kenelly Diamond at Alumni Field • Hammond, LA	1–8	Oldham, Billy (2-0)	**Long, Jay (1-2)**	None	ESPN+	2,147	11–6	
Mar. 17	Memphis*		Pat Kenelly Diamond at Alumni Field • Hammond, LA	3–4	DURHAM, JT (2-1)	**Hosack, Aaron (1-1)**	KENDRICK, DALTON (5)	ESPN+	1,117	11–7	
Mar. 18	Memphis*		Pat Kenelly Diamond at Alumni Field • Hammond, LA	6–1	**Kinzeler, Will (4-0)**	FOWLER, DALTON (1-3)	None	ESPN+	1,007	12–7	
Mar. 19	Memphis*		Pat Kenelly Diamond at Alumni Field • Hammond, LA	2–8	GARNER, SETH (1-2)	**Landry, Andrew (2-2)**	KENDRICK, DALTON (6)	ESPN+	1,103	12–8	
Mar. 22	Louisiana*		M. L. Tigue Moore Field at Russo Park • Lafayette, LA	0–2	Rawls (5-0)	**Long, Jay (1-3)**	Moody (2)	ESPN+	3,786	12–9	
Mar. 24	at Texas A&M–Corpus Christi		Chapman Field • Corpus Christi, TX	10–4	**Stuprich, Brennan (2-2)**	Thomas, Hayden (3-3)	None	ESPN+	346	13–9	1–0
Mar. 25	at Texas A&M–Corpus Christi		Chapman Field • Corpus Christi, TX	7–5	**Reynolds, Reid (1-0)**	Purcell, Colin (2-1)	**Lauve, Lance (2)**	ESPN+	321	14–9	2–0
Mar. 26	at Texas A&M–Corpus Christi		Chapman Field • Corpus Christi, TX	1–3	Ramirez Jr., Jaime (1-2)	**Landry, Andrew (2-3)**	Dean, Austin (2)	ESPN+	319	14–10	2–1
Mar. 28	at South Alabama*	Postponed – New date TBD									
Mar. 29	Mississippi Valley State*		Pat Kenelly Diamond at Alumni Field • Hammond, LA	2–1 (10 inn)	**O'Toole, Hunter (2-0)**	SNIPES, JAMES (0-2)	None	ESPN+	1,006	15–10	
Mar. 31	Incarnate Word		Pat Kenelly Diamond at Alumni Field • Hammond, LA	10–2	**Stuprich, Brennan (3-2)**	Cassidy, Kayden (1-2)	None	ESPN+	1,254	16–10	3–1

April (3–11)
Date	Opponent	Rank	Site/stadium	Score	Win	Loss	Save	TV	Attendance	Overall record	SLC Record
Apr. 1	Incarnate Word		Pat Kenelly Diamond at Alumni Field • Hammond, LA	2–5	Zavala, Isaiah (4-0)	**Kinzeler, Will (4-1)**	Hayward, Steve (2)	ESPN+	1,275	16–11	3–2
Apr. 2	Incarnate Word		Pat Kenelly Diamond at Alumni Field • Hammond, LA	1–11	Berens, Micah (2-0)	**Landry, Andrew (2-4)**	Rodriguez, Luis (1)	ESPN+	1,254	16–12	3–3
Apr. 4	at Southern Miss*		Pete Taylor Park • Hattiesburg, MS	6–10	Sivley, Kros (2-0)	**Aspholm, Dalton (0-2)**	None	ESPN+	5,232	16–13	
Ponchatrain Bowl
Apr. 6	at New Orleans		Maestri Field at Privateer Park • New Orleans, LA	0–10 (8 inn)	Seroski, Caleb (1-0)	**Stuprich, Brennan (3-3)**	None	ESPN+	312	16–14	3–4
Apr. 7	at New Orleans		Maestri Field at Privateer Park • New Orleans, LA	2–22 (7 inn)	Williams, Jack (1-0)	**Hosack, Aaron (1-2)**	None	ESPN+	312	16–15	3–5
Apr. 8	at New Orleans		Maestri Field at Privateer Park • New Orleans, LA	2–3	Mitchell, Brandon (6-2)	**Landry, Andrew (2-5)**	Mercer, Colton (1)	ESPN+	355	16–16	3–6
Apr. 12	Louisiana*	28	Pat Kenelly Diamond at Alumni Field • Hammond, LA	5–4	**Spencer, Connor (1-0)**	Steven Cash (0-1)	**Lauve, Lance (3)**	ESPN+	1,208	17–16	
Apr. 14	McNeese		Pat Kenelly Diamond at Alumni Field • Hammond, LA	6–7	Vega, Christian (3-2)	**Lauve, Lance (2-1)**	Abraham, Ty (3)	ESPN+	1,288	17–17	3–7
Apr. 15	McNeese		Pat Kenelly Diamond at Alumni Field • Hammond, LA	8–7	**Rodriguez, Jackson (1-0)**	Vega, Christian (3-3)	None	ESPN+	1,178	18–17	4–7
Apr. 16	McNeese		Pat Kenelly Diamond at Alumni Field • Hammond, LA	2–3	Lejeune, Cameron (2-1)	**Rodriguez, Jackson (1-1)**	None	ESPN+	1,263	18–18	4–8
Apr. 18	Jackson State*		Pat Kenelly Diamond at Alumni Field • Hammond, LA	14–4	**Walker, Jack (1-0)**	Erwins Branche (0-1)	None	ESPN+	1,017	19–18	
Apr. 28	Lamar		Pat Kenelly Diamond at Alumni Field • Hammond, LA	4–5	Caple, Brooks (4-0)	**Lauve, Lance (2-2)**	None	ESPN+	1,212	19–19	4–9
Apr. 29	Lamar		Pat Kenelly Diamond at Alumni Field • Hammond, LA	1–7	Hesseltine, Hunter (3-1)	**Landry, Andrew (2-6)**	None	ESPN+	1,178	19–20	4–10
Apr. 30	Lamar		Pat Kenelly Diamond at Alumni Field • Hammond, LA	4–12	Hail, Patrick (3-0)	**Stuprich, Brennan (3-4)**	None	ESPN+	1,098	19–21	4–11

May (6–4)
Date	Opponent	Rank	Site/stadium	Score	Win	Loss	Save	TV	Attendance	Overall record	SLC Record
May 2	LSU*		Pat Kenelly Diamond at Alumni Field • Hammond, LA	0–10 (7 inn)	Gavin Guidry (3-0)	**Guth, Adam (0-1)**	None	ESPN+	3,214	19–22	
May 5	at Nicholls		Ben Meyer Diamond at Ray E. Didier Field • Thibodaux, LA	7–13	Saltaformaggio, Nico (4-1)	**Aspholm, Dalton (0-3)**	None	ESPN+	847	19–23	4–12
May 7	at Nicholls		Ben Meyer Diamond at Ray E. Didier Field • Thibodaux, LA	5–6	Saltaformaggio, Nico (5-1)	**Lauve, Lance (2-3)**	None	ESPN+	554	19–24	4–13
May 7	at Nicholls		Ben Meyer Diamond at Ray E. Didier Field • Thibodaux, LA	0–9	Mayers, Jacob (7-1)	**Stuprich, Brennan (3-5)**	None	ESPN+	554	19–25	4–14
May 12	at Houston Christian		Reckling Park • Houston, TX	5–4	**Kinzeler, Will (5-1)**	Gunter, Rye (1-4)	Spencer, Connor (1)	ESPN+	200	20–25	5–14
May 12	at Houston Christian		Reckling Park • Houston, TX	9–5	**Stuprich, Brennan (4-5)**	Ricker, Chad (1-1)	**Guth, Adam (1)**	ESPN+	215	21–25	6–14
May 13	at Houston Christian		Husky Field • Houston, TX	Cancelled							
May 16	South Alabama*		Pat Kenelly Diamond at Alumni Field • Hammond, LA	5–4	**Rodriguez, Jackson (2-1)**	Willingham, Zach (2-2)	**Spencer, Connor (2)**	ESPN+	1,049	22–25	
May 18	Northwestern State		Pat Kenelly Diamond at Alumni Field • Hammond, LA	6–5	**Lauve, Lance (3-3)**	Froehlich, Kyle (4-2)	None	ESPN+	1,242	23–25	7–14
May 19	Northwestern State		Pat Kenelly Diamond at Alumni Field • Hammond, LA	7–5	**Guth, Adam (1-1)**	Flowers, Dawson (1-3)	**Spencer, Connor (3)**	ESPN+	1,313	24–25	8–14
May 20	Northwestern State		Pat Kenelly Diamond at Alumni Field • Hammond, LA	7–6	**Reynolds, Reid (2-0)**	Froehlich, Kyle (4-3)	None	ESPN+	1,108	25–25	9–14

Schedule source:

*Rankings are based on the team's current ranking in the D1Baseball poll. |}
