= Troy E. Brown =

American politician

Troy Earl Brown

Member of the Louisiana Senate from the 2nd district
- In office January 2012 – February 16, 2017
- Preceded by: Cynthia Willard-Lewis
- Succeeded by: Ed Price

Personal details
- Born: August 22, 1971 (age 55) Napoleonville, Louisiana, U.S.
- Party: Democratic
- Spouse: Toni B. Brown
- Children: Jatiea Brown; Jadeon Brown
- Education: Assumption High School; Southern University
- Occupation: Businessman
- Website: troybrownstatesenate.com

Troy Earl Brown (born August 22, 1971) is a Democratic former member of the Louisiana State Senate. From 2012 to 2017, when he resigned his seat in scandal, Brown represented District 2, which includes parts of Ascension, Assumption, Iberville, Lafourche, St. Charles, St. John the Baptist, St. James, and West Baton Rouge parishes.

== Background ==
Brown is from Napoleonville, in Assumption Parish, Louisiana, where he maintains his voter residence, but he also resides in Geismar in Ascension Parish near the capital city of Baton Rouge. He graduated from Assumption High School. Brown received his associate and bachelor's degrees from historically black Southern University in Baton Rouge, at which he majored in criminal justice. Brown also attended but did not graduate from Louisiana State University and the Southern University Law Center, both in Baton Rouge. He owns and works as the chief executive officer of Home-Health PCA, LLC, and Troy Brown Construction. He is a member of the Louisiana Association of Home Builders and the National Association of Home Builders.

== State Senate ==
On July 5, 2011, Brown announced his candidacy for the Louisiana State Senate. In 2007, he ran unsuccessfully for the Louisiana House of Representatives but lost by four percentage points. He served on the Senate Transportation, Highways and Public Works Committee, as well as the committees for Insurance and Select Vocational & Technical Education. He was the vice chairman of the Environmental Quality Committee.

As senator, Brown advocated for better pay and benefits for police, firefighters, and other emergency personnel.

== Family and personal life ==
Brown and his wife, Toni B. Brown, have two children: Jatiea and Jaedon. He and his family attend Saint Paul Baptist Church in Napoleonville.

== Assault ==
On November 28, 2015, Brown was arrested for allegedly having struck his long-time female companion, Katasha A. Willis, in the face. The incident happened after the Bayou Classic football game in New Orleans. The attack allegedly occurred while the woman, a resident of Labadieville in Assumption Parish, a "side friend" (his term) with whom he had been involved for a decade, was outside an elevator, along with other people, at the Hyatt Regency Hotel near the Mercedes-Benz Superdome. Brown and the woman had reportedly quarreled prior to the incident.

Brown was arrested and booked on November 29 into the Orleans Parish Prison on domestic abuse battery, a misdemeanor. Brown said that he had no recollection of the incident and sought medical help. He was represented by former State Senator Edwin R. Murray of New Orleans.

On January 8, 2016, Brown appeared in court in New Orleans to complete paperwork in the battery case against him. Attorney Ed Murray said that Brown could not remember hitting Ms. Willis because of a brain injury in his earlier years.

On July 17, 2016, Brown was arrested at his Geismar residence after biting his wife, Toni, his second domestic abuse arrest in a year. Brown told deputies of the Ascension Parish Sheriff's Office that because of the brain injury he had no recollection of biting his wife. Brown posted $5,000 in bail and was released the next day. Not long after this incident, Democratic Governor John Bel Edwards, called for Brown's resignation.

Prior to his resignation, Brown told an interviewer that it was his "gut feel" that "it's pretty obvious that the Senate is going to vote for expulsion. It is my hope that once it gets to the courts, and the courts see the various flaws that exist that are contrary to the Constitution that legal reason will prevail." His latest attorney, Jill Craft of Baton Rouge, referred to the Senate's consideration of expulsion as "a dog and pony show" without proper rules of legal fairness.

Brown's resignation in February 2017 avoided a vote by his colleagues on his proposed expulsion from the chamber. He had pleaded no contest twice in four months to misdemeanor charges related to domestic abuse. Brown said that he did not believe his Senate colleagues, the majority of whom are Republicans, would have given him a fair hearing had he sought to remain in office.

Democrats Warren Harang, III, a sugar cane farmer from Donaldsonville whose late father was a mayor of Thibodaux, and Ed Price, the District 58 member of the Louisiana House of Representatives from Gonzales, were the top finishers in a 13-candidate field to choose Brown's successor in the state Senate. The two squared off in a runoff contest on May 27, 2017. In a turnout of 20.2 percent of registered voters, Price handily trounced Harang in the second round of balloting, 9,224 (63 percent) to 5,507 (37 percent).

Louisiana State Senate
Preceded by Cynthia Willard-Lewis	Louisiana State Senator for District 2 (parts of Ascension, Assumption, Iberville, Lafourche, St. Charles, St. James, St. John the Baptist, and West Baton Rouge parishes); 2012 – 2017	Succeeded by Ed Price
