= Louisiana's 55th House of Representatives district =

American legislative district

Louisiana's 55th State House of Representatives district
Representative
| Bryan Fontenot; R–Thibodaux |

Louisiana's 55th House of Representatives district is one of 105 Louisiana House of Representatives districts. It is currently represented by Republican Bryan Fontenot of Thibodaux.

== Geography ==
HD55 includes a large part of the city of Thibodaux, and the census-designated place of Raceland.

== Election results ==
| Year | Winning candidate | Party | Percent | Opponent | Party | Percent |
|---|---|---|---|---|---|---|
| 2011 | Jerome Richard | Independent | 78% | Bobby Grabert | Republican | 22% |
| 2015 | Jerome Richard | Independent | 100% | | | |
| 2019 | Bryan Fontenot | Republican | 52.7% | Donovan Fremin | Republican | 47.3% |
| 2023 | Bryan Fontenot | Republican | 51.6% | Dirk Guidry | Republican | 48.4% |
