= Tee Joe Gonzales =

American politician and businessman

"Tee Joe" Gonzales
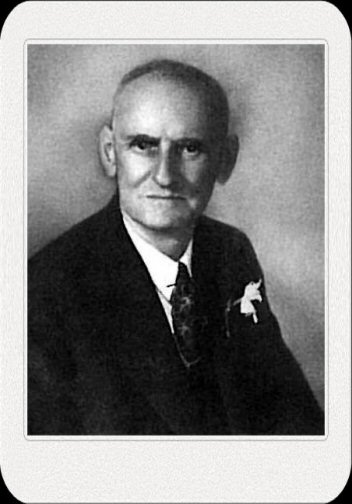
- Joseph "Tee Joe" Gonzales

Mayor of Gonzales, Louisiana
- In office 1922/1928–1936

Personal details
- Born: Joseph Stonewall Gonzales; September 11, 1862 Ascension Parish, Louisiana, Confederate States of America
- Died: April 20, 1940 (aged 77) Gonzales, Louisiana, United States of America
- Profession: Politician and businessman

Joseph Stonewall "Tee Joe" Gonzales (September 11, 1862 – April 20, 1940), was an American politician and businessman. He served as the first Mayor of modern Gonzales, Louisiana, serving between 1922 (when the city got the status of village) and 1936. In 1887 Gonzales founded the first post office of the city, the Gonzales Post Office. This post office gives its name to the city.

== Family ==
Joseph "Tee Joe" Gonzales was born in Ascension Parish, Louisiana. He was the son of "Big" Joseph M. Gonzales (May 28, 1835, St. Amant, Louisiana – December 21, 1897) and Mrs Adorea Marchand Gonzales (?−1890). His father was a soldier (serving in the Confederate Army from June 10, 1862, along with his brother, John Alfred Gonzales), Captain of the New River Rangers, police chief (from 1866), and sheriff of the village (1886).

Joseph M. Gonzales was a descendant of Spanish settlers from the Canary Islands, who settled in Louisiana between 1778 and 1782. Settlers in Louisiana from the Canaries are known as Isleños.

== Career ==
In 1887, Gonzales opened a small shop in modern-day Gonzales and established its first post office, which was known as the Gonzales Post Office, and subsequently became first postmaster.

For this reason, a few years later, the Railroad Commission decided to change the name of the area from Edenborn to Gonzales, to match the post office name, and ordered the local railroad to change the name also. (Note: Anyway, some time later, the railroad company wanted to change the name of the village back to Edenborn. But the villagers fought to keep the name of "Gonzales". The battle lasted many years until, in 1910, the villagers won and the town retained the old name.)

Tee Joe Gonzales subdivided the village in April 1906 and was elected mayor of Gonzales City in 1922 (or 1928, according to other source), becoming the first mayor of the village.

Tee Joe ran the family business out of his little home, situated on the main street. He and his brother bought land and sold it as smaller plots, and he encouraged policies that caused the growth of their namesake town of Gonzales.

Tee Joe Gonzales retired as mayor of Gonzales in 1936, having been in office longer than any of the next seven mayors. Today, he is considered the best mayor in the city's history.

Joseph Gonzales died in Gonzales on April 20, 1940, and he was buried in the town's Saint Theresa of Avila Catholic Cemetery.

== Personal life ==
He married Marie Felicite Bourgeois Gonzales (1861–1949). The former mayor of Gonzales, Johnny Berthelot (who governed Gonzales from 1984 until 2008), is the great-nephew of Gonzales.

== Legacy ==
- The city he lived in was named "Gonzales" after him.
- The Tee Joe Gonzales Museum is a museum opened to honor Tee-Joe and the Gonzales town in Gonzales, Louisiana. The museum was established in the little cottage he built on the banks of New River around 1910.
