= Louisiana's 57th House of Representatives district =

American legislative district

Louisiana's 57th State House of Representatives district
Representative
Sylvia Elaine Taylor; D–Laplace

Louisiana's 57th House of Representatives district is one of 105 Louisiana House of Representatives districts. It is currently represented by Democrat Sylvia Elaine Taylor of Laplace. It was formerly represented by the current chair of the Louisiana Democratic Party, Randal Gaines.

== Geography ==
HD56 represents the census-designated places of Edgard and Laplace. The district stretches to the point of Lake Maurepas.

== Election results ==
Year	Winning candidate	Party	Percent	Opponent	Party	Percent
2011	Randal Gaines	Democratic	69%	Russ Wise	Independent	31%
2015	Randal Gaines	Democratic	100%			
2019	Randal Gaines	Democratic	100%			
2023	Sylvia Elaine Taylor	Democratic	65.2%	Russ Wise	Independent	34.8%
