= 2023 Lamar Cardinals baseball team =

American college baseball season

2023 Lamar Cardinals baseball
- Conference: Southland Conference
- Record: 32–23 (13–11 SLC)
- Head coach: Will Davis (7th season)
- Assistant coaches: Scott Hatten; Sean Snedeker; Tod McDowell
- Home stadium: Vincent–Beck Stadium

2023 Southland Conference baseball standings
	Conf.				Overall
Team	W		L	PCT	W		L	PCT
Nicholls ‍†‍‡‍^{y}	15	–	9	.625	34	–	24	.586
Incarnate Word ‍‍‍	14	–	10	.583	28	–	26	.519
New Orleans ‍‍‍	13	–	11	.542	36	–	24	.600
Lamar ‍‍‍	13	–	11	.542	32	–	23	.582
McNeese ‍‍‍	12	–	12	.500	35	–	23	.603
Northwestern State ‍‍‍	12	–	12	.500	29	–	27	.518
Texas A&M–Corpus Christi ‍‍‍	12	–	12	.500	24	–	30	.444
Southeastern Louisiana ‍‍‍	9	–	14	.391	25	–	25	.500
Houston Christian ‍‍‍	7	–	16	.304	11	–	37	.229
† – Conference champion ‡ – Tournament champion y – Invited to the NCAA Tournament; As of June 3, 2023; Rankings from D1Baseball

The 2023 Lamar Cardinals baseball team represented Lamar University during the 2023 NCAA Division I baseball season. The Cardinals played their home games at Vincent–Beck Stadium and were led by seventh–year head coach Will Davis. They returned as members of the Southland Conference following one year as members of the Western Athletic Conference.

The Cardinals had a regular season record of 32–23 and a conference record of 13–11 finishing in third place in SLC play. They participated in the 2023 Southland Conference baseball tournament as the third seeded team. The Cardinals were 0-2 in the conference tournament losing to fourth seeded New Orleans 1–4 and first seeded Nicholls 0–4.

== Previous season ==
The Cardinals had a regular season record of 37–21 and a conference record of 20–10 finishing in second place in the WAC Southwest division, one game behind division winner Sam Houston. They participated in the 2022 Western Athletic Conference baseball tournament as the second seeded team from the Southwest Division. After winning their first conference tournament game against Seattle, the Cardinals' season ended after losing to West Division first seed Grand Canyon and Southwest Division fourth seed Abilene Christian.

== Preseason ==
=== New Players ===
On August 25, 2022, Lamar announced that twenty-nine new players would join the team for the 2023 season.

Player	Position	Hometown	Previous Team
NCAA Division I Transfers
Brooks Caple	RHP	Gunter, Texas	Stephen F. Austin
Kanin Dodge	Infielder	Carencro, Louisiana	Stephen F. Austin
Carter Sutton	Pitcher (RHP)	Vancouver, Washington	Winthrop
Quinn Waterhouse	Pitcher (LHP)	Bondurant, Iowa	SIU Edwardsville
Trevor Mott	Pitcher (LHP)	Waxahachie, Texas	Western Kentucky
JUCO Transfers
River Orsak	Outfielder	Mont Belvieu, Texas	Alvin CC
Dave Wilson	Infielder	Austin, Texas	Blinn College
Antonio Escano	Pitcher (RHP)	Santo Domingo Dominican Republic	State Fair CC
Lander Suarez	Infielder	Valencia, Venezuela	Highland CC
Andres Perez	Pitcher (RHP)	Cuauhtemoc, Chihuahua Mexico	El Paso CC
Austin Neal	Pitcher (RHP)	Claremore, Oklahoma	Fort Scott CC
Connor Kaiser	Outfielder	College Station, Texas	Galveston College
Foster Kreuzer	Pitcher (RHP)	Anahuac, Texas	Galveston College
Gavin Green	Pitcher (RHP)	Bridge City, Texas	Baton Rouge CC
Griffin Clark	Infielder	Midland, Michigan	Chattanooga State CC
Hunter Hessletine	Pitcher (LHP)	Topeka, Kansas	Barton CC
Jackson Cleveland	Pitcher (RHP) / Outfielder	Deer Park, Texas	North Central Texas College
Jesse Herrera	Catcher	San Antonio, Texas	New Mexico JC
Kole Tauzin	Pitcher (RHP)	Tomball, Texas	Wharton JC
Landon Roque	Infielder	Dickinson, Texas	Angelina CC
Luke Bumpus	Outfielder	Wylie, Texas	Midland College
Peyton Sanderson	Shortstop	Austin, Texas	Paris JC
Ryan Sosa	Catcher	Groves, Texas	Panola College
High School Signees
Trent Caram	Pitcher (RHP)	Houston, Texas	St. Pius X HS
Easton Culp	Catcher / Infielder	Salado, Texas	Harker Heights HS
Brett Hall	Outfielder	Leander, Texas	Leander HS
Ethan Ocuguera	Pitcher (RHP)	Bridge City, Texas	Bridge City HS
Kameryn Henderson	Outfielder	Orange, Texas	Orangefield HS
Tyler Hubbard	Outfielder	Austin, Texas	Vandegrift HS

=== Southland Conference Coaches Poll ===
The Southland Conference Coaches Poll was released on February 3, 2023. Lamar was picked to finish third in the Southland Conference with 88 votes.

Coaches poll
Predicted finish	Team	Votes (1st place)
1	McNeese State	118 (7)
2	Southeastern Louisiana	115 (10)
3	Lamar	88
4	New Orleans	87
5	Northwestern State	65 (1)
6	Nicholls	59
7	Texas A&M–Corpus Christi	55
8	Houston Christian	41
9	Incarnate Word	20

=== Preseason All-Southland team ===
One Lamar player was named to the conference preseason second team.

==== First Team ====
- Edgar Alvarez (NICH, JR, 1st Base)
- Brad Burckel (MCNS, SR, 2nd Base)
- Josh Leslie (MCNS, SR, 3rd Base)
- Parker Coddou (NICH, JR, Shortstop)
- Bo Willis (NWST, JR, Catcher)
- Tre Jones (TAMUCC, JR, Designated Hitter)
- Payton Harden (MCNS, SR, Outfielder)
- Brendan Ryan (TAMUCC, SR, Outfielder)
- Xane Washington (NICH, R-SR, Outfielder)
- Zach Garcia (TAMUCC, SO, Starting Pitcher)
- Grant Rogers (MCNS, JR, Starting Pitcher)
- Tyler Theriot (NICH, SR, Starting Pitcher)
- Burrell Jones (MCNS, SR, Relief Pitcher)
- Alec Carr (UIW, SR, Utility)

==== Second Team ====
- Josh Blankenship (LU, SR, 1st Base)
- Daunte Stuart (NWST, JR, 2nd Base)
- Kasten Furr (NO, JR, 3rd Base)
- Tyler Bischke (NO, JR, Shortstop)
- Bryce Grizzaffi (SELA, SR, Catcher)
- Kade Hunter (MCNS, SR, Designated Hitter)
- Josh Caraway (TAMUCC, JR, Outfielder)
- Braden Duhon (MCNS, JR, Outfielder)
- Issac Williams (NO, JR, Outfielder)
- Cal Carver (NWST, SR, Starting Pitcher)
- Tyler LeBlanc (NO, JR, Starting Pitcher)
- Will Kinzeler (SELA, JR, Starting Pitcher)
- Dalton Aspholm (SELA, SR, Relief Pitcher)
- Tre’ Obregon III (MCNS, SR, Utility)

== Roster ==
2023 Lamar Cardinals baseball team
Players
Coaches

#	Pos.	Name	B/T	Height	Weight	Year	Home town
1	INF	Cameron Yadon	R/R	5 ft 11 in (1.8 m)	165 lb (75 kg)	So	Bridge City, TX
2	RHP	Andres Perez	R/R	5 ft 10 in (1.78 m)	185 lb (84 kg)	So	Cuauhtemoc, Chihuahua, Mexico
3	OF	River Orsak	R/R	5 ft 10 in (1.78 m)	190 lb (86 kg)	Jr	Mont Belvieu, TX
4	OF	Ben MacNaughton	R/R	6 ft 1 in (1.85 m)	165 lb (75 kg)	Sr	Edmond, OK
5	INF	Jack Schell	L/R	6 ft 0 in (1.83 m)	185 lb (84 kg)	Sr	Houston, TX
6	RHP	Daniel Cole	R/R	5 ft 11 in (1.8 m)	194 lb (88 kg)	Sr	Harker Heights, TX
7	RHP	Carter Sutton	R/R	6 ft 4 in (1.93 m)	180 lb (82 kg)	Jr	Vancouver, WA
8	INF	Kevin Bermudez	R/R	5 ft 9 in (1.75 m)	165 lb (75 kg)	Jr	Caguas, Puerto Rico
9	C	Ryan Snell	R/R	5 ft 10 in (1.78 m)	206 lb (93 kg)	Sr	Hardin, TX
11	LHP	Jeremy Rivera	L/L	6 ft 0 in (1.83 m)	205 lb (93 kg)	Sr	Toa Alta, Puerto Rico
12	RHP	Brooks Caple	R/R	6 ft 6 in (1.98 m)	230 lb (104 kg)	Jr	Gunter, TX
13	INF	Ethan Ruiz	R/R	5 ft 8 in (1.73 m)	175 lb (79 kg)	Sr	Round Rock, TX
14	RHP	Trhea Morse	R/R	5 ft 10 in (1.78 m)	175 lb (79 kg)	Jr	Alvin, TX
16	INF	Kanin Dodge	R/R	5 ft 10 in (1.78 m)	180 lb (82 kg)	Jr	Carencro, LA
17	INF	Dave Wilson	R/R	6 ft 0 in (1.83 m)	215 lb (98 kg)	Sr	Austin, TX
18	RHP	Zach William	R/R	6 ft 1 in (1.85 m)	195 lb (88 kg)	Jr	College Station, TX
19	INF	Peyton Sanderson	L/R	6 ft 0 in (1.83 m)	200 lb (91 kg)	Jr	Austin, TX
20	LHP	Jacob Ellis	L/L	6 ft 1 in (1.85 m)	175 lb (79 kg)	Jr	Edmond, OK
21	INF	Landon Roque	R/R	5 ft 11 in (1.8 m)	205 lb (93 kg)	Jr	Dickinson, TX
22	RHP	Gavin Green	R/R	5 ft 11 in (1.8 m)	160 lb (73 kg)	Jr	Bridge City, TX
23	RHP	Kole Tauzin	R/R	6 ft 0 in (1.83 m)	220 lb (100 kg)	Jr	Tomball, TX
24	RHP	Austin Neal	R/R	6 ft 1 in (1.85 m)	180 lb (82 kg)	Jr	Claremore, OK
26	LHP	Quinn Waterhouse	L/L	6 ft 4 in (1.93 m)	210 lb (95 kg)	Sr	Bondurant, IA
27	INF	Lander Saurez	R/R	6 ft 0 in (1.83 m)	210 lb (95 kg)	Jr	Valencia, Venezuela
28	INF	Kirkland Banks	R/R	5 ft 10 in (1.78 m)	177 lb (80 kg)	Sr	Lake Charles, LA
30	RHP	Antonio Escano	R/R	6 ft 2 in (1.88 m)	195 lb (88 kg)	Jr	Santo Domingo, Dominican Republic
31	OF	Kameryn Henderson	R/R	5 ft 11 in (1.8 m)	150 lb (68 kg)	Fr	Orangefield, TX
32	RHP	Foster Kruezer	R/R	6 ft 3 in (1.91 m)	220 lb (100 kg)	Jr	Anahuac, TX
33	RHP	Ethan Oceguera	R/R	6 ft 0 in (1.83 m)	180 lb (82 kg)	Fr	Bridge City, TX
34	C	Monray Van Der Walt	R/R	6 ft 0 in (1.83 m)	203 lb (92 kg)	So	Fulshear, TX
36	RHP	Adam Davis	R/R	6 ft 3 in (1.91 m)	205 lb (93 kg)	Jr	Melissa, TX
37	C	Josh Blankenship	R/R	6 ft 1 in (1.85 m)	210 lb (95 kg)	Sr	Santa Fe, TX
38	OF	Tanner Wilson	R/R	6 ft 1 in (1.85 m)	178 lb (81 kg)	Jr	Bridge City, TX
39	C	Easton Culp	R/R	6 ft 0 in (1.83 m)	195 lb (88 kg)	Fr	Salado, TX
42	OF	Luke Bumpus	R/L	5 ft 10 in (1.78 m)	181 lb (82 kg)	Jr	Wylie, TX
43	LHP	Hunter Hesseltine	L/L	6 ft 3 in (1.91 m)	190 lb (86 kg)	So	Topeka, KS
45	RHP	Landon Odom	R/R	6 ft 3 in (1.91 m)	195 lb (88 kg)	Sr	Gary, TX
47	OF	Owen Sheldon	R/R	5 ft 9 in (1.75 m)	179 lb (81 kg)	So	Beaumont, TX
48	RHP	Jackson Cleveland	L/R	6 ft 0 in (1.83 m)	190 lb (86 kg)	So	Deer Park, TX
50	OF	Connor Kaiser	L/R	6 ft 0 in (1.83 m)	180 lb (82 kg)	Jr	College Station, TX
51	INF	Griffin Clark	R/R	5 ft 10 in (1.78 m)	180 lb (82 kg)	Jr	Midland, Michigan
52	C	Ryan Sosa	R/R	6 ft 0 in (1.83 m)	202 lb (92 kg)	So	Groves, TX
52	RHP	Patrick Hail	R/R	6 ft 0 in (1.83 m)	240 lb (109 kg)	RS So	Arlington, TX
55	OF	Tyler Hubbard	R/R	6 ft 1 in (1.85 m)	170 lb (77 kg)	Fr	Austin, TX

Head coach

Will Davis – 7th season

Assistant coach(es)

Scott Hatten, Sean Snedeker, and Todd McDowell – Vol. Asst.

Hitting coach(es)

Scott Hatten – 22nd season

Pitching coach(es)

Sean Snedeker – 6th season

Legend

- (C) Team captain
- (S) Suspended
- (I) Ineligible
- Injured
- Current redshirt

Roster
Last update: 2023-01-31

== Schedule and results ==
Legend
	Lamar win
	Lamar loss
	Postponement/Cancelation/Suspensions
**Bold**	Lamar team member
*	Non-Conference game
†	Make-Up Game

2023 Lamar Cardinals baseball game log
Regular season (32–23)

February (9–0)
Date	Opponent	Rank	Site/stadium	Score	Win	Loss	Save	TV	Attendance	Overall record	SLC Record
Feb. 17	Oakland*		Vincent–Beck Stadium • Beaumont, TX	6–5 (10)	Cleveland, Jackson (1-0)	B. Decker (0-1)		ESPN+	1,112	1–0	
Feb. 18	Oakland*		Vincent–Beck Stadium • Beaumont, TX	3–2	Tauzin, Kole (1-0)	C. Stelling (0-1)		ESPN+	1,231	2–0	
Feb. 19	Oakland*		Vincent–Beck Stadium • Beaumont, TX	5–4	Hail, Patrick (1-0)	T. Ware (0-1)	**Cleveland, Jackson (1)**	ESPN+	1,279	3–0	
Feb. 21	at Texas A&M*	5	Blue Bell Park • College Station, TX	7–4	Kreuzer, Foster (1-0)	Dillard, Matt (0-1)	**Cleveland, Jackson (2)**	ESPN+	4,889	4–0	
Feb. 22	Kansas State*		Vincent–Beck Stadium • Beaumont, TX	4–3	Rivera, Jeremy (1–0)	Fajardo, German (0–1)	**Cole, Daniel (1)**	ESPN+	1,817	5–0	
Sugar Land Classic
Feb. 24	vs. New Mexico State*		Constellation Field • Sugar Land, TX	5–2	Cleveland, Jackson (2-0)	Matthew Maloney (0-2)				6–0	
Feb. 25	vs. Stephen F. Austin*		Constellation Field • Sugar Land, TX	2–1	Ellis, Jacob (1-0)	Stapleton (0-2)	**Cole, Daniel (2)**		133	7–0	
Feb. 26	vs. Houston Christian*		Constellation Field • Sugar Land, TX	4–3 (10 inn)	Cleveland, Jackson (3-0)	Wells, Jarek (0-2)				8–0	
Feb. 28	Alcorn State*		Vincent–Beck Stadium • Beaumont, TX	11–2	Waterhouse, Quinn (1-0)	Austin Guzman (0-2)		ESPN+	1,472	9–0	

March (7–9)
Date	Opponent	Rank	Site/stadium	Score	Win	Loss	Save	TV	Attendance	Overall record	SLC Record
Mar. 3	Penn*		Vincent–Beck Stadium • Beaumont, TX	1–6	Coady, Owen (1-1)	**Odom, Landon (0-1)**		ESPN+	2,014	9–1	
Mar. 4	Penn*		Vincent–Beck Stadium • Beaumont, TX	6–7 (10 inn)	Trop, Eli (1-0)	**Cleveland, Jackson (3-1)**	Sarti, Edward (1)	ESPN+	1,501	9–2	
Mar. 5	Penn*		Vincent–Beck Stadium • Beaumont, TX	3–1	**Tauzin, Kole (2-0)**	Dromboski, Ryan (0-1)	**Cleveland, Jackson (3)**	ESPN+	1,523	10–2	
Mar. 8	at LSU*	1	Alex Box Stadium, Skip Bertman Field • Baton Rouge, LA	2–9	Christian Little (2-0)	**Waterhouse, Quinn (1-1)**	Garrett Edwards (1)	SECN+	10,020	10–3	
Mar. 10	UC Riverside*		Vincent–Beck Stadium • Beaumont, TX	5–0	**Ellis, Jacob (2-0)**	Blake Burzell (0-3)		ESPN+	1,197	11–3	
Mar. 11	UC Riverside*		Vincent–Beck Stadium • Beaumont, TX	15–3	**Morse, Trhea (1-0)**	Eric Marrujo (2-1)		ESPN+	1,214	12–3	
Mar. 12	UC Riverside*		Vincent–Beck Stadium • Beaumont, TX	6–2	**Kreuzer, Foster (2-0)**	Jake Gebb (0-2)		ESPN+	1,153	13–3	
Mar. 15	at Missouri*		Taylor Stadium • Columbia, MO	8–10	Lunceford, Logan (2-0)	**Hesseltine, Hunter (0-1)**	Neubeck, Tony (1)	SECN	1,075	13–4	
Mar. 17	vs. Saint Louis*		USA Stadium • Millington, TN	7–8	HENDRICKSON, R. (1-0)	**Cleveland, Jackson (3-2)**			130	13–5	
Mar. 18	vs. Saint Louis*		USA Stadium • Millington, TN	5–6 (10 inn)	BELL, E. (1-0)	**Cole, Daniel (0-1)**			65	13–6	
Mar. 19	vs. Saint Louis*		USA Stadium • Millington, TN	Cancelled due to freezing weather							
Mar. 21	Texas Southern*		Vincent–Beck Stadium • Beaumont, TX	9–2	**Caple, Brooks (1-0)**	Dade Hensley (2-1)		ESPN+	1,104	14–6	
Mar. 24	New Orleans		Vincent–Beck Stadium • Beaumont, TX	4–2	**Kreuzer, Foster (3-0)**	Blanchard, Beau (0-2)	**Cleveland, Jackson (4)**	ESPN+	1,634	15–6	1–0
Mar. 25	New Orleans		Vincent–Beck Stadium • Beaumont, TX	2–5	Mitchell, Brandon (4-2)	**Morse, Trhea (1-1)**		ESPN+	233	15–7	1–1
Mar. 26	New Orleans		Vincent–Beck Stadium • Beaumont, TX	9–4	**Caple, Brooks (2-0)**	Horton, Collin (2-3)	**Cleveland, Jackson (5)**	ESPN+	1,198	16–7	2–1
Mar. 28	Rice*		Vincent–Beck Stadium • Beaumont, TX	3–9	Cristian Cienfuegos (1-0)	**Escano, Antonio (0-1)**		ESPN+	1,739	16–8	
Mar. 31	Nicholls		Vincent–Beck Stadium • Beaumont, TX	8–9 (19 inn)	Jordan, Harper (2-0)	**Cole, Daniel (0-2)**		ESPN+	1,491	16–9	2–2

April (9–9)
Date	Opponent	Rank	Site/stadium	Score	Win	Loss	Save	TV	Attendance	Overall record	SLC Record
Apr. 1	Nicholls		Vincent–Beck Stadium • Beaumont, TX	9–7	**Hesseltine, Hunter (1-1)**	Desandro, Devin (1-3)	**Tauzin, Kole (1)**	ESPN+	1,362	17–9	3–2
Apr. 2	Nicholls		Vincent–Beck Stadium • Beaumont, TX	2–4	Mayers, Jacob (4-1)	**Rivera, Jeremy (1-1)**	Evans, Cade (4)	ESPN+	1,258	17–10	3–3
Apr. 4	at UT Arlington*		Clay Gould Ballpark • Arlington, TX	2–5	Hackett, Bryce (1-3)	**Morse, Trhea (1-2)**	Bailey, Gray (1)	WAC Digital Int'l	510	17–11	
Apr. 6	at Northwestern State		H. Alvin Brown–C. C. Stroud Field • Natchitoches, LA	Cancelled							
Apr. 7	at Northwestern State		H. Alvin Brown–C. C. Stroud Field • Natchitoches, LA	5–13	Flowers, Dawson (1-2)	**Ellis, Jacob (2-1)**		ESPN+	621	17–12	3–4
Apr. 8	at Northwestern State		H. Alvin Brown–C. C. Stroud Field • Natchitoches, LA	9–7	**Caple, Brooks (3-0)**	Makarewich, Alex (2-3)	Cleveland, Jackson (6)	ESPN+		18–12	4–4
Apr. 8	at Northwestern State		H. Alvin Brown–C. C. Stroud Field • Natchitoches, LA	5–6	Froehlich, Kyle (3-0)	**Morse, Trhea (1-3)**		ESPN+	719	18–13	4–5
Apr. 11	at Rice*		Reckling Park • Houston, TX	3–7	Krishna Raj (2-1)	**Tauzin, Kole (2-1)**		CUSAtv	2,001	18–14	
Apr. 14	at Incarnate Word		Sullivan Field • San Antonio, TX	7–9	Stacey, Otto (2-0)	**Cleveland, Jackson (3-3)**		ESPN+	191	18–15	4–6
Apr. 15	at Incarnate Word		Sullivan Field • San Antonio, TX	1–5	Zavala, Isaiah (6-0)	**Ellis, Jacob (2-2)**	Hayward, Steve (4)	ESPN+	230	18–16	4–7
Apr. 16	at Incarnate Word		Sullivan Field • San Antonio, TX	6–1	**Hesseltine, Hunter (2-1)**	Berens, Micah (2-1)		ESPN+	202	19–16	5–7
Apr. 18	at TCU*		Lupton Stadium • Fort Worth, TX	9–6	**Hail, Patrick (2-0)**	Sloan, Braeden (2-3)	**Cleveland, Jackson (7)**	ESPN+	3,455	20–16	
Apr. 21	Texas A&M–Corpus Christi		Vincent–Beck Stadium • Beaumont, TX	3–4	Watson, Matthew (3-3)	**Cleveland, Jackson (3-4)**	Dean, Austin (5)	ESPN+	1,476	20–17	5–8
Apr. 22	Texas A&M–Corpus Christi		Vincent–Beck Stadium • Beaumont, TX	10–8 (8 inn)	**Ellis, Jacob (3-2)**	Purcell, Colin (3-4)		ESPN+	1,366	21–17	6–8
Apr. 23	Texas A&M–Corpus Christi		Vincent–Beck Stadium • Beaumont, TX	5–7 (11 inn)	Garcia, Zach (2-2)	**Tauzin, Kole (2-2)**	Dickey, Kyle (1)	ESPN+	1,668	21–18	6–9
Apr. 25	at Houston*		Schroeder Park • Houston, TX	4–2	**Green, Gavin (1-0)**	AYERS, Kyle (1-1)	**Tauzin, Kole (2)**	ESPN+	1,130	22–18	
Apr. 28	at Southeastern Louisiana		Pat Kenelly Diamond at Alumni Field • Hammond, LA	5–4	**Caple, Brooks (4-0)**	Lauve, Lance (2-2)		ESPN+	1,212	23–18	7–9
Apr. 29	at Southeastern Louisiana		Pat Kenelly Diamond at Alumni Field • Hammond, LA	7–1	**Hesseltine, Hunter (3-1)**	Landry, Andrew (2-6)		ESPN+	1,178	24–18	8–9
Apr. 30	at Southeastern Louisiana		Pat Kenelly Diamond at Alumni Field • Hammond, LA	12–4	**Hail, Patrick (3-0)**	Stuprich, Brennan (3-4)		ESPN+	1,098	25–18	9–9

May (7–3)
Date	Opponent	Rank	Site/stadium	Score	Win	Loss	Save	TV	Attendance	Overall record	SLC Record
May 2	Prairie View A&M*		Vincent–Beck Stadium • Beaumont, TX	13–1	**Cole, Daniel (1-2)**	Elijah Breeden (3-4)		ESPN+	1,298	26–18	
Battle of the Border
May 5	at McNeese		Joe Miller Ballpark • Lake Charles, LA	4–6	Rogers, Grant (10-0)	**Ellis, Jacob (3-3)**	Abraham, Ty (4)	ESPN+	1,674	26–19	9–10
May 6	at McNeese		Joe Miller Ballpark • Lake Charles, LA	3–4	Jones, Burrell (4-2)	**Tauzin, Kole (0-2)**	Abraham, Ty (5)	ESPN+	1,172	26–20	9–11
May 7	at McNeese		Joe Miller Ballpark • Lake Charles, LA	10–9	**Cleveland, Jackson (1-2)**	Abraham, Ty (1-2)	**Morse, Trhea (1)**	ESPN+	1,099	27–20	10–11
May 10	at Baylor*		Baylor Ballpark • Waco, TX	9–2	**Morse, Trhea (2-3)**	Muirhead, Adam (0-1)		ESPN+	1,666	28–20	
May 12	at Stephen F. Austin*		Jaycees Field • Nacogdoches, TX	Cancelled							
May 13	at Stephen F. Austin*		Jaycees Field • Nacogdoches, TX	2–9	R. Boyett (1-1)	**Ellis, Jacob (3-4)**		ESPN+	125	28–21	
May 14	at Stephen F. Austin*		Jaycees Field • Nacogdoches, TX	Cancelled							
May 16	Texas–Rio Grande Valley*		Vincent–Beck Stadium • Beaumont, TX	10–4	**Waterhouse, Quinn (2-1)**	Garza, Randy (2-3)		ESPN+	986	29–21	
May 18	Houston Christian		Vincent–Beck Stadium • Beaumont, TX	11–1 (7 inn)	**Ellis, Jacob (4-4)**	Gunter, Rye (1-5)	**Waterhouse, Quinn (1)**	ESPN+	1,098	30–21	11–11
May 19	Houston Christian		Vincent–Beck Stadium • Beaumont, TX	10–3	**Hesseltine, Hunter (4-1)**	Baumann, Baylor (1-4)		ESPN+	1,614	31–21	12–11
May 20	Houston Christian		Vincent–Beck Stadium • Beaumont, TX	9–5	**Caple, Brooks (5-0)**	Ewald, Tim (0-3)	**Cole, Daniel (3)**	ESPN+		32–21	13–11

Postseason ( 0–2 )

Southland Conference Tournament ( 0–2 )
Date	Opponent	(Seed)/Rank	Site/stadium	Score	Win	Loss	Save	TV	Attendance	Overall record	Tournament record
May 24	vs (4) New Orleans	(3)	Joe Miller Ballpark; Lake Charles, LA	1–4	Mitchell, Brandon (11-3)	**Ellis, Jacob (4-5)**	Mead, Jacob (5)	ESPN+		32–22	0–1
May 25	vs (1) Nicholls	(3)	Joe Miller Ballpark; Lake Charles, LA	0–4	Mayers, Jacob (9-1)	**Hesseltine, Hunter (4-2)**		ESPN+		32–23	0–2

Legend: = Win = Loss = Canceled
Bold = Lamar team member
Rankings are based on the team's current ranking in the D1Baseball poll.

== See also ==
2024 Lamar Lady Cardinals softball team
