= Bryan Fontenot =

American politician serving in the Louisiana House of Representatives

Member of the Louisiana House of Representatives from the 55th district
- Incumbent
- Assumed office January 13, 2020
- Preceded by: Dee Richard

Personal details
- Born: c. 1978 (age 47–48)
- Party: Republican
- Children: 2
- Education: L. E. Fletcher Technical Community College

Bryan Fontenot is an American politician, former law enforcement officer, and businessman serving as a member of the Louisiana House of Representatives from the 55th district. He assumed office on January 13, 2020.

== Education ==
Fontenot graduated from Thibodaux High School in 1996 and studied criminal justice at L. E. Fletcher Technical Community College.

== Career ==
Prior to entering politics, Fontenot owned Thibodaux Driving School, worked at the Lafourche Parish Sheriff's Office, and was a commander in the Thibodaux Police Department's Bureau of Narcotics. He is also the owner and CEO of BRYCO Land Developments.

In 2014, Fontenot was elected as justice of the peace in Lafourche Parish, then to the Louisiana House of Representatives in October 2019. He has voted to support the criminalization of in vitro fertilization and some forms of birth control. He is staunchly anti-abortion and has supported bills that propose the prosecution of women for murder if they receive abortions or miscarry (medically known as "spontaneous abortion") without exception for rape, incest, or protection of the life of the mother. Fontenot voted in 2021 in support of permitless concealed carry and opposed increasing the age requisite for gun purchase, stating that those under the age limit would circumvent this rule by obtaining firearms illegally. In 2022, he proposed paying for more advanced technology to curb crime by regulating golf carts and granting permits to drive them along the side of the road.

In 2024, Fontenot voted in favor of advancing House Bill 545 from the Administration of Criminal Justice committee. The bill, filed by Republican Beryl Amedee, would remove legal protections for obscenity from teachers and librarians in all Louisiana public schools.
