= Ken Brass =

American politician and engineer

Member of the Louisiana House of Representatives from the 58th district
- Incumbent
- Assumed office November 3, 2017
- Preceded by: Ed Price

Personal details
- Born: Kendricks Brass
- Party: Democratic
- Children: 1
- Education: Southern University (BS)

Kendricks "Ken" Brass is an American politician and engineer, serving as a member of the Louisiana House of Representatives from the 58th district. He assumed office on November 3, 2017.

== Education ==
After graduating from Lutcher High School in Lutcher, Louisiana, Brass earned a Bachelor of Science degree in electrical engineering from Southern University in 1999.

== Career ==
Outside of politics, Brass works as an engineer for BASF. He also served as a member of the St. James Parish Council and Lutcher Board of Aldermen. He was elected to the Louisiana House of Representatives in November 2017. Brass also serves as vice chair of the House Transportation, Highways and Public Works Committee. Brass is a member of the Louisiana Legislative Black Caucus. In March 2022, Brass was named the 2021 Legislator of The Year by the Louisiana School Boards Association.
