= Kathy Edmonston =

American politician

Member of the Louisiana House of Representatives from the 88th district
- Incumbent
- Assumed office January 13, 2020
- Preceded by: John Berthelot

Personal details
- Party: Republican
- Education: Louisiana State University (BA)
- Profession: Politician

Kathy Edmonston is an American politician currently serving as a member of the Louisiana House of Representatives. She represents District 88 and is a member of the Republican Party and the Louisiana Freedom Caucus. She assumed office on January 13, 2020.

Edmonston has expressed vaccine-hesitant stances, and has tried to pass legislation that would inform parents of the ability to opt-out of school vaccine requirements.

She was previously a member of the Louisiana Board of Elementary and Secondary Education representing District 6 from 2016 to 2020.
