= Johnny Berthelot =

American politician

Louisiana State Representative from District 88 (Ascension Parish)
- In office January 9, 2012 – January 13, 2020
- Preceded by: Mert Smiley
- Succeeded by: Kathy Edmonston

Mayor of Gonzales, Louisiana
- In office 1984–2008
- Succeeded by: Barney Arceneaux

Personal details
- Born: John Alan Berthelot; November 1951 (age 74) Ascension Parish; Louisiana, U.S.
- Party: Republican
- Spouse: Paula Chauvin Berthelot
- Children: 3
- Education: East Ascension High School New Orleans Barber College Louisiana State University Continuing Education
- Occupation: Real estate

John Alan Berthelot, known as Johnny Berthelot (born November 1951), is an American politician who served as a member of the Louisiana House of Representatives for the 88th district from 2012 to 2020.

== Early years ==
The son of J. O. Berthelot and the former Doris Hebert, the Roman Catholic Berthelot attended St. Theresa Catholic School and Gonzales High School. In 1969, he received his diploma from East Ascension High School. In 1970, he graduated from New Orleans Barber College. Berthelot studied in the continuing education program at Louisiana State University in Baton Rouge and completed the course in real estate there in 1975.

== Political career ==
From 1976 to 1984, Berthelot served on the Gonzales City Council and as mayor pro tem. Elected mayor at the age of thirty-two in 1984, he was an advocate for reduced taxes and sound municipal finances. After his first election, he was unopposed for reelection for his last five terms. Berthelot recalls that when he became mayor, the city had to borrow $75,000 from the Bank of Gonzales at 4 percent interest to renovate two water towers. "We now have $27 million (unrestricted) in reserve. We're probably in the best financial shape of any city our size in the United States," said Berthelot late in 2008 as he prepared to turn over his office to Barney Arceneaux, the current mayor.

Berthelot credits the conservative approach to finances that has sustained Gonzales: "When interest rates were double digit, we invested and made money on our interest. The lifeblood of our city is the 2 percent in sales tax we receive, totaling over $10 million a year. This is the main source of revenue." Gonzales is a commercial center with some 100,000 shoppers in the city on a daily basis. Berthelot learned after his election that he was a great-nephew of the founder and first mayor of Gonzales, Joseph "Tee-Joe" Gonzales. Berthelot's father, J. O. Berthelot, also served on the city council and was known for his efforts to eradicate litter in the municipality. The Berthelot family resided two blocks from city hall.

Shortly after the attack on the World Trade Center on September 11, 2001, Mayor Berthelot, Gonzales Police Chief Bill Landry and Gonzales Fire Chief Butch Browning delivered a fire truck donated by the state of Louisiana to municipal firefighters in New York City. The two appeared at the time on NBC's The Today Show, then with host Katie Couric.

In 2011, Berthelot was elected to succeed fellow Republican Mert Smiley in the legislature; Smiley instead was narrowly elected as the Ascension Parish assessor. In the primary held on October 22, Berthelot was the runaway winner, 6,766 votes (71.4 percent). Another Republican, Coral Lambert, trailed with 1,377 votes (14.5 percent). A Democrat, Gary J. Lacombe, finished in third place with 1,331 votes (14.1 percent).

== Personal life ==
Berthelot and his wife, the former Paula Chauvin, have four children, Kim, Shelley, Kelley, and Brad, and five grandchildren, Payton, Reid, Lennon, Gabe, and Grant.

Berthelot is known for his Rotary International-endorsed jambalaya recipe.

Louisiana House of Representatives
Preceded by Mert Smiley	Louisiana State Representative from District 88 (Ascension Parish); Johnny Berthelot; 2012–2020	Succeeded by Kathy Edmonston
