= Dee Richard =

American politician

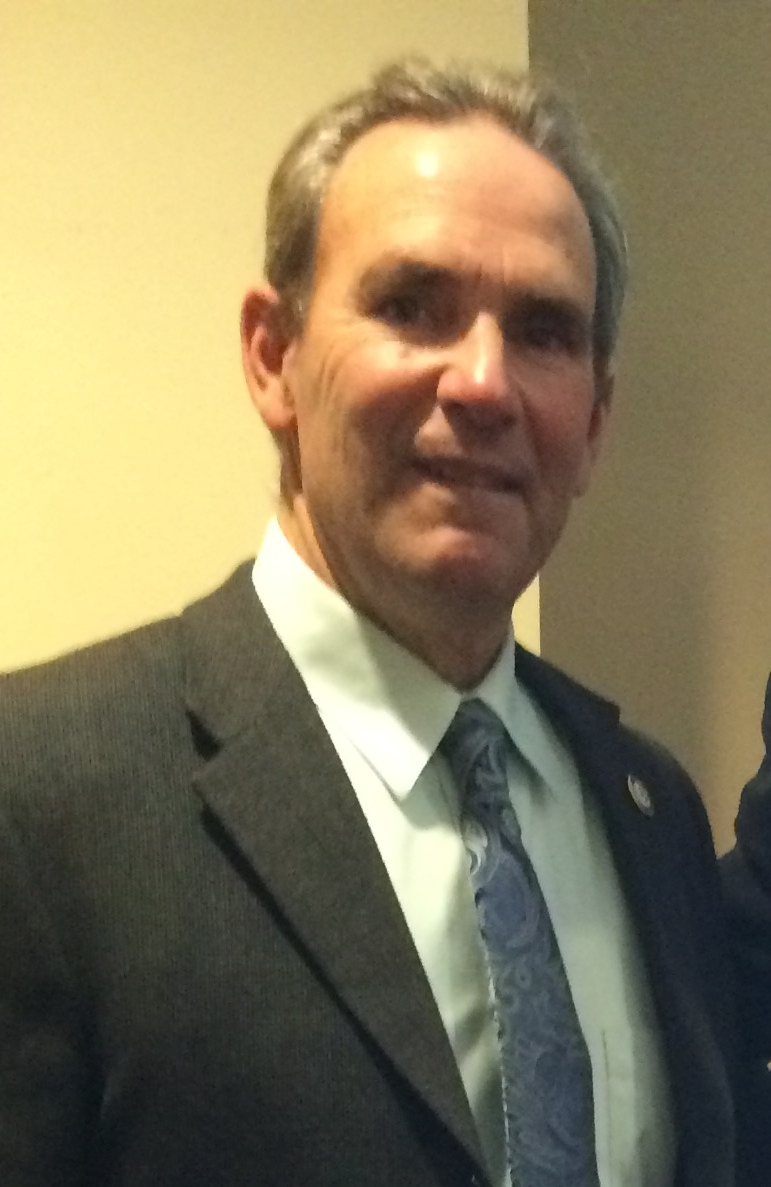

Member of the Louisiana House of Representatives from the 55th district
- In office January 2008 – January 13, 2020
- Preceded by: Warren Triche
- Succeeded by: Bryan Fontenot

Personal details
- Born: Jerome P. Richard; March 27, 1955 (age 71) Thibodaux, Louisiana, U.S.
- Party: Independent
- Other political affiliations: Democratic
- Spouse: Connie Berger Richard
- Children: 2
- Education: Louisiana State University (BS)

Jerome P. "Dee" Richard (born March 27, 1955) is an American politician who served as a member of the Louisiana House of Representatives from 2008 to 2020. A native and resident of Thibodaux, Richard represented the 55th district, which encompasses Lafourche Parish, Louisiana.

== Background ==
Richard is the fifth of seven children of Paul E. Richard of the St. Charles Community in Lafourche Parish and the former Doris Roux, a native of Lockport. He graduated in 1973 from Thibodaux High School and attended Nicholls State University in Thibodaux for a year before he transferred to Louisiana State University in Baton Rouge, from which he received a Bachelor of Science degree in business education in 1978.

== Career ==
Richard taught school briefly after his graduation from LSU and then ventured into the petrochemical industry. His most recent position has been as sales manager for Byron Talbot Contractors.

Richard served two stints as a Democrat on the Lafourche Parish School Board, from 1982 to 1984 and again from 1986 to 1994. In 1998, while still a Democrat, Richard was elected to the at-large seat on the Thibodaux City Council. He polled 2,511 votes (61.1 percent) to defeat another Democrat, Stella Chiasson Lasseigne, who received 1,601 votes (38.9 percent).

=== Louisiana House of Representatives ===
In the nonpartisan blanket primary held on October 20, 2007 to fill the state House seat vacated by the term-limited Warren Triche, a Democrat, Richard led a four-candidate field with 5,562 votes (40.7 percent). He was placed into a second round of balloting with Democrat Michael "Mike" Matherne, who received 3,369 votes (24.64 percent). The third place candidate, "Jay" Caillouet, also a Democrat, trailed Matherne by 2 votes, 3,367 (24.63 percent) and was hence eliminated from contention. The fourth-place candidate was Republican Alfred "Al" Carter, who finished with 1,375 votes (10.1 percent). In the general election, Richard defeated Matherne, 4,120 (58.62 percent) to 2,908 (41.4 percent). Richard received fewer raw votes in the general election than he had the primary but won on the basis of lower turnout.

In announcing his campaign for a second term in the House in 2011, Richard cited his chief accomplishments as support for higher educational institutions in Acadiana, protection of the coastal wetlands, and reducing the size of state government.

Richard was reelected to the state House in the primary election held on October 22, 2011, when he defeated a restaurant/bar owner from Raceland, the Republican Bobby "Beck" Grabert, 8,123 (78 percent) to 2,286 (22 percent).

Richard serves on these House committees: (1) Education (2) Labor and Industrial Relations, and (3) Transportation, Highways, and Public Works. He is a member of the Louisiana Rural Caucus. He is rated 59 percent by the interest group, the Louisiana Association of Business and Industry. Richard successfully pushed for unanimous House passage of a bill to require the Louisiana Office of Contractual Review to reduce by 10 percent the amount spent on consulting service contracts for the next fiscal year. Richard said the change could reduce the state budget deficit by about $500 million.

Richard is politically conservative and frequently appears on the statewide radio talk show, The Moon Griffon Show, broadcast from Lafayette.

== Personal life ==
Richard and his wife, the former Connie Berger, have a daughter, Victoria (born 1995).

Louisiana House of Representatives
Preceded by Warren Triche	Louisiana State Representative for District 55 (Lafourche Parish); 2008–	Succeeded by Incumbent
