= Sylvia Elaine Taylor =

American politician

Member of the Louisiana House of Representatives from the 57th district
- Incumbent
- Assumed office January 8, 2024
- Preceded by: Randal Gaines

Personal details
- Party: Democratic
- Education: Dillard University (BA), Southern University Law Center, Loyola University New Orleans (JD)
- Profession: Attorney

Sylvia Elaine Taylor is an American politician serving as a member of the Louisiana House of Representatives, representing the 57th District. A member of the Democratic Party, Taylor assumed office on January 8, 2024. She is the first woman and the first Black woman to represent District 57.

== Career ==
Before entering politics, Taylor made her mark as a Workers' Compensation Judge, serving until her retirement in 2015. Post-retirement, she continued to contribute to the legal field through her private law firm in LaPlace, Louisiana.

In 2023, Taylor was elected to the Louisiana House of Representatives for District 57, becoming the first woman and first Black woman to hold the position.

== See also ==
- Louisiana House of Representatives
