= Ed Price (Louisiana politician) =

American politician

Member of the Louisiana State Senate from the 2nd district
- Incumbent
- Assumed office June 16, 2017
- Preceded by: Troy E. Brown

Member of the Louisiana House of Representatives from the 58th district
- In office January 2012 – May 2017
- Preceded by: Elton M. Aubert
- Succeeded by: Ken Brass

Personal details
- Born: Edward Joseph Price
- Party: Democratic
- Education: Grambling State University

Edward J. Price is an American politician. He served as a Democratic member for the 58th district of the Louisiana House of Representatives, and is currently a member for the 2nd district of the Louisiana State Senate.

Price attended Grambling State University, where he earned a Bachelor of Arts degree in 1975. In 2012, he was elected for the 58th district of the Louisiana House of Representatives, succeeding Elton M. Aubert. In 2017, he was succeeded by Ken Brass and elected to the Louisiana State Senate, succeeding Troy E. Brown for the 2nd district. He assumed his office on June 16, 2017.
