= Gonzales, Louisiana =

- City
- City of Gonzales
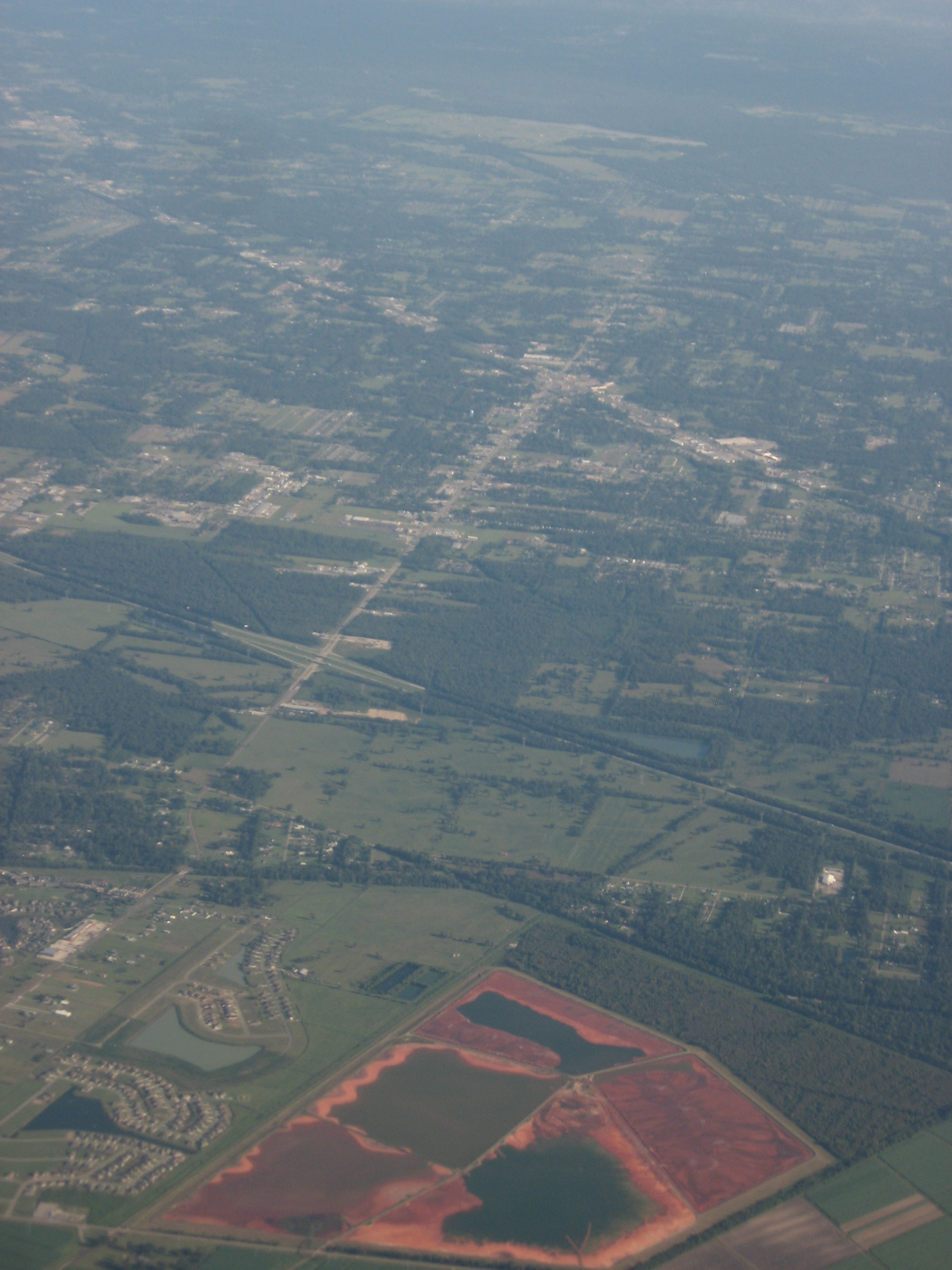
- 2009 aerial photo of Gonzales

- Location of Gonzales in Ascension Parish, Louisiana.

- Location of Louisiana in the United States
- Coordinates: 30°13′38″N 90°55′11″W
- Country: United States
- State: Louisiana
- Parish: Ascension
- Named for: Tee Joe Gonzales

Government
  - Type: Mayor-council
  - Mayor: Tim Riley
  - Police Chief: Sherman Jackson (both elected since 2012)

Area
  - Total: 9.25 sq mi (23.96 km^{2})
  - Land: 9.14 sq mi (23.68 km^{2})
  - Water: 0.11 sq mi (0.28 km^{2})
- Elevation: 10 ft (3.0 m)

Population (2020)
  - Total: 12,231
  - Density: 1,337.9/sq mi (516.58/km^{2})
- Time zone: UTC-6 (CST)
  - Summer (DST): UTC-5 (CDT)
- ZIP code: 70737
- Area code: 225
- FIPS code: 22-29850
- Website: www.gonzalesla.com

Gonzales is a city in Ascension Parish, Louisiana, United States. As of the 2020 census, it has a population of 12,231. Known as the "Jambalaya Capital of the World", it is famous for its annual Jambalaya Festival, which was first held in 1968.

== History ==
Early European settlers of the area that was developed as Gonzales were, for the most part, of French and Spanish ancestry. They settled among the Houma Indians who lived in the area.

Among the projects and plans carried out by Luis de Unzaga ("Le Conciliateur") while he was governor of Louisiana between 1769 and 1777 was the promotion of new settlements by Europeans; among them were French Acadians and Málaga in the fertile Mississippi region, and more specifically in the Unzaga Post or "Puesto de Unzaga" that he created in 1771 in Pointe Coupee, the parish of Saint Gabriel in 1773 and Fort Manchac in 1776; the Gonzales people occupied land at the confluence of the aforementioned European settlements.

By 1851, the small European settlement still had only ten residents. A school was established in 1855 by Adlard Gautreaux for the European-American children in the area. By 1886, the settlement had grown, and the citizens of the community elected "Big" José Gonzáles as their sheriff. José's son, Joseph "Tee-Joe" (for Petit Joe) Gonzales, opened a general store and post office in May 1887. The post office became known as the Gonzales Post Office.

Construction of the railroad to the village stimulated the growth of Gonzales. When the Louisiana Railway and Navigation Company (LR&N) constructed its rail line through the area, the local post office was already named Gonzales. The rail company executives wanted to name their station Edenborn, after the company's owner, Willam Edenborn. The company also wanted to move the station north of the area to New River, Louisiana, then called Belle Hellene. After local residents filed protests with the Louisiana Railroad Commission, the railroad company was ordered to leave the station at Gonzales. The LR&N still tried to change the name to Edenborn. But the residents continued to protest and persuaded the Louisiana Legislature to pass a law requiring railroad companies to name their railroad stations the same as the local post offices.

Gonzales was laid out and subdivided in 1906. It was officially incorporated as a village in 1922. Joseph Gonzales was elected as the first mayor. The village continued to grow, with transportation improved by construction of Airline Highway.

Governor Earl K. Long proclaimed Gonzales as a town in 1952, during his term. The town held its first Jambalaya Festival in 1968. Governor John J. McKeithen marked the occasion by proclaiming Gonzales as the "Jambalaya Capital of the World".

Following the growth of industrial corporations in the area, the town was chartered by the state legislature as a city in 1977.

Gonzales became better known in 2005, after the widespread destruction caused by Hurricane Katrina. The National Guard, and HSUS and other animal rescue groups, established their bases at the fairground in Gonzales. This became their main search and rescue headquarters, as well as the site for holding pets pending return to their families; the animals were rescued from New Orleans and many other locations. Some people were reunited with their lost pets at this site.

In 2024, the City of Gonzales saw the election its first African-American Mayor, Timothy “Tim” Riley along with its first female council members; Terri Lambert and Cynthia Gray James. James would also go down in history as the city’s first minority female to be elected to public office.

== Geography ==
Gonzales is located at 30°13′38″N 90°55′11″W (30.227128, -90.919771). According to the United States Census Bureau, the city has a total area of 8.5 square miles (22.0 km^{2}), of which 8.4 square miles (21.7 km^{2}) is land and 0.12 square miles (0.3 km^{2}), or 1.27%, is water.

=== Climate ===
Gonzales has a subtropical climate, with hot summers and mild winters. The area is subject to potential severe weather year-round, with snowfall being rare for the city. Hurricanes also pose a threat to the area due to its proximity to the coastline of southeast Louisiana. In September 2008, Hurricane Gustav brought 80+ mph winds to the area with gusts over 100 mph.

== Demographics ==
Historical population
Census	Pop.	Note	%±
1930	462		—
1940	857		85.5%
1950	1,642		91.6%
1960	3,252		98.1%
1970	4,512		38.7%
1980	7,287		61.5%
1990	7,003		−3.9%
2000	8,156		16.5%
2010	9,781		19.9%
2020	12,231		25.0%
2025 (est.)	13,930	▲	13.9%
U.S. Decennial Census

=== Racial and ethnic composition ===
Gonzales, Louisiana – Racial and ethnic composition Note: the US Census treats Hispanic/Latino as an ethnic category. This table excludes Latinos from the racial categories and assigns them to a separate category. Hispanics/Latinos may be of any race.
Race / Ethnicity (NH = Non-Hispanic)	Pop 2000	Pop 2010	Pop 2020	% 2000	% 2010	% 2020
White alone (NH)	5,210	4,420	4,432	63.88%	45.19%	36.24%
Black or African American alone (NH)	2,540	4,293	5,730	31.14%	43.89%	46.85%
Native American or Alaska Native alone (NH)	15	15	33	0.18%	0.15%	0.27%
Asian alone (NH)	49	96	101	0.60%	0.98%	0.83%
Native Hawaiian or Pacific Islander alone (NH)	1	2	4	0.01%	0.02%	0.03%
Other race alone (NH)	5	17	36	0.06%	0.17%	0.29%
Mixed race or Multiracial (NH)	41	114	317	0.50%	1.17%	2.59%
Hispanic or Latino (any race)	295	824	1,578	3.62%	8.42%	12.90%
Total	8,156	9,781	12,231	100.00%	100.00%	100.00%

=== 2000 census ===
In 2000, there were 8,156 people, 2,966 households, and 2,156 families residing in the city. The population density was 974.2 inhabitants per square mile (376.1/km^{2}). There were 3,332 housing units at an average density of 398.0 per square mile (153.7/km^{2}). As of the 2020 United States census, there were 12,231 people, 4,159 households, and 2,807 families residing in the city.

At the 2000 census, the racial makeup of the city was 65.40% White, 31.25% African American, 0.22% Native American, 0.61% Asian, 0.01% Pacific Islander, 1.64% from other races, and 0.86% from two or more races. Hispanic or Latino of any race were 3.62% of the population. By 2020, its racial makeup was 36.24% non-Hispanic white, 46.85% African American, 0.27% Native American, 0.83% Asian, 0.03% Pacific Islander, 2.89% multiracial, and 12.9% Hispanic or Latino of any race, reflecting state and nationwide trends of greater diversification.

In 2000, there were 2,966 households, out of which 36.3% had children under the age of 18 living with them, 51.6% were married couples living together, 17.0% had a female householder with no husband present, and 27.3% were non-families. 23.0% of all households were made up of individuals, and 6.9% had someone living alone who was 65 years of age or older. The average household size was 2.68 and the average family size was 3.18.

In the city, the population was spread out, with 27.4% under the age of 18, 10.1% from 18 to 24, 30.0% from 25 to 44, 22.3% from 45 to 64, and 10.2% who were 65 years of age or older. The median age was 34 years. For every 100 females, there were 91.1 males. For every 100 females age 18 and over, there were 89.3 males.

The median income for a household in the city was $38,173, and the median income for a family was $43,117 in 2000. Males had a median income of $38,731 versus $22,168 for females. The per capita income for the city was $17,690. About 14.9% of families and 16.6% of the population were below the poverty line, including 23.6% of those under age 18 and 14.5% of those age 65 or over. The median household income as of 2021's American Community Survey estimates increased to $59,108.

== Government ==
The city is governed by a mayor-council form of government. The mayor is elected at-large, and the five council members are elected from city wide at large single-member divisions, One city council division is reserved for African American candidates. The Chief of Police is elected.The current mayor of Gonzales is Tim Riley.

=== Legislative delegation ===
District 59 State Representative Tony Bacala of Ascension Parish is a retired law enforcement officer, State Senator Eddie Lambert a family law attorney who represents Ascension, Livingston, St. James, and St. John the Baptist.

Edward Joseph Price, an African-American Democrat and a Gonzales businessman, has held the District 58 House seat for Ascension, Iberville and St. James parishes since 2012.

State Representative Randal Gaines, of St. John the Baptist Parish, formerly resided in Gonzales.

== National Guard ==
Gonzales is home to the 922nd engineer vertical construction company, which is part of the 528th engineer battalion, 225th engineer brigade. 922nd EVCC plays a pivotal role in providing humanitarian relief during natural disasters within the United States, along with remaining ready to deploy anywhere in the world as they are needed.

== Notable people ==
- Andrew Glover, Former NFL player
- Alicia Morton, actress
- Cleo Moore, actress
- Glenn Dorsey, NFL player
- Robert Hillary King, born here as Robert King Wilkerson, grew up in New Orleans. He was one of the Angola Three, surviving decades of incarceration in solitary confinement. His 1973 conviction of murder was overturned, and he was released in 2001, the first of the three men to gain freedom.

== Sister cities ==
Gonzales has one sister city, as designated by Sister Cities International:

- Meylan, France
