= Louisiana Highway 24 =

State highway in Louisiana, United States

Louisiana Highway 24

- Route of LA 24 highlighted in red

Route information
- Maintained by Louisiana DOTD
- Length: 35.647 mi (57.368 km)
- Existed: 1955 renumbering–present
- Tourist routes: Louisiana Scenic Byway: Wetlands Cultural Byway

Major junctions
- West end: LA 20 in Schriever
- Future I-49 / US 90 in Gray; LA 182 in Houma; LA 57 in Houma; LA 56 in Houma; LA 55 at Klondyke
- East end: LA 3235 in Larose

Location
- Country: United States
- State: Louisiana
- Parishes: Terrebonne, Lafourche

Highway system
- Louisiana State Highway System; Interstate; US; State; Scenic
← LA 23	→ LA 25

Louisiana Highway 24 (LA 24) is a state highway located in southeastern Louisiana. It runs 35.65 miles (57.37 km) in a general east–west direction from LA 20 in Schriever to LA 3235 in Larose.

The route has two distinct sections, the longer of which travels through Terrebonne Parish on either side of Bayou Terrebonne. It serves as the main highway through the city of Houma, which is also the parish seat. This portion of the highway is bannered east–west, though it runs primarily north–south. Southeast of Houma, LA 24 does assume an east–west trajectory as it turns away from Bayou Terrebonne and proceeds to the Lafourche Parish community of Larose, located at the junction of Bayou Lafourche and the Gulf Intracoastal Waterway.

LA 24 was designated in the 1955 Louisiana Highway renumbering, its two sections previously bearing different designations—State Route 69 along Bayou Terrebonne and State Route 966 along the Bourg-Larose Highway. Like many of the region's older rural highways, the former evolved from the natural strip of high ground that formed on the banks of the bayou while the latter was constructed on a man-made embankment by the state highway department in the early 1930s.

== Route description ==
=== Schriever to Houma ===
From the west, LA 24 begins at an interchange with LA 20 in Schriever, a small community located just south of Thibodaux. The interchange is located at a point where LA 20 changes its direction from east to north en route from Gibson to Thibodaux, simultaneously crossing over the BNSF/Union Pacific railroad line. LA 24 initially heads southeast from the base of the overpass as a standard divided four-lane highway. After a short distance, the travel lanes divide onto the one-way pair of West Main Street (eastbound) and West Park Avenue (westbound) to run on either side of Bayou Terrebonne.

While traveling from Schriever through the neighboring areas of Magnolia, Gray, and Bayou Cane, LA 24 intersects several other routes that follow parallel bayous. These include LA 311 (Little Bayou Black), LA 316 (Bayou Blue), and LA 660 (Bayou Little Coteau). During this stretch, LA 24 also passes through a diamond interchange with US 90 at exit 202, which connects to Morgan City and New Orleans. In Bayou Cane, LA 24 intersects LA 3040 (Martin Luther King Boulevard), a parallel four-lane highway and commercial corridor through the city of Houma.

Entering Houma proper, LA 24 turns eastward, maintaining its path flanking Bayou Terrebonne. The highway passes through the city's historic downtown area and intersects LA 182, the pre-freeway alignment of US 90. LA 182 runs concurrent with LA 24 for two blocks as it zigzags from Barrow Street onto New Orleans Boulevard. Eastbound LA 182 still provides the most direct connection from Downtown Houma toward New Orleans, as US 90 now bypasses the city. Immediately east of New Orleans Boulevard, LA 24 crosses a high-level twin-span bridge over the Gulf Intracoastal Waterway. Returning to grade, LA 24 narrows to an undivided two-lane highway, as Main Street begins to carry two-way traffic at an intersection with LA 57 (Grand Caillou Road). At this point, westbound LA 24 traffic crosses from the south side of Bayou Terrebonne to the north side by way of a vertical lift bridge at the LA 57 junction. Park Avenue continues downstream as LA 659, also carrying two-way traffic across the bayou from LA 24.

=== East Houma to Larose ===
Continuing through East Houma, LA 24 bends to the southeast with Bayou Terrebonne. An intersection with LA 3087 (Prospect Boulevard) provides a connection with LA 182 north of the city. While passing alongside the Houma-Terrebonne Airport, LA 24 begins to follow Bayou Petit Caillou, which branches off of Bayou Terrebonne. In an area known as Presquille, LA 56 picks up this route, while LA 24 makes a zigzag across both Bayous Petit Caillou and Terrebonne, exiting the Houma city limits, to assume the path of LA 659. Passing through the community of Bourg, LA 24 intersects LA 316 and crosses another lift bridge over the Company Canal. Shortly afterward, LA 24 turns northeast away from Bayou Terrebonne at Klondyke while LA 55 assumes the route southeast toward Montegut. LA 24 then curves eastward again and crosses from Terrebonne Parish into Lafourche Parish.

LA 24 follows the Bourg-Larose Highway through thickly wooded swampland for approximately 14 miles (23 km), largely traveling alongside the hidden Bayou Blue. Soon after curving northward along the Gulf Intracoastal Waterway, LA 24 enters the unincorporated town of Larose. The highway officially ends at a T-intersection with LA 3235, a wide four-lane divided highway. LA 3235 parallels the two-lane LA 1 southward toward Grand Isle, providing a route for trucks and other through traffic in the area. Straight ahead, a local road continues the path of LA 24 to a junction with LA 1 where the latter crosses the Gulf Intracoastal Waterway.

=== Route classification and data ===
LA 24 is classified by the Louisiana Department of Transportation and Development (La DOTD) as an urban principal arterial for the majority of its route. During this stretch, the daily traffic volume peaked at 26,000 vehicles in Houma during 2013. The easternmost portion of the route along the Bourg-Larose Highway, however, is classified as a rural minor arterial with traffic volume reported as low as 6,600 vehicles. The posted speed limit ranges from 55 mph (90 km/h) in rural areas to 25 mph (40 km/h) through the center of Houma.

The entirety of LA 24 is part of the Wetlands Cultural Byway in the state-designated system of tourist routes known as the Louisiana Scenic Byways.

== History ==
=== Pre-1955 route designations ===
In the original Louisiana Highway system in use prior to 1955, the modern LA 24 was split between two different routes. The longer portion along Bayou Terrebonne from Schriever to Bourg made up the majority of State Route 69, which also extended northwest to Thibodaux (now part of LA 20) and southeast to Montegut (now part of LA 55). Route 69 was one of the first 98 state highway routes designated by the Louisiana Legislature in 1921 as part of an act which also created the Louisiana Highway Commission, an early forerunner of the Louisiana Department of Transportation and Development (La DOTD). Like many of the region's older rural highways, this portion of LA 24 evolved from the strip of high ground that formed naturally on the banks of the bayou. By contrast, the remainder of LA 24 between Bourg and Larose follows a man-made embankment through swampland that was constructed in 1933 by the Highway Commission. This portion of the route had been designated as State Route 966 by an act of the state legislature in 1930.

=== 1955 renumbering ===
Routes 69 and 966 were joined together under the single designation of LA 24 when the Louisiana Department of Highways, the successor to the Highway Commission, renumbered the state highway system in 1955.

Class "A": La 24—From a junction with La 20 at or near Schriever to a junction with La-US 90 at or near Houma.
Class "B": La 24—From a junction with La-US 90 at or near Houma through or near Bourg to a junction with La 1 at or near Larose.

— 1955 legislative route description

With the 1955 renumbering, the state highway department initially categorized all routes into three classes: "A" (primary), "B" (secondary), and "C" (farm-to-market). This system has since been updated and replaced by a more specific functional classification system.

=== Subsequent improvements ===
Since 1955, the most significant change to LA 24 has been the widening of much of the highway to four lanes. Previously, the designation existed solely on the west side of Bayou Terrebonne between Schriever and Houma. The opposite roadway, though discontinuous, had been part of the state highway system since 1930 as State Route 965, which became LA 659 in the 1955 renumbering. In the late 1970s, it was incorporated into the route of LA 24 to carry westbound traffic from Houma north to a point near the present US 90 interchange, which was soon to be constructed. By the late 1980s, the east bank roadway had been extended and improved to give LA 24 a continuous four-lane corridor between Schriever and Houma.

Many of the other improvements to LA 24 over the years have resulted from the construction and/or replacement of bridges along the route. In 1970, the western terminus at LA 20 in Schriever was converted from a simple T-intersection to a grade-separated interchange. This occurred when a four-lane overpass of the Southern Pacific Railroad (now the BNSF/UP) line was constructed on LA 20, moving the route off of what is now Old Schriever Highway, which crossed the tracks at grade. In 1979, a new bridge running diagonally across Bayou Blue on the Bourg-Larose Highway eliminated a zigzag at that point, straightening the roadway. In Houma, the two high-level bridges crossing the Gulf Intracoastal Waterway were constructed in 1996, replacing two grade-level movable bridges at the same location.

Additionally, the junction of LA 24 and US 90, the region's main highway, was moved from what is now LA 182 in Downtown Houma to the present freeway interchange near Gray. The interchange was constructed in 1980, but the freeway existed under the temporary designation of LA 3052 until being completed west to Morgan City in 1999.

Most recently, the eastern terminus of LA 24 was slightly truncated in 2015 when the final 0.37 miles (0.60 km) of the route were transferred to Lafourche Parish. The designation formerly extended past LA 3235 and looped under the West Larose Lift Bridge on LA 1 to intersect that highway at the bridge's eastern approach. This route forced trucks to navigate a tight right-angle turn immediately after a low clearance crossing under the lift bridge. The extension of LA 3235 from Galliano to Larose in the early 2000s eliminated this hazard, and signs now direct all through traffic to turn onto LA 3235 to reach LA 1, although the connection to northbound LA 1 is less direct.

== Major intersections ==
Parish	Location	mi	km	Destinations	Notes
Terrebonne	Schriever	0.000– 0.214	0.000– 0.344	LA 20 – Thibodaux, Morgan City	Western terminus; interchange
Terrebonne		1.521	2.448	LA 311 (St. Bridget Road)	Northern terminus of LA 311
Terrebonne	Gray	3.477	5.596	LA 316 (Bayou Blue Road) – Bayou Blue	Western terminus of LA 316
Terrebonne		4.627– 4.853	7.446– 7.810	US 90 – Morgan City, New Orleans	Exit 202 on US 90
Terrebonne		6.698	10.779	LA 660 (Coteau Road)	Western terminus of LA 660
Terrebonne	Bayou Cane	8.139	13.098	LA 3040 (Martin Luther King Boulevard)	Western terminus of LA 3040
Terrebonne	Bayou Cane–Houma line	10.917	17.569	LA 664 (St. Charles Street)	Northern terminus of LA 664
Terrebonne	Houma	11.738	18.890	LA 312 (Lafayette Street)	Northern terminus of LA 312
Terrebonne	Houma	12.060	19.409	LA 182 west (Barrow Street)	West end of LA 182 concurrency
Terrebonne	Houma	12.230– 12.245	19.682– 19.706	LA 182 east (New Orleans Boulevard) – New Orleans	East end of LA 182 concurrency
Terrebonne	Houma	12.273– 12.923	19.751– 20.798	Bridge over Gulf Intracoastal Waterway	
Terrebonne	Houma	12.982– 13.066	20.893– 21.028	LA 57 south (Grand Caillou Road); LA 659 (Park Avenue)	Northern terminus of LA 57; western terminus of LA 659
Terrebonne	Houma	13.545	21.799	LA 661 west (Howard Avenue)	Eastern terminus of LA 661
Terrebonne	Houma	14.700	23.657	LA 3087 (Prospect Boulevard)	Southern terminus of LA 3087
Terrebonne	Houma	17.471	28.117	LA 56 south (Main Street) – Chauvin, Cocodrie	Southern terminus of LA 56
Terrebonne	Presquille	17.666	28.431	LA 659 (East Park Avenue)	Eastern terminus of LA 659
Terrebonne	Bourg	20.321	32.703	LA 316 (Company Canal Road)	Eastern terminus of LA 316
Terrebonne	Klondyke	21.548	34.678	LA 55 south (Montegut Road) – Montegut	Northern terminus of LA 55
Lafourche	Larose	35.594– 35.647	57.283– 57.368	LA 3235 south (Veterans Memorial Highway) to LA 1 – Cut Off, Grand Isle	Eastern terminus of LA 24; northern terminus of LA 3235
1.000 mi = 1.609 km; 1.000 km = 0.621 mi: Concurrency terminus
