= Wetlands Cultural Byway =

The Wetlands Cultural Byway is a Louisiana Scenic Byway that follows several different state highways, primarily:

- LA 1 and LA 308 along opposite banks of Bayou Lafourche through Lafourche Parish;
- LA 20 and LA 24 generally along Bayou Terrebonne from Thibodaux to Larose;
- LA 56 along the west bank of Bayou Petit Caillou from Cocodrie to Houma;
- LA 57 generally along the east bank of Bayou Grand Caillou from north of Cocodrie to Houma;
- LA 182 along the west bank of Bayou Black from Gibson to Houma; and
- LA 304 and LA 307 in a loop off of the Bayou Lafourche corridor from west of Thibodaux to Raceland.
