= List of state highways in Louisiana (1–99) =

The following is a list of state highways in the U.S. state of Louisiana designated in the 1–99 range.

== Louisiana Highway 1 ==
Louisiana Highway 1
- Location: Grand Isle–Rodessa
- Length: 431.877 mi (695.039 km)
- Existed: 1955–present

Louisiana Highway 1 (LA 1) runs 431.88 miles (695.04 km) in a southeast to northwest direction from a dead end in Grand Isle, Jefferson Parish to the Texas state line northwest of Rodessa, Caddo Parish.

== Louisiana Highway 2 ==
Louisiana Highway 2
- Location: Trees–Lake Providence
- Length: 189.490 mi (304.955 km)
- Existed: 1955–present

Louisiana Highway 2 (LA 2) runs 189.49 miles (304.95 km) in an east–west direction from the Texas state line southwest of Vivian, Caddo Parish to US 65 north of Lake Providence, East Carroll Parish.

== Louisiana Highway 2 Alternate ==
Louisiana Highway 2 Alternate
- Location: Shongaloo–Bernice
- Length: 43.059 mi (69.297 km)
- Existed: 1955–present

Louisiana Highway 2 Alternate (LA 2 Alt.) runs 43.06 miles (69.30 km) in an east–west direction from the junction of LA 2 and LA 159 in Shongaloo, Caddo Parish to the junction of US 63/US 167 and LA 2 in Bernice, Union Parish.

== Louisiana Highway 3 ==
Louisiana Highway 3
- Location: Bossier City–Arkansas state line
- Length: 35.705 mi (57.462 km)
- Existed: 1955–present

Louisiana Highway 3 (LA 3) runs 35.71 miles (57.47 km) in a north–south direction from the junction of I-20, US 71, and LA 72 in Bossier City to the Arkansas state line north of Plain Dealing, Bossier Parish.

== Louisiana Highway 4 ==
Louisiana Highway 4
- Location: Loggy Bayou–Newellton
- Length: 164.537 mi (264.797 km)
- Existed: 1955–present

Louisiana Highway 4 (LA 4) runs 164.54 miles (264.80 km) in an east–west direction from US 71 north of Loggy Bayou, Red River Parish to LA 605 in Newellton, Tensas Parish.

== Louisiana Highway 5 ==
Louisiana Highway 5
- Location: Logansport–Kingston
- Length: 28.361 mi (45.643 km)
- Existed: 1955–present

Louisiana Highway 5 (LA 5) runs 28.36 miles (45.64 km) in a general southwest to northeast direction from US 84 in Logansport to LA 175 at Kingston, DeSoto Parish.

== Louisiana Highway 6 ==
Louisiana Highway 6
- Location: Toledo Bend Reservoir–Clarence
- Length: 54.518 mi (87.738 km)
- Existed: 1955–present

Louisiana Highway 6 (LA 6) runs 54.52 miles (87.74 km) in a southwest to northeast direction from the Texas state line southwest of Many, Sabine Parish to the junction of US 71 and US 84 in Clarence, Natchitoches Parish.

== Louisiana Highway 7 ==
Louisiana Highway 7
- Location: Coushatta–Springhill
- Length: 72.9 mi (117.3 km)
- Existed: 1955–1994

Louisiana Highway 7 (LA 7) ran 72.9 miles (117.3 km) in a north–south direction from US 71 in Coushatta, Red River Parish to the Arkansas state line at Springhill, Webster Parish. The route was replaced with a part of U.S. Route 371 in 1994.

== Louisiana Highway 8 ==
Louisiana Highway 8
- Location: Burr Ferry–Sicily Island
- Length: 156.273 mi (251.497 km)
- Existed: 1955–present

Louisiana Highway 8 (LA 8) runs 156.27 miles (251.49 km) in a southwest to northeast direction from the Texas state line west of Burr Ferry, Vernon Parish to the concurrent US 425/LA 15 in Sicily Island, Catahoula Parish.

== Louisiana Highway 9 ==
Louisiana Highway 9
- Location: Campti–Junction City
- Length: 100.005 mi (160.942 km)
- Existed: 1955–present

Louisiana Highway 9 (LA 9) runs 100.01 miles (160.95 km) in a north–south direction from the concurrent US 71/US 84 in Campti, Natchitoches Parish to the concurrent US 63/US 167 at the Claiborne–Union parish line in Junction City.

== Louisiana Highway 10 ==
Louisiana Highway 10
- Location: Pickering–Bogalusa
- Length: 255.505 mi (411.195 km)
- Existed: 1955–present

Louisiana Highway 10 (LA 10) runs 255.51 miles (411.20 km) in an east–west direction from US 171 south of Leesville, Vernon Parish to the Mississippi state line east of Bogalusa, Washington Parish.

== Louisiana Highway 12 ==
Louisiana Highway 12
- Location: Texas state line–Ragley
- Length: 34.638 mi (55.744 km)
- Existed: 1955–present

Louisiana Highway 12 (LA 12) runs 34.64 miles (55.75 km) in an east–west direction from the Texas state line west of Starks, Calcasieu Parish to the junction of US 171 and US 190 in Ragley, Beauregard Parish.

== Louisiana Highway 13 ==
Louisiana Highway 13
- Location: Kaplan–Turkey Creek
- Length: 63.993 mi (102.987 km)
- Existed: 1955–present

Louisiana Highway 13 (LA 13) runs 63.99 miles (102.98 km) in a north–south direction from LA 14 west of Kaplan, Vermilion Parish to US 167 in Turkey Creek, Evangeline Parish.

== Louisiana Highway 14 ==
Louisiana Highway 14
- Location: Lake Charles–New Iberia
- Length: 100.197 mi (161.251 km)
- Existed: 1955–present

Louisiana Highway 14 (LA 14) runs 100.20 miles (161.26 km) in an east–west direction from the junction of US 90 and US 171 in Lake Charles, Calcasieu Parish to LA 182 in New Iberia, Iberia Parish.

== Louisiana Highway 15 ==
Louisiana Highway 15
- Location: Lettsworth–Lillie
- Length: 194.102 mi (312.377 km)
- Existed: 1955–present

Louisiana Highway 15 (LA 15) runs 194.10 miles (312.37 km) in a north–south direction from the junction of LA 1 and LA 970 northwest of Lettsworth, Pointe Coupee Parish to the concurrent US 63/US 167 in Lillie, Union Parish.

== Louisiana Highway 16 ==
Louisiana Highway 16
- Location: French Settlement–Sun
- Length: 110.234 mi (177.404 km)
- Existed: 1955–present

Louisiana Highway 16 (LA 16) runs 110.23 miles (177.40 km) in a general east–west direction from LA 22 south of French Settlement, Livingston Parish to LA 21 in Sun, Washington Parish.

== Louisiana Highway 17 ==
Louisiana Highway 17
- Location: Winnsboro–Kilbourne
- Length: 66.717 mi (107.371 km)
- Existed: 1955–present

Louisiana Highway 17 (LA 17) runs 66.72 miles (107.38 km) in a north–south direction from the junction of US 425/LA 15, LA 4, and LA 130 in Winnsboro, Franklin Parish to the Arkansas state line at Kilbourne, West Carroll Parish.

== Louisiana Highway 18 ==
Louisiana Highway 18
- Location: Donaldsonville–Gretna
- Length: 80.118 mi (128.937 km)
- Existed: 1955–present

Louisiana Highway 18 (LA 18) runs 80.12 miles (128.94 km) in an east–west direction from the junction of LA 1 and LA 3089 in Donaldsonville, Ascension Parish to the junction of US 90 Bus. and LA 23 in Gretna, Jefferson Parish.

== Louisiana Highway 19 ==
Louisiana Highway 19
- Location: Baton Rouge–Norwood
- Length: 33.897 mi (54.552 km)
- Existed: 1955–present

Louisiana Highway 19 (LA 19) runs 33.90 miles (54.56 km) in a north–south direction from US 61 in Baton Rouge, East Baton Rouge Parish to the Mississippi state line north of Norwood, East Feliciana Parish.

== Louisiana Highway 20 ==
Louisiana Highway 20
- Location: Gibson–Vacherie
- Length: 36.656 mi (58.992 km)
- Existed: 1955–present

Louisiana Highway 20 (LA 20) runs 36.66 miles (59.00 km) in a southwest to northeast direction from LA 182 in Gibson, Terrebonne Parish to LA 18 in Vacherie, St. James Parish.

== Louisiana Highway 21 ==
Louisiana Highway 21
- Location: Madisonville–Angie
- Length: 52.023 mi (83.723 km)
- Existed: 1955–present

Louisiana Highway 21 (LA 21) runs 52.02 miles (83.72 km) in a north–south direction from the junction of LA 22 and LA 1077 in Madisonville, St. Tammany Parish to the Mississippi state line north of Angie, Washington Parish.

== Louisiana Highway 22 ==
Louisiana Highway 22
- Location: Darrow–Mandeville
- Length: 71.239 mi (114.648 km)
- Existed: 1955–present

Louisiana Highway 22 (LA 22) runs 71.24 miles (114.65 km) in an east–west direction from the junction of LA 75 and LA 942 in Darrow, Ascension Parish to US 190 in Mandeville, St. Tammany Parish.

== Louisiana Highway 23 ==
Louisiana Highway 23
- Location: Venice–Gretna
- Length: 73.638 mi (118.509 km)
- Existed: 1955–present

Louisiana Highway 23 (LA 23) runs 73.64 miles (118.51 km) in a southeast to northwest direction from Jump Basin Road in Venice, Plaquemines Parish to a junction with LA 428 in Gretna, Jefferson Parish.

== Louisiana Highway 24 ==
Louisiana Highway 24
- Location: Schriever–Larose
- Length: 35.667 mi (57.400 km)
- Existed: 1955–present

Louisiana Highway 24 (LA 24) runs 35.67 miles (57.41 km) in a general east–west direction from LA 20 in Schriever, Terrebonne Parish to LA 3235 in Larose, Lafourche Parish.

== Louisiana Highway 25 ==
Louisiana Highway 25
- Location: Covington–Warnerton
- Length: 38.720 mi (62.314 km)
- Existed: 1955–present

Louisiana Highway 25 (LA 25) runs 38.72 miles (62.31 km) in a north–south direction from US 190 in Covington, St. Tammany Parish to the Mississippi state line north of Warnerton, Washington Parish.

== Louisiana Highway 26 ==
Louisiana Highway 26
- Location: DeRidder–Lake Arthur
- Length: 75.911 mi (122.167 km)
- Existed: 1955–present

Louisiana Highway 26 (LA 26) runs 75.91 miles (122.17 km) in a northwest to southeast direction from the concurrent US 171/US 190 southeast of DeRidder, Beauregard Parish to LA 14 in Lake Arthur, Jefferson Davis Parish.

== Louisiana Highway 27 ==
Louisiana Highway 27
- Location: Holmwood–DeRidder
- Length: 132.424 mi (213.116 km)
- Existed: 1955–present

Louisiana Highway 27 (LA 27) runs 132.42 miles (213.11 km) in a general southeast to northwest direction from LA 14 at Holmwood, Calcasieu Parish to the junction of US 171 and US 190 in DeRidder, Beauregard Parish.

== Louisiana Highway 28 ==
Louisiana Highway 28
- Location: Leesville–Archie
- Length: 87.347 mi (140.571 km)
- Existed: 1955–present

Louisiana Highway 28 (LA 28) runs 87.35 miles (140.58 km) in an east–west direction from the junction of US 171 and LA 8 in Leesville, Vernon Parish to US 84 west of Jonesville, Catahoula Parish.

== Louisiana Highway 29 ==
Louisiana Highway 29
- Location: Eunice–Moreauville
- Length: 54.141 mi (87.131 km)
- Existed: 1955–present

Louisiana Highway 29 (LA 29) runs 54.14 miles (87.13 km) in a north–south direction from LA 13 north of Eunice, St. Landry Parish to LA 114 west of Moreauville, Avoyelles Parish.

== Louisiana Highway 30 ==
Louisiana Highway 30
- Location: Baton Rouge–Gonzales
- Length: 27.842 mi (44.807 km)
- Existed: 1955–present

Louisiana Highway 30 (LA 30) runs 27.84 miles (44.80 km) in a northwest to southeast direction from a point near I-10 in Baton Rouge, East Baton Rouge Parish to the junction of US 61 and LA 431 east of Gonzales, Ascension Parish.

== Louisiana Highway 31 ==
Louisiana Highway 31
- Location: New Iberia–Opelousas
- Length: 54.557 mi (87.801 km)
- Existed: 1955–present

Louisiana Highway 31 (LA 31) runs 54.56 miles (87.81 km) in a north–south direction from LA 182 in New Iberia, Iberia Parish to a second junction with LA 182 in Opelousas, St. Landry Parish.

== Louisiana Highway 32 ==
Louisiana Highway 32
- Location: Baton Rouge
- Length: 0.5 mi (800 m)
- Existed: 1955–c. 1957

Louisiana Highway 32 (LA 32) ran 0.5 miles (0.80 km) in a north–south direction along North Third Street from LA 30 to the Louisiana State Capitol building in Baton Rouge.

The entire highway was in Baton Rouge, East Baton Rouge Parish.

| mi | km | Destinations | Notes |
|---|---|---|---|
| 0.0 | 0.0 | LA 30 (Florida Boulevard) | Southern terminus |
| 0.5 | 0.80 | End state maintenance at Louisiana State Capitol building | Northern terminus |
1.000 mi = 1.609 km; 1.000 km = 0.621 mi

Browse numbered routes
| ← LA 31 | → LA 33 |

== Louisiana Highway 33 ==
Louisiana Highway 33
- Location: Ruston–Sadie
- Length: 43.901 mi (70.652 km)
- Existed: 1955–present

Louisiana Highway 33 (LA 33) runs 43.90 miles (70.65 km) in a north–south direction from US 80 in Ruston, Lincoln Parish to the Arkansas state line north of Marion, Union Parish.

== Louisiana Highway 34 ==
Louisiana Highway 34
- Location: Montgomery–West Monroe
- Length: 86.010 mi (138.420 km)
- Existed: 1955–present

Louisiana Highway 34 (LA 34) runs 86.01 miles (138.42 km) in a north–south direction from the junction of US 71 and LA 1239-2 in Montgomery, Grant Parish to the concurrent US 80/LA 15 in West Monroe, Ouachita Parish.

== Louisiana Highway 35 ==
Louisiana Highway 35
- Location: Forked Island–Lawtell
- Length: 52.197 mi (84.003 km)
- Existed: 1955–present

Louisiana Highway 35 (LA 35) runs 52.20 miles (84.01 km) in a north–south direction from LA 82 north of Forked Island, Vermilion Parish to US 190 in Lawtell, St. Landry Parish.

== Louisiana Highway 36 ==
Louisiana Highway 36
- Location: Covington–Hickory
- Length: 18.939 mi (30.479 km)
- Existed: 1955–present

Louisiana Highway 36 (LA 36) runs 18.94 miles (30.48 km) in an east–west direction from LA 21 east of Covington to LA 41 northwest of Pearl River, St. Tammany Parish.

== Louisiana Highway 37 ==
Louisiana Highway 37
- Location: Baton Rouge–Greensburg
- Length: 42.687 mi (68.698 km)
- Existed: 1955–present

Louisiana Highway 37 (LA 37) runs 42.69 miles (68.70 km) in a southwest to northeast direction from the concurrent US 61/US 190 in Baton Rouge, East Baton Rouge Parish to LA 10 in Greensburg, St. Helena Parish.

== Louisiana Highway 38 ==
Louisiana Highway 38
- Location: Coleman Town–Hackley
- Length: 48.573 mi (78.171 km)
- Existed: 1955–present

Louisiana Highway 38 (LA 38) runs 48.573 miles (78.171 km) in an east–west direction from LA 10 in Coleman Town, St. Helena Parish to LA 430 south of Hackley, Washington Parish.

== Louisiana Highway 39 ==
Louisiana Highway 39
- Location: Pointe à la Hache–New Orleans
- Length: 54.327 mi (87.431 km)
- Existed: 1955–present

Louisiana Highway 39 (LA 39) runs 54.33 miles (87.44 km) in a general north–south direction from a local road southeast of Pointe à la Hache, Plaquemines Parish to I-10 in New Orleans, Orleans Parish.

== Louisiana Highway 40 ==
Louisiana Highway 40
- Location: Montpelier–Bush
- Length: 53.282 mi (85.749 km)
- Existed: 1955–present

Louisiana Highway 40 (LA 40) runs 53.28 miles (85.75 km) in an east–west direction from LA 43 southeast of Montpelier, Livingston Parish to LA 41 in Bush, St. Tammany Parish.

== Louisiana Highway 41 ==
Louisiana Highway 41
- Location: Pearl River–Bush
- Length: 23.074 mi (37.134 km)
- Existed: 1955–present

Louisiana Highway 41 (LA 41) runs 23.07 miles (37.13 km) in a north–south direction from the junction of US 11 and LA 3081 in Pearl River to LA 21 in Bush, St. Tammany Parish.

== Louisiana Highway 42 ==
Louisiana Highway 42
- Location: Baton Rouge–Springfield
- Length: 47.880 mi (77.055 km)
- Existed: 1955–present

Louisiana Highway 42 (LA 42) runs 47.88 miles (77.06 km) in an east–west direction from LA 30 in Baton Rouge, East Baton Rouge Parish to the junction of LA 22 and LA 1037 in Springfield, Livingston Parish.

== Louisiana Highway 43 ==
Louisiana Highway 43
- Location: Springfield–Easleyville
- Length: 44.380 mi (71.423 km)
- Existed: 1955–present

Louisiana Highway 43 (LA 43) runs 44.38 miles (71.42 km) in a north–south direction from LA 42 west of Springfield, Livingston Parish to the Mississippi state line north of Easleyville, St. Helena Parish.

== Louisiana Highway 44 ==
Louisiana Highway 44
- Location: Prairieville–LaPlace
- Length: 49.970 mi (80.419 km)
- Existed: 1955–present

Louisiana Highway 44 (LA 44) runs 49.97 miles (80.42 km) in a general east–west direction from LA 42 in Prairieville, Ascension Parish to US 61 in LaPlace, St. John the Baptist Parish.

== Louisiana Highway 45 ==
Louisiana Highway 45
- Location: Lafitte–Marrero
- Length: 22.602 mi (36.374 km)
- Existed: 1955–present

Louisiana Highway 45 (LA 45) runs 22.60 miles (36.37 km) in a north–south direction from a dead end in Lafitte to a junction with LA 18 in Marrero, Jefferson Parish.

== Louisiana Highway 46 ==
Louisiana Highway 46
- Location: New Orleans–Shell Beach
- Length: 29.535 mi (47.532 km)
- Existed: 1955–present

Louisiana Highway 46 (LA 46) runs 29.54 miles (47.54 km) in an east–west direction from the junction of LA 39 and LA 3021 in New Orleans, Orleans Parish to a dead end in Shell Beach, St. Bernard Parish.

== Louisiana Highway 47 ==
Louisiana Highway 47
- Location: Chalmette–New Orleans
- Length: 16.305 mi (26.240 km)
- Existed: 1955–present

Louisiana Highway 47 (LA 47) runs 16.31 miles (26.25 km) in a general southeast to northwest direction from a local road in Chalmette, St. Bernard Parish to the junction of two local roads in New Orleans, Orleans Parish.

== Louisiana Highway 48 ==
Louisiana Highway 48
- Location: Norco–Elmwood
- Length: 20.960 mi (33.732 km)
- Existed: 1955–present

Louisiana Highway 48 (LA 48) runs 20.96 miles (33.73 km) in an east–west direction from US 61 in Norco, St. Charles Parish to the junction of US 90 and LA 3152 in Elmwood, Jefferson Parish.

== Louisiana Highway 49 ==
Louisiana Highway 49
- Location: Kenner
- Length: 3.916 mi (6.302 km)
- Existed: 1955–present

Louisiana Highway 49 (LA 49) runs 3.92 miles (6.31 km) in a general north–south direction from US 61 to the junction of two local roads in Kenner, Jefferson Parish.

== Louisiana Highway 50 ==
Louisiana Highway 50
- Location: St. Rose
- Length: 0.850 mi (1,368 m)
- Existed: 1955–present

Louisiana Highway 50 (LA 50) runs 0.85 miles (1.37 km) in a north–south direction along Almedia Road in St. Rose, St. Charles Parish.

The route heads northward from an intersection with LA 48 (River Road) at the Mississippi River, crossing both the Canadian National Railway (CN) and Kansas City Southern Railway (KCS) tracks at grade, to a point on US 61 (Airline Highway) just east of an interchange with I-310. It is an undivided two-lane highway for its entire length.

LA 50 was created in the 1955 Louisiana Highway renumbering, and its route has remained the same to the present day.

The entire highway is in St. Rose, St. Charles Parish.

| mi | km | Destinations | Notes |
|---|---|---|---|
| 0.000 | 0.000 | LA 48 (River Road) – Kenner, Destrehan | Southern terminus |
| 0.850 | 1.368 | US 61 (Airline Highway) – New Orleans, Baton Rouge | Northern terminus |
1.000 mi = 1.609 km; 1.000 km = 0.621 mi

Browse numbered routes
| ← LA 49 | → US 51 |

== Louisiana Highway 52 ==
Louisiana Highway 52
- Location: Boutte–Luling
- Length: 2.731 mi (4.395 km)
- Existed: 1955–present

Louisiana Highway 52 (LA 52) runs 2.73 miles (4.39 km) in a north–south direction from the junction of US 90 and LA 633 in Boutte to LA 18 in Luling, St. Charles Parish.

== Louisiana Highway 53 ==
Louisiana Highway 53
- Location: Reserve
- Length: 1.634 mi (2.630 km)
- Existed: 1955–present

Louisiana Highway 53 (LA 53) runs 1.63 miles (2.62 km) in a north–south direction along Central Avenue in Reserve, St. John the Baptist Parish.

The route begins at the intersection of LA 44 (River Road) and LA 640 opposite the defunct Edgard–Reserve Ferry landing at the Mississippi River. It proceeds northward along Central Avenue, crossing both the Canadian National Railway (CN) and Kansas City Southern Railway (KCS) tracks at grade, to a junction with US 61 (West Airline Highway). LA 53 is an undivided two-lane highway for its entire length.

LA 53 was created in the 1955 Louisiana Highway renumbering, and its route has remained the same to the present day.

The entire highway is in Reserve, St. John the Baptist Parish.

| mi | km | Destinations | Notes |
|---|---|---|---|
| 0.000 | 0.000 | LA 44 (River Road); LA 640 | Southern terminus of LA 53; northern terminus of LA 640 |
| 1.634 | 2.630 | US 61 (West Airline Highway) – New Orleans, Baton Rouge | Northern terminus |
1.000 mi = 1.609 km; 1.000 km = 0.621 mi

Browse numbered routes
| ← LA 52 | → LA 54 |

== Louisiana Highway 54 ==
Louisiana Highway 54
- Location: Garyville
- Length: 2.343 mi (3.771 km)
- Existed: 1955–present

Louisiana Highway 54 (LA 54) runs 2.34 miles (3.77 km) in a north–south direction from LA 44 to US 61 in Garyville, St. John the Baptist Parish.

== Louisiana Highway 55 ==
Louisiana Highway 55
- Location: Montegut–Bourg
- Length: 14.094 mi (22.682 km)
- Existed: 1955–present

Louisiana Highway 55 (LA 55) runs 14.09 miles (22.68 km) in a north–south direction from a dead end south of Montegut to a junction with LA 24 in Bourg, Terrebonne Parish.

== Louisiana Highway 56 ==
Louisiana Highway 56
- Location: Terrebonne Parish
- Length: 25.495 mi (41.030 km)
- Existed: 1955–present

Louisiana Highway 56 (LA 56) runs 25.50 miles (41.04 km) in a north–south direction from a local road in Cocodrie to a junction with LA 24 in Houma, Terrebonne Parish.

The route heads north from Cocodrie and follows Little Caillou Road along the west bank of Bayou Petit Caillou. It intersects the southern terminus of LA 57 (Bayou Sale Road) and proceeds north, eventually crossing a swing bridge over a canal connecting with Lake Boudreaux. LA 56 passes through the community of Chauvin and intersects LA 58 (Sarah Road), a short connector to the parallel LA 55 at Montegut. Curving to the northwest, LA 56 skirts the Houma city limits and becomes known as East Main Street. The route proceeds a short distance further to a T-intersection with LA 24 next to the Houma–Terrebonne Airport in an area known as Presque Isle. LA 56 is an undivided two-lane highway for its entire length.

The entire highway is in Terrebonne Parish.

| Location | mi | km | Destinations | Notes |
|---|---|---|---|---|
| Cocodrie | 0.000 | 0.000 | Begin state maintenance on Little Caillou Road | Southern terminus |
| | 4.608 | 7.416 | LA 57 (Bayou Sale Road) – Dulac, Houma | Southern terminus of LA 57 |
| | 10.397– 10.450 | 16.732– 16.818 | Bridge over Boudreaux Canal | |
| Chauvin | 17.719 | 28.516 | LA 58 (Sarah Road) – Montegut | Western terminus of LA 58 |
| Houma | 25.495 | 41.030 | LA 24 west (East Main Street) – Houma LA 24 east – Bourg, Montegut | Northern terminus; location also known as Presque Isle |
1.000 mi = 1.609 km; 1.000 km = 0.621 mi

Browse numbered routes
| ← LA 55 | → LA 57 |

== Louisiana Highway 57 ==
Louisiana Highway 57
- Location: Terrebonne Parish
- Length: 25.053 mi (40.319 km)
- Existed: 1955–present

Louisiana Highway 57 (LA 57) runs 25.05 miles (40.31 km) in a north–south direction from LA 56 north of Cocodrie to LA 24 in Houma, Terrebonne Parish.

== Louisiana Highway 58 ==
Louisiana Highway 58
- Location: Terrebonne Parish
- Length: 1.614 mi (2.597 km)
- Existed: 1955–present

Louisiana Highway 58 (LA 58) runs 1.61 miles (2.59 km) in an east–west direction along Sarah Road, a short connector between LA 56 in Chauvin and LA 55 in Montegut, Terrebonne Parish.

LA 56 and LA 55 travel along opposite banks of Bayou Terrebonne and Bayou Petit Caillou, respectively. LA 58 crosses a vertical lift bridge over each waterway to connect the two highways southeast of Houma. It is an undivided two-lane highway for its entire length.

In the pre-1955 state highway system, LA 58 was designated as State Route 969. LA 58 was created in the 1955 Louisiana Highway renumbering, and its route has remained the same to the present day.

The entire highway is in Terrebonne Parish.

| Location | mi | km | Destinations | Notes |
|---|---|---|---|---|
| Chauvin | 0.000 | 0.000 | LA 56 (Little Caillou Road) – Chauvin, Houma | Western terminus |
| Chauvin | 0.007– 0.037 | 0.011– 0.060 | Bridge over Bayou Petit Caillou | |
| Montegut | 1.572– 1.603 | 2.530– 2.580 | Bridge over Bayou Terrebonne | |
| Montegut | 1.614 | 2.597 | LA 55 (Montegut Road) – Montegut, Bourg | Eastern terminus |
1.000 mi = 1.609 km; 1.000 km = 0.621 mi

Browse numbered routes
| ← LA 57 | → I-59 |

== Louisiana Highway 59 ==
Louisiana Highway 59
- Location: Mandeville–Abita Springs
- Length: 11.793 mi (18.979 km)
- Existed: 1955–present

Louisiana Highway 59 (LA 59) runs 11.79 miles (18.97 km) in a north–south direction from US 190 in Mandeville to LA 21 north of Abita Springs, St. Tammany Parish.

== Louisiana Highway 60 ==
Louisiana Highway 60
- Location: Enon–Bogalusa
- Length: 16.047 mi (25.825 km)
- Existed: 1955–present

Louisiana Highway 60 (LA 60) runs 16.05 miles (25.83 km) in an east–west direction from LA 16 in Enon to LA 10 in Bogalusa, Washington Parish.

The highway follows a winding rural alignment northeast from Enon. The route intersects LA 1072 at Plainview, connecting with Franklinton Airport. Proceeding eastward, LA 60 makes a right-angle turn northward to a T-intersection with LA 439. The route turns east into Bogalusa, where it becomes known as West 10th Street, and makes several zigzags through the city's street grid: north onto Avenue K, east onto the continuation of West 10th Street, north onto Avenue F, east onto West 9th Street, and finally north onto Avenue B. The roadway widens first to a divided two-lane highway then to an undivided four-lane highway as the surroundings transition from residential to commercial. After passing Bogalusa High School, LA 60 narrows to two lanes once again and crosses the Bogue Lusa Creek onto Cumberland Street. Cumberland Street soon branches off to the northeast, and LA 60 proceeds due north on Shenandoah Street a short distance to its terminus at LA 10 (Superior Avenue), the city's main east–west thoroughfare.

The entire highway is in Washington Parish.

| Location | mi | km | Destinations | Notes |
|---|---|---|---|---|
| Enon | 0.000 | 0.000 | LA 16 – Franklinton, Sun | Western terminus |
| | 3.006 | 4.838 | LA 1073 south | Northern terminus of LA 1073 |
| Plainview | 7.417 | 11.937 | LA 1072 west – Franklinton | Eastern terminus of LA 1072; to Franklinton Airport |
| | 13.254 | 21.330 | LA 439 north | Southern terminus of LA 439 |
| Bogalusa | 16.047 | 25.825 | LA 10 (Superior Avenue) | Eastern terminus |
1.000 mi = 1.609 km; 1.000 km = 0.621 mi

Browse numbered routes
| ← LA 59 | → US 61 |

== Louisiana Highway 62 ==
Louisiana Highway 62
- Location: Washington Parish
- Length: 11.863 mi (19.092 km)
- Existed: 1955–present

Louisiana Highway 62 (LA 62) runs 11.86 miles (19.09 km) in a north–south direction from LA 10 in Sheridan to the Mississippi state line north of State Line, Washington Parish.

== Louisiana Highway 63 ==
Louisiana Highway 63
- Location: Verdun–Clinton
- Length: 52.48 mi (84.46 km)
- Existed: 1955–present

Louisiana Highway 63 (LA 63) runs 52.48 miles (84.46 km) in a north–south direction from LA 444 east of French Settlement, Livingston Parish to LA 67 in Clinton, East Feliciana Parish.

The route begins at a four-way intersection with LA 444 and Old Frost Road. From here, LA 63 heads north along Frost Road on an undivided two-lane highway and traverses forest for 4.5 miles (7.2 km) before reaching an intersection with LA 42 east of Colyell. 4.7 miles (7.6 km) later, LA 63 comes to an interchange with I-12 (exit 22) and briefly becomes a divided two-lane highway to accommodate the interchange. At this interchange, LA 63 enters the town of Livingston. Shortly after passing through the town center, LA 63 makes a brief jog west onto US 190 (Florida Boulevard) before continuing its northward trajectory. At this point, LA 63 has gained the local name of North Range Road and heads north for 4.7 miles (7.6 km) before intersecting the western terminus of LA 442, which heads east to Tickfaw. Shortly after this intersection, LA 63 makes several curves before intersecting LA 449, with which it has a brief concurrency. At an intersection with LA 1019, LA 1019 continues the route west while LA 63 turns to the northwest, intersecting routes such as LA 447 and LA 1023, heading west before coming to an intersection with LA 16. From this intersection, LA 63 begins a 6.3 miles (10.1 km) concurrency with LA 16 before splitting off to the north west of Pine Grove. After 3.7 miles (6.0 km), LA 63 comes to an intersection with LA 37, running concurrent with the route for 1.4 miles (2.3 km) before splitting off to the north again, curving to the northwest at an intersection with LA 960. Shortly after, LA 63 intersects LA 959. LA 63 continues northwest for a final 10.4 miles (16.7 km) before coming to its northern terminus at LA 67 in Clinton.

| Parish | Location | mi | km | Destinations | Notes |
|---|---|---|---|---|---|
| Livingston | Verdun | 0.0 | 0.0 | LA 444 | Southern terminus |
| Livingston | Frost | 4.5 | 7.2 | LA 42 – Colyell, Port Vincent, Springfield | |
| Livingston | Livingston | 9.2– 9.5 | 14.8– 15.3 | I-12 – Baton Rouge, Hammond | I-12 exit 22 |
| Livingston | Livingston | 11.4 | 18.3 | US 190 east – Hammond | South end of US 190 concurrency |
| Livingston | Livingston | 11.6 | 18.7 | US 190 west – Baton Rouge | North end of US 190 concurrency |
| Livingston | | 16.4 | 26.4 | LA 442 east | West terminus of LA 442 |
| Livingston | | 21.1 | 34.0 | LA 449 south | South end of LA 449 concurrency |
| Livingston | | 21.2 | 34.1 | LA 449 north | North end of LA 449 concurrency |
| Livingston | | 22.2 | 35.7 | LA 1019 west | East terminus of LA 1019 |
| Livingston | | 24.6 | 39.6 | LA 447 south | North terminus of LA 447 |
| Livingston | | 25.7 | 41.4 | LA 1023 south | North terminus of LA 1023 |
| Livingston | Weiss | 27.9 | 44.9 | LA 16 west | South end of LA 16 concurrency |
| St. Helena | | 34.2 | 55.0 | LA 16 east | North end of LA 16 concurrency |
| St. Helena | Grangeville | 37.9 | 61.0 | LA 37 east | South end of LA 37 concurrency |
| East Feliciana | | 39.3 | 63.2 | LA 37 west | North end of LA 37 concurrency |
| East Feliciana | | 40.6 | 65.3 | LA 960 north | South terminus of LA 960 |
| East Feliciana | Bluff Creek | 42.1 | 67.8 | LA 959 west | East terminus of LA 959 |
| East Feliciana | Clinton | 52.3 | 84.2 | LA 67 | Northern terminus |
1.000 mi = 1.609 km; 1.000 km = 0.621 mi

== Louisiana Highway 64 ==
Louisiana Highway 64
- Location: Zachary–Denham Springs
- Length: 20.355 mi (32.758 km)
- Existed: 1955–present

Louisiana Highway 64 (LA 64) runs 20.36 miles (32.77 km) in a general east–west direction from LA 964 in Zachary, East Baton Rouge Parish to the junction of LA 16 and LA 1026 north of Denham Springs, Livingston Parish.

== Louisiana Highway 66 ==
Louisiana Highway 66
- Location: West Feliciana Parish
- Length: 19.620 mi (31.575 km)
- Existed: 1955–present

Louisiana Highway 66 (LA 66) runs 19.62 miles (31.58 km) in a general northwest to southeast direction from the main entrance of the Louisiana State Penitentiary at Angola to a junction with US 61 north of St. Francisville, West Feliciana Parish.

== Louisiana Highway 67 ==
Louisiana Highway 67
- Location: Baton Rouge–Felps
- Length: 43.60 mi (70.17 km)
- Existed: 1955–present

Louisiana Highway 67 (LA 67) runs 43.60 miles (70.17 km) in a north–south direction from LA 73 in Baton Rouge, East Baton Rouge Parish to the Mississippi state line north of Clinton, East Feliciana Parish. The route continues across the state line as Mississippi Highway 569. As of 2018, the section of LA 67 south of US 190 is under agreement to be removed from the state highway system and transferred to local control.

LA 67 begins at an intersection with LA 73 (Government Street) in Baton Rouge near the Garden District neighborhood. The highway travels north along 22nd Street and intersects US 61 Bus. / US 190 Bus. (Florida Street) near the Baton Rouge National Cemetery. LA 67 crosses over I-110 near BREC Memorial Stadium, turns northeast onto Plank Road, then crosses under I-110. The highway continues to travel along Plank Road, traversing through heavily developed areas of Baton Rouge. Between LA 408 and Blount Road, LA 67 serves as the eastern boundary for the Baton Rouge Metropolitan Airport. The highway enters Brownfields near Blount Road then enters Baker near LA 423, with the route becoming more suburban. LA 67 leaves Baker near Bentley Drive, with the highway traversing more rural areas of East Baton Rouge Parish.

| Parish | Location | mi | km | Destinations | Notes |
|---|---|---|---|---|---|
| East Baton Rouge | Baton Rouge | 0.0 | 0.0 | LA 73 (Government Street) | Southern terminus |
| East Baton Rouge | Baton Rouge | 0.4 | 0.64 | US 61 Bus. / US 190 Bus. (Florida Street) | |
| East Baton Rouge | Baton Rouge | 1.0 | 1.6 | I-110 | I-110 exit 2B; no access from northbound I-110 |
| East Baton Rouge | Baton Rouge | 4.6 | 7.4 | US 61 / US 190 (Airline Highway) | Interchange |
| East Baton Rouge | Baton Rouge | 5.6 | 9.0 | LA 408 (Harding Boulevard / Hooper Road) | |
| East Baton Rouge | Baker | 8.3 | 13.4 | LA 423 west (Thomas Road) / Comite Drive | Eastern terminus of LA 423 |
| East Baton Rouge | Baker | 9.5 | 15.3 | LA 3006 west (Lavey Lane) | Eastern terminus of LA 3006 |
| East Baton Rouge | Zachary | 14.7 | 23.7 | LA 64 – Zachary | |
| East Feliciana | | 21.2 | 34.1 | LA 412 west – Slaughter | Eastern terminus of LA 412 |
| East Feliciana | | 24.1 | 38.8 | LA 959 east | Western terminus of LA 959 |
| East Feliciana | Clinton | 30.7 | 49.4 | LA 63 south | Northern terminus of LA 63 |
| East Feliciana | Clinton | 31.9 | 51.3 | LA 10 east – Greensburg | South end of LA 10 concurrency |
| East Feliciana | Clinton | 32.1 | 51.7 | LA 10 west – Jackson | North end of LA 10 concurrency |
| East Feliciana | | 39.7 | 63.9 | LA 432 east | Western terminus of LA 432 |
| East Feliciana | | 42.1 | 67.8 | LA 422 west | Eastern terminus of LA 422 |
| East Feliciana | | 43.6 | 70.2 | MS 569 north – Liberty | Northern terminus; Mississippi state line |
1.000 mi = 1.609 km; 1.000 km = 0.621 mi: Concurrency terminus; Incomplete access

== Louisiana Highway 68 ==
Louisiana Highway 68
- Location: East Feliciana Parish
- Length: 19.252 mi (30.983 km)
- Existed: 1955–present

Louisiana Highway 68 (LA 68) runs 19.25 miles (30.98 km) in a north–south direction from US 61 north of Port Hudson to LA 19 in Wilson, East Feliciana Parish.

== Louisiana Highway 69 ==
Louisiana Highway 69
- Location: Grand Bayou–White Castle
- Length: 15.381 mi (24.753 km)
- Existed: 1955–present

Louisiana Highway 69 (LA 69) runs 15.38 miles (24.75 km) in a north–south direction from LA 70 in Grand Bayou, Assumption Parish to LA 1 northwest of White Castle, Iberville Parish.

== Louisiana Highway 70 ==
Louisiana Highway 70
- Location: Morgan City–Sorrento
- Length: 51.084 mi (82.212 km)
- Existed: 1955–present

Louisiana Highway 70 (LA 70) runs 51.08 miles (82.21 km) in a north–south direction from the junction of US 90, US 90 Bus., and LA 182 in Morgan City, St. Mary Parish to LA 22 in Sorrento, Ascension Parish.

== Louisiana Highway 72 ==
Louisiana Highway 72
- Location: Bossier City
- Length: 1.856 mi (2.987 km)
- Existed: 1955–present

Louisiana Highway 72 (LA 72) runs 1.86 miles (2.99 km) in an east–west direction from a junction with LA 3, I-20, and US 71 to a junction with the concurrent US 79/US 80 in Bossier City, Bossier Parish.

== Louisiana Highway 73 ==
Louisiana Highway 73
- Location: Geismar–Baton Rouge
- Length: 26.318 mi (42.355 km)
- Existed: 1955–present

Louisiana Highway 73 (LA 73) runs 26.32 miles (42.36 km) in a general north–south direction from LA 75 in Geismar, Ascension Parish to LA 30 in Baton Rouge, East Baton Rouge Parish.

== Louisiana Highway 74 ==
Louisiana Highway 74
- Location: St. Gabriel–Gonzales
- Length: 10.683 mi (17.193 km)
- Existed: 1955–present

Louisiana Highway 74 (LA 74) runs 10.68 miles (17.19 km) in an east–west direction from LA 75 in St. Gabriel, Iberville Parish to US 61 north of Gonzales, Ascension Parish.

== Louisiana Highway 75 ==
Louisiana Highway 75
- Location: Bayou Pigeon–Darrow
- Length: 46.703 mi (75.161 km)
- Existed: 1955–present

Louisiana Highway 75 (LA 75) runs 46.70 miles (75.16 km) in a general east–west direction from a dead end in Bayou Pigeon, Iberville Parish to the junction of LA 22 and LA 942 in Darrow, Ascension Parish.

== Louisiana Highway 76 ==
Louisiana Highway 76
- Location: Maringouin–Port Allen
- Length: 25.477 mi (41.001 km)
- Existed: 1955–present

Louisiana Highway 76 (LA 76) runs 25.48 miles (41.01 km) in an east–west direction from LA 77 in Maringouin, Iberville Parish to the junction of LA 1 and LA 987-4 in Port Allen, West Baton Rouge Parish.

== Louisiana Highway 77 ==
Louisiana Highway 77
- Location: Plaquemine–Ravenswood
- Length: 49.136 mi (79.077 km)
- Existed: 1955–present

Louisiana Highway 77 (LA 77) runs 49.14 miles (79.08 km) in a north–south direction from LA 1 in Plaquemine, Iberville Parish to LA 10 north of Fordoche, Pointe Coupee Parish.

== Louisiana Highway 78 ==
Louisiana Highway 78
- Location: Pointe Coupee Parish
- Length: 7.558 mi (12.163 km)
- Existed: 1955–present

Louisiana Highway 78 (LA 78) runs 7.56 miles (12.17 km) in a north–south direction from the junction of US 190 and LA 411 in Livonia to LA 1 in Parlange, Pointe Coupee Parish.

== Louisiana Highway 81 ==
Louisiana Highway 81
- Location: Pointe Coupee Parish
- Length: 8.825 mi (14.202 km)
- Existed: 1955–present

Louisiana Highway 81 (LA 81) runs 8.83 miles (14.21 km) in a general southeast to northwest direction from LA 77 in Livonia to a second junction with LA 77 in Fordoche, Pointe Coupee Parish.

== Louisiana Highway 82 ==
Louisiana Highway 82
- Location: Sabine Pass–Abbeville
- Length: 143.139 mi (230.360 km)
- Existed: 1955–present

Louisiana Highway 82 (LA 82) runs 143.14 miles (230.36 km) in a general east–west direction from the Texas state line west of Cameron, Cameron Parish to the Vermilion–Lafayette parish line southwest of Youngsville.

== Louisiana Highway 83 ==
Louisiana Highway 83
- Location: New Iberia–Baldwin
- Length: 34.013 mi (54.739 km)
- Existed: 1955–present

Louisiana Highway 83 (LA 83) runs 34.01 miles (54.73 km) in a general east–west direction from LA 14 in New Iberia, Iberia Parish to LA 182 in Baldwin, St. Mary Parish.

== Louisiana Highway 85 ==
Louisiana Highway 85
- Location: Iberia Parish
- Length: 7.826 mi (12.595 km)
- Existed: 1955–present

Louisiana Highway 85 (LA 85) runs 7.83 miles (12.60 km) in an east–west direction from LA 83 in Lydia to LA 182 in Jeanerette, Iberia Parish.

== Louisiana Highway 86 ==
Louisiana Highway 86
- Location: New Iberia
- Length: 16.436 mi (26.451 km)
- Existed: 1955–present

Louisiana Highway 86 (LA 86) runs 16.44 miles (26.46 km) in a general north–south direction from LA 182 in New Iberia to LA 31 north of New Iberia, Iberia Parish.

== Louisiana Highway 87 ==
Louisiana Highway 87
- Location: New Iberia–Centerville
- Length: 42.011 mi (67.610 km)
- Existed: 1955–present

Louisiana Highway 87 (LA 87) runs 42.01 miles (67.61 km) in a northwest to southeast direction from LA 86 in New Iberia, Iberia Parish to a local road north of Centerville, St. Mary Parish.

== Louisiana Highway 88 ==
Louisiana Highway 88
- Location: Iberia Parish
- Length: 5.393 mi (8.679 km)
- Existed: 1955–present

Louisiana Highway 88 (LA 88) runs 5.39 miles (8.67 km) in an east–west direction from LA 89 at Lozes to LA 182 northwest of New Iberia, Iberia Parish.

== Louisiana Highway 89 ==
Louisiana Highway 89
- Location: Delcambre–Youngsville
- Length: 12.731 mi (20.489 km)
- Existed: 1955–present

Louisiana Highway 89 (LA 89) runs 12.731 miles (20.489 km) in a north–south direction from LA 14 in Delcambre, Vermilion Parish to a local road in Youngsville, Lafayette Parish.

There is one hyphenated route, LA 89-1, which runs 5.053 miles (8.132 km) also in a north–south direction from a roundabout at Iberia Street in Youngsville, to US 90/LA 182 on the Lafayette–Broussard municipal boundary.

== Louisiana Highway 91 ==
Louisiana Highway 91
- Location: Florence Landing–Eunice
- Length: 49.58 mi (79.79 km)
- Existed: 1955–present

Louisiana Highway 91 (LA 91) runs 49.58 miles (79.79 km) in a north–south direction from a local road south of Gueydan, Vermilion Parish to LA 13 in Eunice, St. Landry Parish.

== Louisiana Highway 92 ==
Louisiana Highway 92
- Location: Mermentau–Youngsville
- Length: 40.723 mi (65.537 km)
- Existed: 1955–present

Louisiana Highway 92 (LA 92) runs 40.723 miles (65.537 km) in an east–west direction from US 90 east of Mermentau, Acadia Parish to LA 339 in Youngsville, Lafayette Parish.

There is one hyphenated route, LA 92-1, which runs 10.188 miles (16.396 km) also in an east–west direction from the intersection of Iberia Street and Young Street in Youngsville, to LA 347 south of St. Martinville, St. Martin Parish.

== Louisiana Highway 93 ==
Louisiana Highway 93
- Location: Scott–Arnaudville
- Length: 23.427 mi (37.702 km)
- Existed: 1955–present

Louisiana Highway 93 (LA 93) runs 23.427 miles (37.702 km) in a general north–south direction from US 90 in Scott, Lafayette Parish to LA 31 in Arnaudville, St. Martin Parish.

LA 93 has one hyphenated route, known as LA 93-1, which runs 1.819 miles (2.927 km) in a north–south direction along Rue de Belier between LA 342 in Lafayette and a point, less than one mile south of Dulles Road in Scott. This minor route is located entirely within Lafayette Parish.

== Louisiana Highway 94 ==
Louisiana Highway 94
- Location: Lafayette–Breaux Bridge
- Length: 7.943 mi (12.783 km)
- Existed: 1955–present

Louisiana Highway 94 (LA 94) runs 7.94 miles (12.78 km) in a southwest to northeast direction from the junction of US 90 and US 167 in Lafayette, Lafayette Parish to LA 328 in Breaux Bridge, St. Martin Parish.

== Louisiana Highway 95 ==
Louisiana Highway 95
- Location: Duson–Mamou
- Length: 42.12 mi (67.79 km)
- Existed: 1955–present

Louisiana Highway 95 (LA 95) runs 42.12 miles (67.79 km) in a north–south direction from US 90 in Duson, Lafayette Parish to LA 104 in Mamou, Evangeline Parish. A 0.65-mile-long (1.05 km) spur route, LA 95 Spur, provides a shortcut along LA 95 in St. Landry Parish east of Eunice. It connects LA 95 at the south to US 190, LA 95, and LA 758 to the north.

== Louisiana Highway 96 ==
Louisiana Highway 96
- Location: Broussard–Catahoula
- Length: 19.543 mi (31.451 km)
- Existed: 1955–present

Louisiana Highway 96 (LA 96) runs 19.54 miles (31.45 km) in an east–west direction from LA 182 in Broussard, Lafayette Parish to LA 352 east of Catahoula, St. Martin Parish.

== Louisiana Highway 97 ==
Louisiana Highway 97
- Location: Jennings–Basile
- Length: 21.553 mi (34.686 km)
- Existed: 1955–present

Louisiana Highway 97 (LA 97) runs 21.55 miles (34.68 km) in a north–south direction from the junction of US 90 and LA 102 in Jennings, Jefferson Davis Parish to US 190 east of Basile, Acadia Parish.

== Louisiana Highway 98 ==
Louisiana Highway 98
- Location: Iota–Carencro
- Length: 47.751 mi (76.848 km)
- Existed: 1955–present

Louisiana Highway 98 (LA 98) runs 47.75 miles (76.85 km) in an east–west direction from the junction of LA 97 and LA 1123 west of Iota, Acadia Parish to the Lafayette–St. Martin parish line east of Carencro.

== Louisiana Highway 99 ==
Louisiana Highway 99
- Location: Lake Arthur–Kinder
- Length: 32.438 mi (52.204 km)
- Existed: 1955–present

Louisiana Highway 99 (LA 99) runs 32.44 miles (52.21 km) in a north–south direction from LA 14 west of Lake Arthur, Jefferson Davis Parish to US 190 in an area of Allen Parish east of Kinder.
