= Louisiana Highway 57 =

State highway in Louisiana, United States

Louisiana Highway 57

Route information
- Maintained by Louisiana DOTD
- Length: 25.1 mi (40.4 km)
- Existed: 1955 renumbering–present

Major junctions
- South end: LA 56 north of Cocodrie
- LA 661 in Houma; LA 3040 in Houma
- North end: LA 24 in Houma

Location
- Country: United States
- State: Louisiana
- Parishes: Terrebonne

Highway system
- Louisiana State Highway System; Interstate; US; State; Scenic
← LA 56	→ LA 58

Louisiana Highway 57 (LA 57) is a state highway that serves Terrebonne Parish. It runs 25.1 miles (40.4 km) in a south to north direction along Bayou Sale Road and Grand Caillou Road, connecting Cocodrie and Houma.

== Route description ==
From the south, LA 57 begins at an intersection with LA 56 north of Cocodrie. It proceeds west along Bayou Sale Road and makes a brief dip to the south before heading in a general northerly direction for the remainder of its route. In Dulac, LA 57 intersects LA 3011 which proceeds briefly to the southeast along Bayou Caillou. LA 57 then crosses Bayou Dulac and continues north toward Houma on Grand Caillou Road. Traveling alongside the east bank of Bayou Grand Caillou, LA 57 passes through Boudreaux and Ashland. In Houma, LA 57 intersects LA 661 (Van Avenue) which connects to LA 315 south and serves points such as Crozier and Theriot. Two blocks later, LA 57 intersects LA 3040 (East Tunnel Boulevard), a four-lane highway that parallels LA 24 through much of Houma.

LA 57 reaches its northern terminus at LA 24 on Bayou Terrebonne. At this intersection, LA 24 transitions from a four-lane, divided highway on the west, running on either side of the bayou, to a two-lane, undivided highway on the east, running on the west bank of the bayou. Westbound LA 24 traffic transitions to the east bank of the bayou by crossing a bridge ahead of the northern terminus of LA 57.

LA 57 is an undivided, two-lane highway from its southern terminus to an intersection with Thompson Road in Houma. It continues as an undivided, three-lane highway with middle turning lane to East Woodlawn Ranch Road. From there it becomes an undivided five-lane highway until it reaches the intersection of Tunnel Boulevard where the turning lane disappears. It then becomes an undivided, four-lane highway for the remainder of its route.

== Major intersections ==
The entire highway is in Terrebonne Parish.

Location	mi	km	Destinations	Notes
	0.0	0.0	LA 56 (Little Caillou Road) – Cocodrie, Chauvin	Southern terminus
Dulac	7.9	12.7	LA 3011 (Grand Caillou Road)	Northeastern terminus of LA 3011
Dulac	8.0	12.9	Bridge over Bayou Dulac	
Houma	24.3	39.1	LA 661 (North/South Van Avenue)	
Houma	24.4	39.3	LA 3040 (East Tunnel Boulevard)	
Houma	25.1	40.4	LA 24 (East Main Street) – Houma, Larose	Northern terminus
1.000 mi = 1.609 km; 1.000 km = 0.621 mi
