= List of state highways in Louisiana (3000–3049) =

The following is a list of state highways in the U.S. state of Louisiana designated in the 3000–3049 range.

== Louisiana Highway 3000 ==
Louisiana Highway 3000
- Location: Ramah
- Length: 1.354 mi (2.179 km)
- Existed: 1955–present

Louisiana Highway 3000 (LA 3000) runs 1.35 miles (2.17 km) in a north–south direction from a local road in Ramah to LA 76 west of Rosedale. The highway connects LA 76 to I-10 at Exit 135. The route has a spur that travels 0.26 miles (0.42 km) from LA 3000 west to a bridge at the Atchafalaya Basin Floodway levee.

The entire highway is in Iberville Parish.

Location	mi	km	Destinations	Notes
Ramah	0.000	0.000	Begin state maintenance on Ramah Road	Southern terminus
Ramah	0.162– 0.345	0.261– 0.555	I-10 – Baton Rouge, Lafayette	Exit 135 on I-10
Ramah	0.397– 0.420	0.639– 0.676	LA 3000 Spur	Eastern terminus of LA 3000 Spur (signed as LA 3000 south)
	1.354	2.179	LA 76 east (Rosedale Road) to I-10 Alternate Route – Rosedale LA 76 north – Maringouin	Northern terminus
1.000 mi = 1.609 km; 1.000 km = 0.621 mi

== Louisiana Highway 3001 ==
Louisiana Highway 3001
- Location: Goldridge
- Length: 0.89 mi (1,430 m)

Louisiana Highway 3001 (LA 3001) runs 0.89 miles (1.43 km) in Goldridge.

== Louisiana Highway 3002 ==
Louisiana Highway 3002
- Location: Denham Springs
- Length: 2.54 mi (4.09 km)
- Existed: 1955–present

Louisiana Highway 3002 (LA 3002) runs 2.54 miles (4.09 km) in a north–south direction along Range Avenue from LA 1034 to the junction of US 190 and LA 16 in Denham Springs, Livingston Parish.

The entire highway is in Denham Springs, Livingston Parish.

mi	km	Destinations	Notes
0.0	0.0	LA 1034 (Vincent Road)	Southern terminus
0.6	0.97	I-12	Exit 10 on I-12
0.8	1.3	LA 3003 (Rushing Road)	
2.0	3.2	LA 1259	Eastern terminus of LA 1259
2.6	4.2	US 190 (Florida Avenue) / LA 16 (Range Avenue)	Northern terminus
1.000 mi = 1.609 km; 1.000 km = 0.621 mi

== Louisiana Highway 3003 ==
Louisiana Highway 3003
- Location: Denham Springs
- Length: 1.72 mi (2.77 km)
- Existed: 1955–present

Louisiana Highway 3003 (LA 3003) runs 1.72 miles (2.77 km) in an east–west direction from LA 1032 to LA 16 in Denham Springs, Livingston Parish.

From the west, LA 3003 begins at LA 1032 (4-H Club Road) just south of the latter's intersection with US 190. It heads southeast on Rushing Road and intersects LA 3002 (South Range Avenue). LA 3003 continues along the north side of I-12 to its terminus at LA 16 (Pete's Highway).

LA 3003 is an undivided two-lane highway for its entire length.

The entire highway is in Denham Springs, Livingston Parish.

mi	km	Destinations	Notes
0.0	0.0	LA 1032 (4-H Club Road)	Western terminus
1.1	1.8	LA 3002 (South Range Avenue)	
1.7	2.7	LA 16 (Pete's Highway)	Eastern terminus
1.000 mi = 1.609 km; 1.000 km = 0.621 mi

== Louisiana Highway 3005 ==
Louisiana Highway 3005
- Location: Simsboro–Grambling
- Length: 3.55 mi (5.71 km)

Louisiana Highway 3005 (LA 3005) runs 3.55 miles (5.71 km) from Simsboro to Grambling.

== Louisiana Highway 3006 ==
Louisiana Highway 3006
- Location: Baker
- Length: 2.53 mi (4.07 km)
- Existed: 1955–present

Louisiana Highway 3006 (LA 3006) runs 2.53 miles (4.07 km) in an east–west direction along Lavey Lane from LA 19 to LA 67 in Baker, East Baton Rouge Parish.

The entire highway is in Baker, East Baton Rouge Parish.

mi	km	Destinations	Notes
0.0	0.0	LA 19 (Scotland–Zachary Highway, South Main Street)	Western terminus
2.6	4.2	LA 67 (Plank Road)	Eastern terminus
1.000 mi = 1.609 km; 1.000 km = 0.621 mi

== Louisiana Highway 3007 ==
Louisiana Highway 3007
- Location: Ebenezer
- Length: 3.52 mi (5.66 km)

Louisiana Highway 3007 (LA 3007) runs 3.52 miles (5.66 km) in Ebenezer.

The entire highway is in Acadia Parish.

Location	mi	km	Destinations	Notes
Ebenezer	0.0	0.0	LA 13 – Kaplan, Crowley	Western terminus
Ebenezer	3.52	5.66	Ebenezer Road	Eastern terminus
1.000 mi = 1.609 km; 1.000 km = 0.621 mi

== Louisiana Highway 3008 ==
Louisiana Highway 3008
- Location: Webster Parish
- Length: 8.25 mi (13.28 km)

Louisiana Highway 3008 (LA 3008) runs 8.25 miles (13.28 km) in a north–south direction along Dorcheat Road from LA 160 to a bridge over Flat Lick Bayou through Webster Parish.

== Louisiana Highway 3009 ==
Louisiana Highway 3009
- Location: Tensas Parish
- Length: 2.96 mi (4.76 km)

Louisiana Highway 3009 (LA 3009) runs 2.96 miles (4.76 km) in Tensas Parish.

== Louisiana Highway 3011 ==
Louisiana Highway 3011
- Location: Dulac
- Length: 1.50 mi (2.41 km)
- Existed: 1955–present

Louisiana Highway 3011 (LA 3011) runs 1.50 miles (2.41 km) in a north–south direction along Grand Caillou Road in Dulac, Terrebonne Parish.

The route begins at a point where Grand Caillou Road transitions from parish to state maintenance and proceeds northeast along the east bank of Bayou Caillou. It then turns to the east and terminates at LA 57 (Bayou Sale Road). It is an undivided, two-lane highway for its entire length. LA 57 continues south toward Cocodrie and also straight ahead and to the north across Bayou Dulac toward Houma.

LA 3011 was created with the 1955 Louisiana Highway renumbering, and its route has remained the same to the present day.

The entire highway is in Dulac, Terrebonne Parish.

mi	km	Destinations	Notes
0.0	0.0	PR 63 (Grand Caillou Road)	Southern terminus
1.5	2.4	LA 57 (Bayou Sale Road) – Houma, Cocodrie	Northern terminus
1.000 mi = 1.609 km; 1.000 km = 0.621 mi

== Louisiana Highway 3012 ==
Louisiana Highway 3012
- Location: Ruston
- Length: 1.46 mi (2.35 km)

Louisiana Highway 3012 (LA 3012) runs 1.46 miles (2.35 km) in Ruston. It was originally a spur route of LA 818

== Louisiana Highway 3014 ==
Louisiana Highway 3014
- Location: Cotton Valley
- Length: 0.57 mi (920 m)
- Existed: 1955–present

Louisiana Highway 3014 (LA 3014) runs 0.57 miles (0.92 km) in a southwest to northeast direction from US 371 to LA 160 in Cotton Valley, Webster Parish.

The route heads northeast from US 371 along Humble Avenue. It then turns north onto Church Street, east onto Resident Street, and finally north onto Main Street to its terminus at LA 160.

LA 3014 is an undivided two-lane highway for its entire length.

The entire highway is in Cotton Valley, Webster Parish.

mi	km	Destinations	Notes
0.00	0.00	US 371	Western terminus
0.57	0.92	LA 160	Eastern terminus
1.000 mi = 1.609 km; 1.000 km = 0.621 mi

== Louisiana Highway 3015 ==
Louisiana Highway 3015
- Location: Longstreet–Grand Cane
- Length: 18.90 mi (30.42 km)

Louisiana Highway 3015 (LA 3015) runs 18.90 miles (30.42 km) from Longstreet to Grand Cane.

== Louisiana Highway 3017 ==
Louisiana Highway 3017
- Location: Belle Chasse–Harvey
- Length: 9.10 mi (14.65 km)
- Existed: 1955–present

Louisiana Highway 3017 (LA 3017) runs 9.10 miles (14.65 km) in a general northwest to southeast direction from LA 18 in Harvey to LA 23 in Belle Chasse.

LA 3017 serves the industrial corridor situated along two sections of the Gulf Intracoastal Waterway and connects it with two major highways in the area, US 90 Bus. and LA 23. The route heads southeast on Peters Road from LA 18 (4th Street) and parallels the portion of the waterway that follows the Harvey Canal. Within a short distance, it intersects the ramps leading to US 90 Bus. (Westbank Expressway). Later, the route crosses Lapalco Boulevard, a main area thoroughfare, and passes Boomtown Casino. Shortly afterward, LA 3017 crosses Bayou Barataria from Jefferson Parish into Plaquemines Parish and turns northeast onto Engineers Road. It proceeds until reaching its junction with LA 23 in Belle Chasse.

Parish	Location	mi	km	Destinations	Notes
Jefferson	Harvey	0.0	0.0	LA 18 (4th Street)	Northeastern terminus
Jefferson	Harvey	3.9	6.3	US 90 Bus. (West Bank Expressway) / I-910	US 90 Bus. passes overhead via Harvey Canal bridge and underneath via Harvey Tunnel; access from LA 3017 via frontage roads; exit 6B on US 90 Bus.
Plaquemines	Belle Chasse	9.1	14.6	LA 23 (Belle Chasse Highway)	Southeastern terminus
1.000 mi = 1.609 km; 1.000 km = 0.621 mi

== Louisiana Highway 3018 ==
Louisiana Highway 3018
- Location: Harvey
- Length: 0.73 mi (1,170 m)
- Existed: 1955–present

Louisiana Highway 3018 (LA 3018) runs 0.73 miles (1.17 km) along Destrehan Avenue in Harvey, Jefferson Parish.

The route begins at an intersection with the US 90 Business (Westbank Expressway) service roads below the high-level Harvey Canal bridge and heads north, running west of and parallel to the canal, to LA 18 (4th Street). LA 3018 serves the La DOTD Harvey Tunnel Maintenance Yard and is an undivided, two-lane highway for its entire length.

In the pre-1955 state highway system, LA 3018 was designated as State Route C-2052. LA 3018 was created with the 1955 Louisiana Highway renumbering, and until the 2000s, its route extended 1.0 mile (1.6 km) further south on Destrehan Avenue to Patriot Street.

The entire highway is in Harvey, Jefferson Parish.

mi	km	Destinations	Notes
0.0	0.0	US 90 Bus. (West Bank Expressway)	Southern terminus; indirect access to US 90 Bus. via service roads
0.7	1.1	LA 18 (4th Street)	Northern terminus
1.000 mi = 1.609 km; 1.000 km = 0.621 mi: Incomplete access

== Louisiana Highway 3019 ==
Louisiana Highway 3019
- Location: New Orleans
- Length: 0.48 mi (770 m)
- Existed: 1955–present

Louisiana Highway 3019 (LA 3019) runs 0.53 miles (0.85 km) in an east–west direction primarily along Veterans Highway in New Orleans (Orleans Parish).

The route begins on the east side of the 17th Street Canal bridge at the Jefferson–Orleans parish line and proceeds east along Veterans Highway, the continuation of Veterans Memorial Boulevard in New Orleans. Eastbound traffic turns south onto Pontchartrain Boulevard and immediately enters an interchange with I-10 and I-610. Westbound traffic utilizes parallel West End Boulevard. LA 3019 is a divided, six-lane highway on Veterans Highway and a divided, four-lane highway on Pontchartrain and West End Boulevards.

LA 3019 is a vestige of the original plans for the Pontchartrain Expressway and its connection to Veterans Highway, which at the time ended just west of the parish line in Metairie. In the pre-1955 state highway system, the planned Pontchartrain Expressway, Greater New Orleans Bridge (now known as the Crescent City Connection), and Westbank Expressway were given the collective designation of State Route C-2200. This became LA 3019 with the 1955 Louisiana Highway renumbering, and the majority of the route was later incorporated into I-10 and US 90 Business. The remaining segment connecting Veterans Memorial Boulevard in Metairie with the I-10/I-610 interchange retains the LA 3019 designation.

Parish	Location	mi	km	Destinations	Notes
Jefferson–Orleans parish line	Metairie–New Orleans line	0.0	0.0	Begin state maintenance on east side of 17th Street Canal bridge	Western terminus
Orleans	New Orleans	0.5	0.80	I-610 east – Slidell; I-10 – Baton Rouge, New Orleans Business District	Eastern terminus; exit 1B on I-610 (no westbound exit); exit 231B on I-10 (eastbound exit is via I-610)
1.000 mi = 1.609 km; 1.000 km = 0.621 mi: Incomplete access

== Louisiana Highway 3020 ==
Louisiana Highway 3020
- Location: Lake Charles
- Length: 3.18 mi (5.12 km)

Louisiana Highway 3020 (LA 3020) runs 3.18 miles (5.12 km) in Lake Charles.

== Louisiana Highway 3021 ==
Louisiana Highway 3021
- Location: New Orleans
- Length: 1.84 mi (2.96 km)
- Existed: 1955–present

Louisiana Highway 3021 (LA 3021) runs 1.84 miles (2.96 km) in a north–south direction along Elysian Fields Avenue in New Orleans (Orleans Parish).

The route begins at North Claiborne Avenue, a junction with LA 39 and LA 46, and proceeds north along Elysian Fields Avenue. LA 3021 engages in interchanges with both I-10 and I-610, passing over the Norfolk Southern Railway (NS) tracks in between, before ending at US 90 (Gentilly Boulevard). It is a six-lane, divided highway for its entire length.

LA 3021 is a vestige of the original plans for the Eastern Expressway, incorporated into the route for I-10 by the time of its construction in the 1960s, which would have connected Eastern New Orleans with North Claiborne Avenue via an expressway in the median of Elysian Fields Avenue. In the pre-1955 state highway system, the proposed route was given the temporary designation of State Route C-2200, changed to LA 3021 in the 1955 Louisiana Highway renumbering. The Elysian Fields Avenue segment, as well as a segment of Morrison Road that is now LA 1253, were ultimately left out of the expressway plans. Though never connected, both retained the LA 3021 designation until the latter segment was given its own number in 2002.

The entire highway is in New Orleans, Orleans Parish.

mi	km	Destinations	Notes
0.0	0.0	LA 39 (North Claiborne Avenue) / LA 46 east (Elysian Fields Avenue)	Southern terminus; western terminus of LA 46
0.5	0.80	I-10 – Baton Rouge, Slidell	Exit 237 on I-10
1.2	1.9	I-610 – Baton Rouge, Slidell	Exit 3 on I-610
1.8	2.9	US 90 (Gentilly Boulevard)	Northern terminus
1.000 mi = 1.609 km; 1.000 km = 0.621 mi

== Louisiana Highway 3024 ==
Louisiana Highway 3024
- Location: Maryland
- Length: 3.19 mi (5.13 km)

Louisiana Highway 3024 (LA 3024) runs 3.19 miles (5.13 km) in Maryland.

== Louisiana Highway 3025 ==
Louisiana Highway 3025
- Location: Lafayette
- Length: 3.77 mi (6.07 km)

Louisiana Highway 3025 (LA 3025) runs 3.77 miles (6.07 km) in Lafayette.

== Louisiana Highway 3032 ==
Louisiana Highway 3032
- Location: Shreveport–Bossier City
- Length: 2.32 mi (3.73 km)

Louisiana Highway 3032 (LA 3032) runs 2.32 miles (3.73 km) from LA 1 (Youree Drive) in Shreveport to US 71 (Barksdale Drive) in Bossier City at the main gate to Barksdale Air Force Base. In Shreveport, the highway is known as East Kings Highway for its first 0.3 miles (0.48 km) before becoming the Shreveport-Barksdale Highway at the Zeke Drive intersection. In Bossier City, the highway is known as Westgate Drive. Despite being a surface street, most of LA 3032 features a pair of two-way service roads.

Parish	Location	mi	km	Destinations	Notes
Caddo	Shreveport	0.0	0.0	LA 1 (Youree Drive) / East Kings Highway	Western terminus; road continues past LA 1 as East Kings Highway
Caddo	Shreveport	1.4	2.3	Clyde Fant Parkway	Interchange
Caddo–Bossier parish line	Shreveport–Bossier City line			Bridge over Red River	
Bossier	Bossier City	2.0	3.2	A. R. Teague Parkway	Interchange
Bossier	Bossier City	2.3	3.7	US 71 (Barksdale Boulevard)	Eastern terminus
1.000 mi = 1.609 km; 1.000 km = 0.621 mi

== Louisiana Highway 3033 ==
Louisiana Highway 3033
- Location: Lapine–Brownsville
- Length: 7.08 mi (11.39 km)

Louisiana Highway 3033 (LA 3033) runs 7.08 miles (11.39 km) from Lapine to Brownsville.

== Louisiana Highway 3034 ==
Louisiana Highway 3034
- Location: Central
- Length: 3.53 mi (5.68 km)
- Existed: 1955–present

Louisiana Highway 3034 (LA 3034) runs 3.53 miles (5.68 km) in an east–west direction from LA 408 to the junction of LA 37 and LA 64 in Central, East Baton Rouge Parish.

The route heads southeast from LA 408 (Hooper Road) along Sullivan Road. It then turns east onto Wax Road, which transitions onto Magnolia Bridge Road. The route ends at an intersection with LA 37/LA 64 (Greenwell Springs Road) just west of the Amite River.

LA 3034 is an undivided two-lane highway for its entire length.

The entire highway is in Central, East Baton Rouge Parish.

mi	km	Destinations	Notes
0.00	0.00	LA 408 (Hooper Road)	Western terminus
3.53	5.68	LA 37 / LA 64 (Greenwell Springs Road, Magnolia Bridge Road)	Eastern terminus
1.000 mi = 1.609 km; 1.000 km = 0.621 mi

== Louisiana Highway 3036 ==
Louisiana Highway 3036
- Location: Shreveport
- Length: 1.19 mi (1.92 km)

Louisiana Highway 3036 (LA 3036) runs 1.19 miles (1.92 km) in Shreveport.

== Louisiana Highway 3037 ==
Louisiana Highway 3037
- Location: Jonesville
- Length: 2.30 mi (3.70 km)

Louisiana Highway 3037 (LA 3037) runs 2.30 miles (3.70 km) in Jonesville.

== Louisiana Highway 3038 ==
Louisiana Highway 3038
- Location: Gonzales
- Length: 0.64 mi (1,030 m)

Louisiana Highway 3038 (LA 3038) runs 0.64 miles (1.03 km) in Gonzales.

== Louisiana Highway 3039 ==
Louisiana Highway 3039
- Location: Parks–Patin
- Length: 6.49 mi (10.44 km)

Louisiana Highway 3039 (LA 3039) runs 6.49 miles (10.44 km) from Parks to Patin.

== Louisiana Highway 3040 ==
Louisiana Highway 3040
- Location: Houma
- Length: 6.27 mi (10.09 km)
- Existed: 1955–present

Louisiana Highway 3040 (LA 3040) runs 6.27 miles (10.09 km) in a northwest to southeast direction from LA 24 in Bayou Cane to LA 661 in Houma. The route formerly had a spur that traveled 0.20 miles (0.32 km) along South Hollywood Road to a junction with LA 24 in Houma.

LA 3040 travels southeast from LA 24 in Bayou Cane and runs parallel to that route into the Houma city limits, where it becomes known as Martin Luther King Boulevard. Crossing South Hollywood Road, the local name changes to West Tunnel Boulevard. The route then curves eastward and divides onto the one-way pair of Honduras and Bond Streets as it passes just south of the downtown area. After about a dozen blocks, the travel lanes of LA 3040 converge, and the roadway passes through a tunnel underneath the Gulf Intracoastal Waterway. On the other side, LA 3040 continues as East Tunnel Boulevard and turns northeast across LA 57 (Grand Caillou Road) to its terminus at LA 661 (Howard Avenue).

The entire highway is in Terrebonne Parish.

Location	mi	km	Destinations	Notes
Bayou Cane	0.0	0.0	LA 24 (Main Street, Park Avenue) – Thibodaux, Houma	Western terminus
Bayou Cane–Houma line	3.4	5.5	LA 664 (St. Charles Street)	
Houma	4.4	7.1	LA 312 (Lafayette Street)	
Houma	4.7	7.6	LA 182 (Barrow Street) – New Orleans, Morgan City	
Houma	5.1	8.2	Houma Tunnel under Gulf Intracoastal Waterway	
Houma	5.8	9.3	LA 57 (Grand Caillou Road) – Dulac, Cocodrie	
Houma	6.3	10.1	LA 661 (Howard Avenue)	Eastern terminus
1.000 mi = 1.609 km; 1.000 km = 0.621 mi

== Louisiana Highway 3041 ==
Louisiana Highway 3041
- Location: Avoyelles Parish
- Length: 1.34 mi (2.16 km)

Louisiana Highway 3041 (LA 3041) runs 1.34 miles (2.16 km) in Avoyelles Parish.

== Louisiana Highway 3042 ==
Louisiana Highway 3042
- Location: Ville Platte–St. Landry
- Length: 11.13 mi (17.91 km)

Louisiana Highway 3042 (LA 3042) runs 11.13 miles (17.91 km) from Ville Platte to St. Landry.

== Louisiana Highway 3043 ==
Louisiana Highway 3043
- Location: Prairie Ronde–Opelousas
- Length: 6.88 mi (11.07 km)

Louisiana Highway 3043 (LA 3043) runs 6.88 miles (11.07 km) from Prairie Ronde to Opelousas.

== Louisiana Highway 3044 ==
Louisiana Highway 3044
- Location: Tensas Parish
- Length: 2.47 mi (3.98 km)

Louisiana Highway 3044 (LA 3044) runs 2.47 miles (3.98 km) in Tensas Parish.

== Louisiana Highway 3045 ==
Louisiana Highway 3045
- Location: Baton Rouge
- Length: 0.49 mi (790 m)

Louisiana Highway 3045 (LA 3045) runs 0.49 miles (0.79 km) in Baton Rouge.

== Louisiana Highway 3046 ==
Louisiana Highway 3046
- Location: Jefferson–Metairie
- Length: 0.96 mi (1,540 m)
- Existed: 1955–present

Louisiana Highway 3046 (LA 3046) is a state highway in Louisiana that serves Jefferson Parish. It spans 1.0 mile (1.6 km) in a south to north direction. It is known locally as Causeway Boulevard.

== Louisiana Highway 3048 ==
Louisiana Highway 3048
- Location: Rayville
- Length: 6.45 mi (10.38 km)

Louisiana Highway 3048 (LA 3048) runs 6.45 miles (10.38 km) in Rayville.

== Louisiana Highway 3049 ==
Louisiana Highway 3049
- Location: Shreveport–Gilliam
- Length: 22.76 mi (36.63 km)
- Existed: 1955–present

Louisiana Highway 3049 (LA 3049) runs 22.76 miles (36.63 km) in a north–south direction from the concurrent US 71/LA 1 in Shreveport to a second junction with US 71 in Gilliam, Caddo Parish.

The entire highway is in Caddo Parish.

Location	mi	km	Destinations	Notes
Shreveport	0.0	0.0	US 71 / LA 1 (Market Street)	Southern terminus
Shreveport	1.7	2.7	LA 538 north (Old Mooringsport Road)	Southern terminus of LA 538
Dixie	12.6	20.3	LA 173 south (Dixie Blanchard Road)	Northern terminus of LA 173
Belcher	17.4	28.0	LA 530 west (Caddo Street)	Eastern terminus of LA 530
Gilliam	22.8	36.7	US 71 / LA 170 west – Vivian	Eastern terminus of LA 170
1.000 mi = 1.609 km; 1.000 km = 0.621 mi
