= Pointe-aux-Chenes Wildlife Management Area =

Protected area in Louisiana, United States

- Pointe-aux-Chenes WMA
- IUCN category V (protected landscape/seascape)
- Location within Louisiana
- Location: Terrebonne and Lafourche parishes
- Coordinates: 29°25′0″N 90°27′0″W
- Area: 33,488 acres (135.52 km^{2})
- Governing body: Louisiana Department of Wildlife and Fisheries

Pointe-aux-Chenes WMA

Pointe-aux-Chenes Wildlife Management Area, also referred to as the Pointe-aux-Chenes WMA (French: Pointe Au Chien), is a 33,488 acres (13,552 ha) protected area located in Terrebonne and Lafourche Parish, Louisiana, that is owned and managed by the Louisiana Department of Wildlife and Fisheries (LDWF).

== Location ==
The WMA is located approximately 15 miles southeast of Houma, east of Montegut and LA 55, west of Galliano and Golden Meadow on LA 1. The WMA is separated into two sections by LA 665 and Bayou Pointe Au Chien, that runs northwest to southeast, along with the parish boundaries.

== Description ==
Pointe-aux-Chenes WMA consists of three units, Grand Bayou, Pointe-aux-Chenes and Montegut. The WMA is mostly intermediate to brackish marsh and mainly accessible by boat on the many ponds, bayous, and canals but with ample highway access. Game species include waterfowl, deer, rabbit, squirrel, rails, gallinules, and snipe. Inland saltwater fish species, crabs, and shrimp are also present as well as freshwater fish in the northern parts. The WMA participates in the Louisiana dove hunting program

4,689 acres (1,898 ha) was proposed as a limited access area in 2010 and by the 2012-2013 season the Montegut Unit and the upper quarter of the Pointe-aux-Chenes Unit, both on the east side of LA 665, have been designated as limited access, meaning paddlecraft only.

== Restoration ==
Restore the Earth Foundation (REF) and a National Fish and Wildlife Foundation grant allowed 35 Shell employees to plant a second round of 600 bald cypress saplings between protective levees on the WMA access road. The first round involved planting 500 saplings, that are reported as thriving, as part of a goal of restoring one million acres of degraded lands and critical wetlands, in the lower Mississippi River Delta.

== See also ==
- List of Louisiana Wildlife Management Areas
