= Bayou Barbary, Louisiana =

Unincorporated community in Louisiana

- Unincorporated community
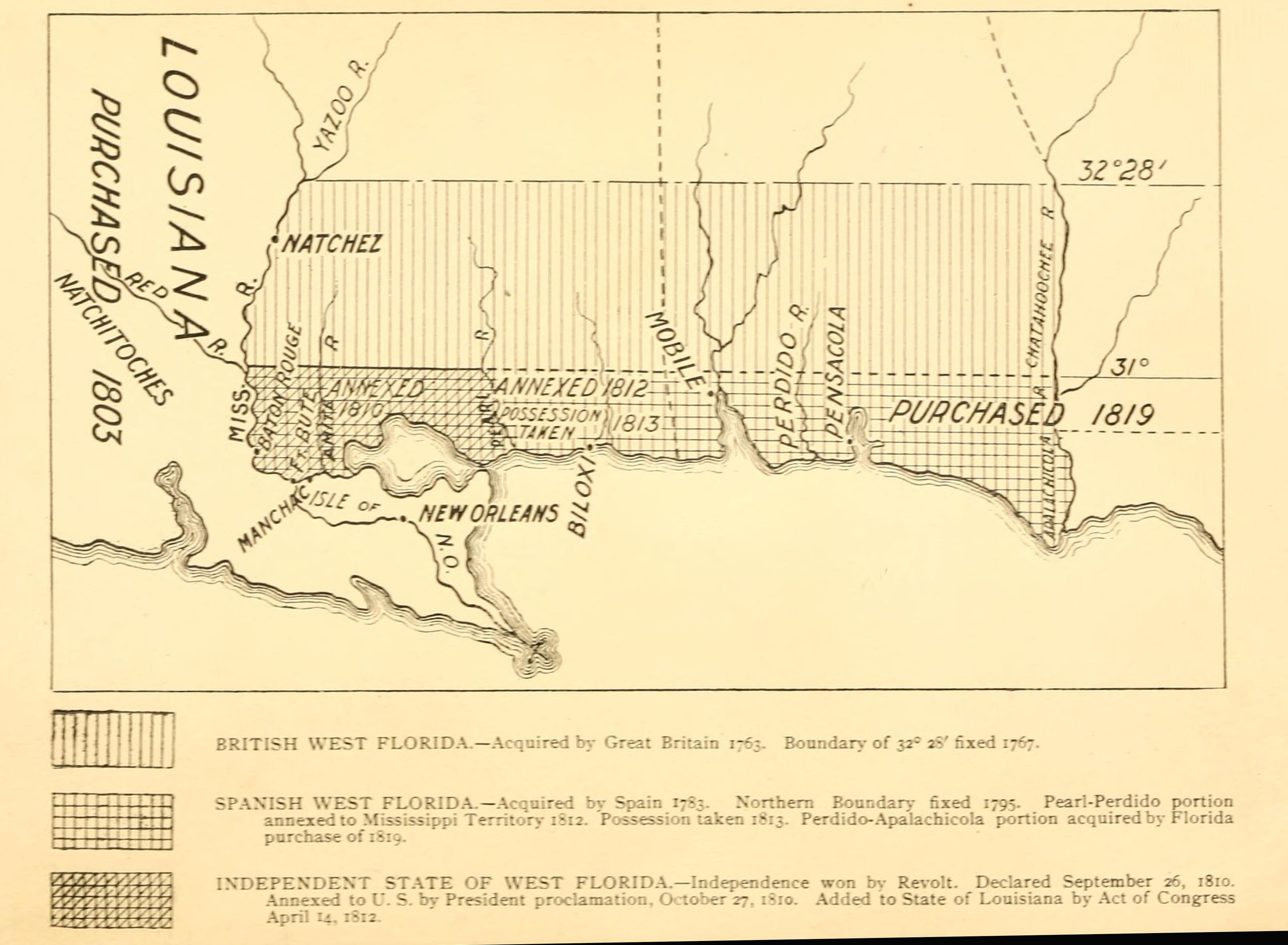
- A map published in 1898 showing Bayou Barbary was part of an independent state.

- Location within Louisiana Location within the United States
- Coordinates: 30°20′28″N 90°40′25″W
- Country: United States
- State: Louisiana
- Parish: Livingston
- Elevation: 10 ft (3.0 m)
- Time zone: UTC-6 (Central (CST))
  - Summer (DST): UTC-5 (CDT)
- ZIP code: 70462
- Area code: 225
- GNIS feature ID: 551981
- FIPS code: 22-05140

Bayou Barbary is an unincorporated community in Livingston Parish, Louisiana, United States. The community is located on Louisiana Highway 444 5 mi (8.0 km) west of Killian, 3.5 mi (5.6 km) east of Verdun and 1 mi (1.6 km) north of the Amite River.

== Early settlers ==
The earliest documented settlers in Bayou Barbary were Joseph Thomas and three brothers from the Denham family. The area of Bayou Barbary was excluded from the Louisiana Purchase and left these early settlers behind as subjects of West Florida and the Spanish Empire. A local man named Philemon Thomas organized the revolt and Joseph Thomas led the militia to assist with the capture of Fort San Carlos which was under Spanish control. Early in the morning on September 23, 1810, the rebels stormed the fort killing several Spanish soldiers. It was a quick battle but the rebels succeeded and for a period of 74 days established the Republic of West Florida.

== Notable people ==
- Laine Hardy, American Idol contestant 2018; American Idol winner 2019
