= Bourg, Louisiana =

Bourg
- Census-designated places
- Location of Bourg in Louisiana
- Coordinates: 29°33′13″N 90°36′08″W
- Country: United States
- State: Louisiana
- Parish: Terrebonne

Area
  - Total: 5.74 sq mi (14.87 km^{2})
  - Land: 5.64 sq mi (14.62 km^{2})
  - Water: 0.093 sq mi (0.24 km^{2})
- Elevation: 7 ft (2.1 m)

Population (2020)
  - Total: 2,375
  - Density: 420.7/sq mi (162.43/km^{2})
- Time zone: UTC-6 (CST)
  - Summer (DST): UTC-5 (CDT)
- ZIP code: 70343
- Area code: 985
- FIPS code: 22-09095

Bourg is a census-designated place in Terrebonne Parish, Louisiana, United States. As of the 2020 census, Bourg had a population of 2,375. It is part of the Houma–Bayou Cane–Thibodaux Metropolitan Statistical Area.

== Demographics ==
Historical population
Census	Pop.	Note	%±
2010	2,579		—
2020	2,375		−7.9%
U.S. Decennial Census

Bourg first appeared as a census designated place in the 2010 U.S. census. '

== Government and infrastructure ==
The United States Postal Service operates the Bourg Post Office within the Presquille CDP.

== Education ==
Terrebonne Parish School District operates public schools in the entire parish. Schools with Bourg addresses include Bourg Elementary School (PK-4) and South Terrebonne High School (9–12).

Terrebonne Parish Library System formerly operated the Bourg Branch. Due to damage from Hurricane Ida, the library permanently closed. Another library was to be built in an area near Bourg.

The initial location of the non-district public school École Pointe-au-Chien was to be in the Vision Christian Center in Bourg.

== WMA ==
Access to the Pointe-aux-Chenes Wildlife Management Area (WMA) can be made through Bourg, LA 24, and down LA 55 or LA 665.
