= Louisiana Highway 55 =

State highway in Louisiana, United States

Louisiana Highway 55
- Montegut Road

Route information
- Maintained by Louisiana DOTD
- Length: 14.09 mi (22.68 km)
- Existed: 1955 renumbering–present

Major junctions
- South end: Dead end south of Montegut
- North end: LA 24 in Klondyke

Location
- Country: United States
- State: Louisiana
- Parishes: Terrebonne

Highway system
- Louisiana State Highway System; Interstate; US; State; Scenic
← I-55	→ LA 56
← SR 80	LA 81	→ SR 82

Louisiana Highway 55 (LA 55) is a state highway located in Terrebonne Parish, Louisiana. It runs 14.09 miles (22.68 km) in a north–south direction from a dead end south of Montegut to a junction with LA 24 in Klondyke.

The route travels alongside Bayou Terrebonne, connecting Montegut with the community of Bourg, which is located just beyond Klondyke. LA 24 continues the route into Houma, the parish seat and nearest city. It also connects LA 55 to LA 1 at Larose, located on Bayou Lafourche. LA 55 is known locally as Montegut Road.

== Route description ==
From the south, LA 55 begins at a dead end on the east bank of Bayou Terrebonne at a point 5.6 miles (9.0 km) south of Montegut. It heads northward along the bayou on a narrow strip of land within the marshes of lower Terrebonne Parish, passing a series of elevated boat houses. After 4.8 miles (7.7 km), LA 55 passes through Point Barre as more traditional residences begin to line the roadway. Soon afterward, LA 55 crosses a vertical lift bridge over the Humble Canal and enters the community of Montegut.

2.2 miles (3.5 km) later, the area transitions to a closely built residential neighborhood. LA 55 continues northward through town and intersects LA 58 (Sarah Road), which heads west across Bayou Terrebonne and connects to LA 56 north of Chauvin. At the northern limit of Montegut is an area known as Pointe-Aux-Chenes. Here, LA 55 intersects LA 665, which heads to the southeast along Bayou Pointe-Aux-Chenes.

The highway then bends to the northwest with Bayou Terrebonne and continues for a final 4.2 miles (6.8 km) to an area known as Klondyke, just southeast of Bourg. The route ends at an intersection with LA 24, which continues northwest along the bayou toward Houma and east to Larose via the Bourg-Larose Highway. On the southwest, a locally maintained vertical lift bridge connects to Klondyke Road on the opposite side of the bayou.

LA 55 is classified by the Louisiana Department of Transportation and Development (La DOTD) as a rural minor collector south of Montegut, an urban collector in Montegut north to LA 58, and an urban minor arterial from LA 58 to the northern terminus. Average daily traffic volume in 2013 is reported as 340 vehicles at the southern end, increasing to 4,000 as the highway reaches the populated portion of Montegut, and increasing again to 5,100 north of LA 58. The posted speed limit is generally 55 mph (90 km/h), briefly reduced to 25 mph (40 km/h) through the center of Montegut. LA 55 is an undivided, two-lane highway for its entire length.

== History ==
=== Pre-1955 route numbering ===
In the original Louisiana Highway system in use between 1921 and 1955, the modern LA 55 was part of two separate state highways, State Route 81 and State Route 69.

State Route 81
- Location: Terrebonne Parish
- Length: 7.1 mi (11.4 km)
- Existed: 1921–1955

State Route 81 followed the current route of LA 55 from the southern terminus through the community of Montegut. Route 81 was designated in 1921 by an act of the state legislature, which defined the first 98 routes of the original state highway system.

Route 81. From Montegut to Sea Breeze.

— 1921 legislative route description

The highway was originally projected to extend further south to a point on Bayou Terrebonne near Bay La Fleur off Lake Barre. However, it was never constructed south of the Madison Canal at this time, and the route remained the same up to the 1955 Louisiana Highway renumbering.

State Route 69 picked up the route of the modern LA 55 from Montegut to the northern terminus at Klondyke. Like Route 81, it was created in 1921 as one of the original 98 state highways. After reaching Klondyke, Route 69 continued along the present LA 24 corridor through Houma to Schriever. It then continued along the present LA 20 corridor to Thibodaux in neighboring Lafourche Parish. Route 69 also remained in effect until the 1955 renumbering.

=== Post-1955 route history ===
LA 55 was created with the 1955 renumbering, following the entirety of former State Route 81 as well as the portion of former State Route 69 to Klondyke, just southeast of Bourg.

La 55—From a point at or near Madison Canal through or near Pointe Barre and Montegut to a junction with La 24 at or near Bourg.

— 1955 legislative route description

The route has remained largely the same to the present day, with the exception of a short extension on the southern end. Since its designation, the roadway has been extended across the Madison Canal about 1.6 miles (2.6 km) further south than the original southern terminus.

== Future ==
La DOTD is currently engaged in a program that aims to transfer about 5,000 miles (8,000 km) of state-owned roadways to local governments over the next several years. Under this plan of "right-sizing" the state highway system, the entire portion of LA 55 south of LA 58 is proposed for deletion as it does not meet a significant interurban travel function.

== Major intersections ==
The entire highway is in Terrebonne Parish.

Location	mi	km	Destinations	Notes
	0.0	0.0	Dead end south of Madison Canal	Southern terminus
Montegut	8.8	14.2	LA 58 (Sarah Road) – Chauvin	Eastern terminus of LA 58
Montegut	9.9	15.9	LA 665 (Pointe-Aux-Chenes Road) – Pointe-Aux-Chenes	Western terminus of LA 665
Klondyke	14.1	22.7	LA 24 (Bourg-Larose Highway) – Houma, Larose, Grand Isle	Northern terminus
1.000 mi = 1.609 km; 1.000 km = 0.621 mi
