= Ashland, Terrebonne Parish, Louisiana =

Unincorporated community in Louisiana, U.S.

Coordinates: 29.530°N 90.674°W

Ashland is an unincorporated community in Terrebonne Parish, Louisiana, United States. Its area code is 985 and its ZIP code is 70363. The community's "boundaries" begin just south of the intersection of Thompson and Grand Caillou roads in Houma and end just south of Grand Caillou Elementary at the intersection of Cedar Grove and Grand Caillou roads. The community has two separate residential subdivisions, Ashland North (est. 1989) and Ashland South (est. 1985). It is the site of the Terrebonne Parish Correctional Facility, often referred to as "Big Ashland" by locals, and Ashland Landfill which is located at the end of Ashland Landfill Road behind the prison.
