= Bayou Blue, Louisiana =

- Census-designated place
- Location within Louisiana Location within the United States
- Coordinates: 29°38′03″N 90°40′23″W
- Country: United States
- State: Louisiana
- Parish: Lafourche, Terrebonne

Area
  - Total: 23.53 sq mi (60.94 km^{2})
  - Land: 23.27 sq mi (60.28 km^{2})
  - Water: 0.26 sq mi (0.67 km^{2})
- Elevation: 7 ft (2.1 m)

Population (2020)
  - Total: 13,352
  - Density: 573.7/sq mi (221.51/km^{2})
- Time zone: UTC-6 (Central (CST))
  - Summer (DST): UTC-5 (CDT)
- Area code: 985
- GNIS feature ID: 2583527

Bayou Blue is a metropolitan area in Lafourche and Terrebonne parishes, Louisiana, United States. As of the 2020 census, Bayou Blue had a population of 13,352.

In June 1981, an arson attack on a local nightclub killed five people.

== Geography ==
According to the U.S. Census Bureau, the community has an area of 23.520 square miles (60.92 km^{2}); 23.263 square miles (60.25 km^{2}) of its area is land, and 0.257 square miles (0.67 km^{2}) is water.

== Demographics ==
Historical population
Census	Pop.	Note	%±
2010	12,352		—
2020	13,352		8.1%
U.S. Decennial Census; 1950 1960 1970 1980; 1990 2000 2010

Bayou Blue was first listed as a census designated place in the 2010 U.S. census.

Bayou Blue racial composition as of 2020
Race	Number	Percentage
White (non-Hispanic)	9,625	72.09%
Black or African American (non-Hispanic)	1,087	8.14%
Native American	620	4.64%
Asian	57	0.43%
Pacific Islander	4	0.03%
Other/Mixed	661	4.95%
Hispanic or Latino	1,298	9.72%

As of the 2020 United States census, there were 13,352 people, 3,891 households, and 3,049 families residing in the CDP.

== Education ==
The Lafourche Parish portion is in the Lafourche Parish School District. Schools in the Lafourche Parish part of the CDP include: Bayou Blue Elementary School, and Bayou Blue Middle School.

Areas in Terrebonne Parish are assigned to Terrebonne Parish School District.

Lafourche Parish Library operates the Bayou Blue Library.

Both Lafourche and Terrebonne parishes are in the service area of Fletcher Technical Community College. Additionally, a Delgado Community College document stated that both Lafourche and Terrebonne parishes were in the college's service area.
