= Presquille, Louisiana =

- Unincorporated community
- Location within Louisiana Location within the United States
- Coordinates: 29°33′50″N 90°38′46″W
- Country: United States
- State: Louisiana
- Parish: Terrebonne

Area
  - Total: 0.78 sq mi (2.03 km^{2})
  - Land: 0.78 sq mi (2.03 km^{2})
  - Water: 0 sq mi (0.00 km^{2})
- Elevation: 10 ft (3.0 m)

Population (2020)
  - Total: 1,703
  - Density: 2,175.9/sq mi (840.12/km^{2})
- Time zone: UTC-6 (Central (CST))
  - Summer (DST): UTC-5 (CDT)
- Area code: 985
- GNIS feature ID: 541169

Presquille is an unincorporated community and census-designated place in Terrebonne Parish, Louisiana, United States. As of the 2020 census, Presquille had a population of 1,703. Louisiana Highway 24 passes through the community.

== Geography ==
According to the U.S. Census Bureau, the community has an area of 0.785 square miles (2.03 km^{2}), all land.

== Demographics ==
Historical population
| Census | Pop. | Note | %± |
|---|---|---|---|
| 2010 | 1,807 | | — |
| 2020 | 1,703 | | −5.8% |
U.S. Decennial Census

Presquille first appeared as a census designated place in the 2010 U.S. census. '

== Government and infrastructure ==
The United States Postal Service operates the Bourg Post Office within the Presquille CDP.

== Education ==
It is in the Terrebonne Parish School District.
