= Theriot, Terrebonne Parish, Louisiana =

Theriot, Louisiana
- Unincorporated community
- Location within Louisiana Location within the United States
- Coordinates: 29°27′41″N 90°45′05″W
- Country: United States
- State: Louisiana
- Parish: Terrebonne
- Elevation: 3 ft (0.91 m)
- Time zone: UTC-6 (Central (CST))
  - Summer (DST): UTC-5 (CDT)
- ZIP code: 70397
- Area code: 985
- GNIS feature ID: 556229

Theriot (/ˈtɛrioʊ/; also Bayou du Large) is an unincorporated community in Terrebonne Parish, Louisiana, United States. Its ZIP code is 70397.
