= Terrebonne Parish, Louisiana =

Parish in Louisiana, United States

Terrebonne Parish
- Parish
- Parish of Terrebonne; Paroisse de Terrebonne (French)
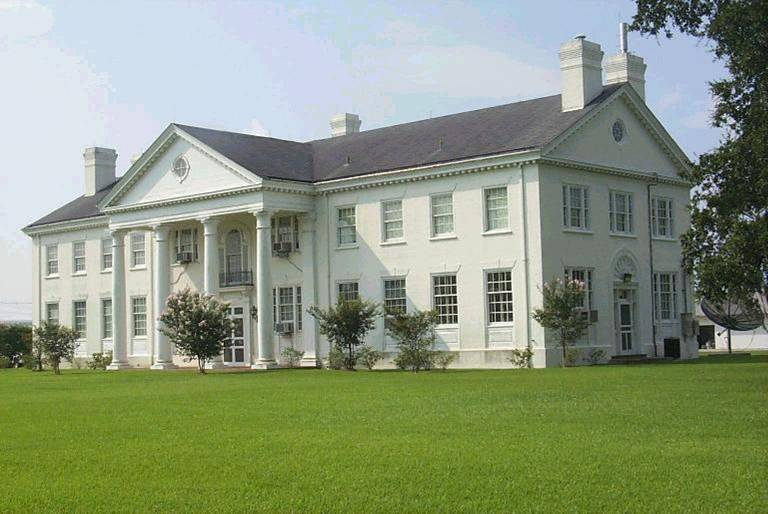
- U.S. Department of Agriculture building in Houma

- Flag Seal Logo

- Location within the U.S. state of Louisiana
- Coordinates: 29°20′N 90°50′W
- Country: United States
- State: Louisiana
- Founded: March 22, 1822
- Named for: terre bonne, French for good earth
- Seat: Houma
- Largest city: Houma

Area
  - Total: 2,080 sq mi (5,400 km^{2})
  - Land: 1,232 sq mi (3,190 km^{2})
  - Water: 850 sq mi (2,200 km^{2}) 41%

Population (2020)
  - Total: 109,580
  - Estimate (2025): 104,163 ▼
  - Density: 88.94/sq mi (34.34/km^{2})
- Time zone: UTC−6 (Central)
  - Summer (DST): UTC−5 (CDT)
- Congressional districts: 1st, 6th
- Website: www.tpcg.org

Terrebonne Parish (/ˌtɛrəˈboʊn/ TERR-ə-BOHN; French: Paroisse de Terrebonne) is a parish located in the southern part of the U.S. state of Louisiana. At the 2020 census, the population was 109,580. The parish seat is Houma. The parish was founded in 1822. Terrebonne Parish is part of the Houma-Thibodaux metropolitan statistical area.

It is the fifth-largest parish in the state in terms of land area, and it has been a center of Cajun culture since the 18th century. More than 10% of its residents speak French at home.

== History ==
The parish seat of Houma was named after the Houma people. The native word houma means red, and the tribe's war emblem was the crawfish. Historians say the Houma are related to the Muskogean-speaking Choctaw, and migrated into the area from present-day Mississippi and Alabama. They first settled in the area that developed as Baton Rouge. After many conflicts with other Indian tribes, and losing a war to the Tunica in 1706, the Houma Indians continued moving south to more remote areas in the bayous, in order to escape the encroachment of Europeans. They settled in present-day Terrebonne Parish in the mid- to late 18th century. They established a camp known as Ouiski Bayou on the high ground northwest of what later developed as downtown Houma. They were subsequently pushed from the highlands of the north to the coastal regions of the south by the European settlements in the late 1700s and 1800s. Evidence of the Houma Tribe can still be found in this area today.

One of the southernmost of Louisiana's parishes, Terrebonne Parish was established on March 22, 1822, from the southern part of Lafourche Interior, bordering on the Gulf of Mexico. Covering an area of 2100 square miles, it is the second-largest parish in the state. The early French settlers named the parish for the fertility of its soils: terre bonne means "good earth."

In 1834, Terrebonne Parish founded the city of Houma in order to establish a centrally located and more easily accessible parish seat. Prior to this, the county seat had been set at Williamsburg (now Bayou Cane), approximately four miles northwest of present-day downtown Houma. Government officials believed that the site of Houma, at the convergence of six bayous, would provide better access for commerce and development in Terrebonne Parish, as most transportation and shipping was by water. It was near a former settlement of the Houma Tribe of Native Americans. Williamsburg was at the junction of two bayous: Cane and Terrebonne.

=== European and African settlers ===
Most of the European settlers who came to Terrebonne migrated from along the Mississippi River, down Bayou Lafourche to Bayou Terrebonne. There was an influx of French colonists from New Orleans to the bayou country in 1762 after the Spanish took over rule of the colony following the French defeat by the British in the Seven Years' War (known as the French and Indian War in North America). The district Spanish commandant granted concessions of title to not more than 630 acres of land for each newcomer to the bayou lands. While many Frenchmen came into the area prior to this, British and Spanish colonists also recorded claims.

Other settlers in the area in 1760 were French colonists from Acadia (modern Nova Scotia), who had been expelled by the British in 1755 during the Seven Years' War. They became known as "Cajuns" (Acadians). Many settled along the bayous in Terrebonne Parish. They chose this area because of its isolated geographic location, a minimum of government control, fertile land, and an abundance of fish and wildlife. These people lived in relative cultural seclusion for generations and continued their family traditions of living off the land. Today they celebrate their heritage through their festivals and church fairs.

In 1848, Houma was incorporated as a city by an act of legislature. By this time, industry in the Houma area consisted largely of plantations for sugar cane, dependent on the labor of enslaved African-Americans. Also important were harvesting seafood, fur trading, and logging industries. The cultivation of sugar cane was the principal agricultural industry in the parish. The first plantation in the parish was established in 1828. By 1851, Terrebonne had 110 plantations with 80 sugar houses (small sugar cane mills). Thousands of enslaved Africans were brought to the parish through the Trans-Atlantic slave trade.(no citation)

Southdown Plantation was founded in 1828 by the Minor family. They held hundreds of enslaved Africans for sugar cane cultivation and processing. Stephen Minor had served as the Secretary to the Spanish Governor Gayoso of Louisiana. Today, the Minor family home, built in 1858 and enlarged in 1893, serves as the parish museum. The sugar mill was sold in 1979, dismantled and shipped to Guatemala, where it was reassembled. It is still in use today.

Settlers had canals dug between the bayous to decrease travel time within the parish and make trade more efficient. In 1872, a railroad that linked Schriever to Houma was instrumental in increasing trade and travel within and outside the parish.

In 1923, the construction of the Intracoastal Waterway led to the abandonment of the canals. The Intracoastal was later extended to Lafourche Parish and to Bayou Lafourche, increasing Houma's importance as a portal city.

=== 20th century to present ===
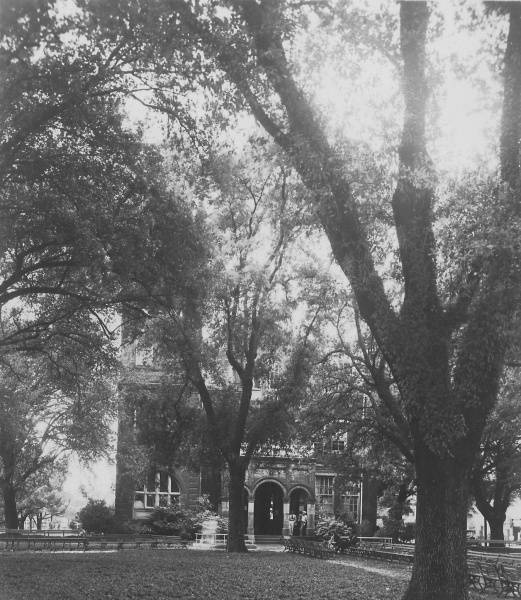
Terrebonne Parish Courthouse in Houma, circa 1938.

During World War II, Houma was selected for the establishment of a Lighter Than Air Blimp Naval Station, which operated from May 1943 to September 1944. The Navy base, which used blimp squadrons to scan the coastline for enemy vessels, was one of only two blimp stations operating on the Gulf Coast.

Terrebonne has depended on natural resources: oysters, shrimp, crabs and fish contribute their share of wealth to the parish. In the great stretches of marshland surrounding Terrebonne parish, trapping of Louisiana muskrat, mink, otter, raccoon, and nutria pelts are another form of local commerce.

Development of oil and gas resources in the parish began in 1929, bringing a period of economic development and prosperity unparalleled anywhere in the state. The industry grew into enormous dimensions with the discovery of offshore oil. Terrebonne became the gateway to the most dense concentration of offshore oil service companies in the state. By 1960, with the combination of rich oil production backed by Houma's productive waters, fertile soil, and natural mineral resources, Houma became one of the fastest-growing cities in America. In 1961, the Houma Navigational Canal was completed to provide a 30-mile link to Terrebonne Bay and the Gulf of Mexico.

By the late 1970s, Houma's main focus was the oil industry. Those companies not related to oil and gas depended on this industry for their survival. When the bottom fell out of the oil industry in the early 1980s because of cheaper foreign product and dwindling local resources, Houma declined. For nearly two years, the Houma-Terrebonne area experienced an unemployment rate near 25%.

The Houma community has worked to diversify the parish economy. While the oil industry is still the primary source of revenue for the Houma-Terrebonne area, alternative industries are emerging. Terrebonne Parish accounts for more than 20% of Louisiana's seafood production. In addition, the medical industry is growing in the area. Tourism, too, is a popular source of commerce in and around Houma. The addition of Houma's new Civic Center promises to attract more entertainment and convention revenue to the city.

On August 29, 2021, Hurricane Ida caused major damage within the parish.

On September 11, 2024, Hurricane Francine made landfall in the parish.

== Geography ==
According to the U.S. Census Bureau, the parish has a total area of 2,082 square miles (5,390 km^{2}), of which 1,232 square miles (3,190 km^{2}) is land and 850 square miles (2,200 km^{2}) (41%) is water. It is the fifth-largest parish in Louisiana by land area and third-largest by total area. The Gulf of Mexico is located to the south of the parish.

The average height above sea level of the parish is about six feet. The parish is protected by extensive flood protection works.

=== Major highways ===
- Future Interstate 49
- U.S. Highway 90
- Louisiana Highway 20
- Louisiana Highway 24
- Louisiana Highway 55
- Louisiana Highway 56
- Louisiana Highway 57
- Louisiana Highway 58
- Louisiana Highway 182
- Louisiana Highway 309
- Louisiana Highway 311
- Louisiana Highway 312
- Louisiana Highway 315
- Louisiana Highway 316
- Louisiana Highway 648
- Louisiana Highway 659
- Louisiana Highway 660
- Louisiana Highway 661
- Louisiana Highway 662
- Louisiana Highway 664
- Louisiana Highway 665
- Louisiana Highway 3011
- Louisiana Highway 3040
- Louisiana Highway 3087
- Louisiana Highway 3185
- Louisiana Highway 3197

=== Adjacent parishes ===
- Assumption Parish (north)
- Lafourche Parish (east)
- St. Mary Parish (northwest)

=== National protected area ===
- Mandalay National Wildlife Refuge

== Communities ==
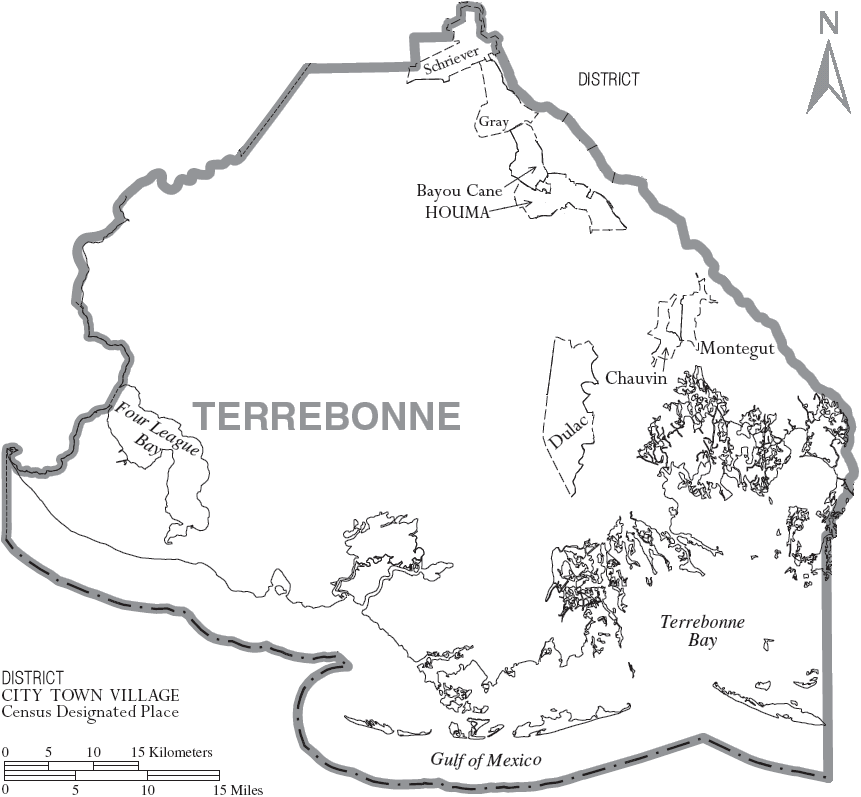
Map of Terrebonne Parish, with municipal labels

=== City ===
- Houma (parish seat)

=== Unincorporated areas ===
==== Census-designated places ====
- Bayou Blue
- Bayou Cane
- Bourg
- Chauvin
- Dulac
- Gray
- Montegut
- Presquille
- Schriever

==== Other unincorporated communities ====
- Ashland
- Chacahoula
- Cocodrie
- Gibson
- Isle de Jean Charles
- Pointe-aux-Chenes
- Theriot

== Demographics ==
Historical population
| Census | Pop. | Note | %± |
|---|---|---|---|
| 1830 | 2,121 | | — |
| 1840 | 4,410 | | 107.9% |
| 1850 | 7,724 | | 75.1% |
| 1860 | 12,091 | | 56.5% |
| 1870 | 12,451 | | 3.0% |
| 1880 | 17,957 | | 44.2% |
| 1890 | 20,167 | | 12.3% |
| 1900 | 24,464 | | 21.3% |
| 1910 | 28,320 | | 15.8% |
| 1920 | 26,974 | | −4.8% |
| 1930 | 29,816 | | 10.5% |
| 1940 | 35,880 | | 20.3% |
| 1950 | 43,328 | | 20.8% |
| 1960 | 60,771 | | 40.3% |
| 1970 | 76,049 | | 25.1% |
| 1980 | 94,393 | | 24.1% |
| 1990 | 96,982 | | 2.7% |
| 2000 | 104,503 | | 7.8% |
| 2010 | 111,860 | | 7.0% |
| 2020 | 109,580 | | −2.0% |
| 2025 (est.) | 104,163 | ▼ | −4.9% |
U.S. Decennial Census; 1790-1960 1900-1990; 1990-2000 2010

Terrebonne Parish, Louisiana – Racial and ethnic composition Note: the US Census treats Hispanic/Latino as an ethnic category. This table excludes Latinos from the racial categories and assigns them to a separate category. Hispanics/Latinos may be of any race.
| Race / Ethnicity (NH = Non-Hispanic) | Pop 1980 | Pop 1990 | Pop 2000 | Pop 2010 | Pop 2020 | % 1980 | % 1990 | % 2000 | % 2010 | % 2020 |
|---|---|---|---|---|---|---|---|---|---|---|
| White alone (NH) | 74,811 | 74,152 | 76,548 | 76,789 | 68,802 | 79.25% | 76.46% | 73.25% | 68.65% | 62.79% |
| Black or African American alone (NH) | 14,483 | 15,940 | 18,517 | 21,046 | 21,059 | 15.34% | 16.44% | 17.72% | 18.81% | 19.22% |
| Native American or Alaska Native alone (NH) | 3,274 | 4,809 | 5,460 | 6,226 | 5,808 | 3.47% | 4.96% | 5.22% | 5.57% | 5.30% |
| Asian alone (NH) | 219 | 669 | 836 | 1,127 | 1,294 | 0.23% | 0.69% | 0.80% | 1.01% | 1.18% |
| Native Hawaiian or Pacific Islander alone (NH) | x | x | 14 | 40 | 39 | x | x | 0.01% | 0.04% | 0.04% |
| Other race alone (NH) | 0 | 36 | 117 | 93 | 299 | 0.00% | 0.04% | 0.11% | 0.08% | 0.27% |
| Mixed race or Multiracial (NH) | x | x | 1,380 | 2,118 | 4,921 | x | x | 1.32% | 1.89% | 4.49% |
| Hispanic or Latino (any race) | 1,606 | 1,376 | 1,631 | 4,421 | 7,358 | 1.70% | 1.42% | 1.56% | 3.95% | 6.71% |
| Total | 94,393 | 96,982 | 104,503 | 111,860 | 109,580 | 100.00% | 100.00% | 100.00% | 100.00% | 100.00% |

As of the 2020 United States census, there were 109,580 people, 40,173 households, and 28,808 families residing in the parish. The largest single ancestry group amongst its population was French American, at 20%, while 21,253 or 19.4% were African American. The median household income was $48,446; 20% of the population lived at or below the poverty line.

== Education ==
=== Primary and secondary schools ===
Terrebonne Parish School District operates public schools in all of the parish, and its boundary is that of the parish.

The parish has a French immersion public school (independent of the school district), École Pointe-au-Chien.

=== Colleges and universities ===
The parish is in the service area of Fletcher Technical Community College. Additionally, a Delgado Community College document stated that Terrebonne Parish was in the college's service area.

=== Libraries ===
The Terrebonne Parish Library System is the public library system that serves the residents of Terrebonne Parish. The library system grew from a small social club formed in 1927, called B.E.S.T.W.S for the surnames of the six original women who formed the club. In 1929, the club changed its name to the Terrebonne Literary Club and opened a public library in the parish. Today, it consists of eight branch libraries.

Library branches

- Main Library
- Chauvin Branch
- Dulac Branch
- Dularge Branch
- East Houma Branch
- Gibson Branch
- Montegut Branch
- North Branch

== Government ==
The parish has been run by the Terrebonne Parish Consolidated Government since it absorbed the powers of the City of Houma. The parish is led by President Jason Bergeron, elected in 2023. State Representatives Jerome Zeringue, Jessica Domangue, and Beryl Amedee represent Terrebonne Parish in the Louisiana House.

The 32nd Judicial District has five judgeships, all of which are elected at-large. In 2014, Assistant District Attorney Juan Pickett was elected as the first black judge in the parish's history. He ran unopposed as a Republican. In 2015, he switched to the Democratic Party.

Earlier in 2014 the NAACP Legal Defense Fund, in cooperation with local plaintiffs, filed a lawsuit against the state of Louisiana for its system of at-large voting for the five judicial positions in Terrebonne Parish. They said it violated the Voting Rights Act, as it diluted minority voting power. Minority residents in the parish were unable to elect candidates of their choice. Earlier cases that went to the US Supreme Court established that the VRA covered elected judicial positions.

In August 2017 the federal district court in Baton Rouge ruled that the parish's at-large voting was unconstitutional and discriminatory. US District Court Judge James Brady found that

“no black candidate who has faced opposition in Terrebonne has been elected to an at-large position and black candidates have received incredibly minimal support from white voters, a pattern which has been consistent over the course of more than 20 years.”

The parties would be working on a remedy; a minority sub-district has been proposed among five single-member districts to elect these judges. The legislature would have to pass a law establishing such a change. The state said it would appeal the decision.

=== Law enforcement ===
The Terrebonne Parish Sheriff's Office is headquartered at the courthouse annex in Houma. It has about three hundred employees. The office is organized into a number of divisions including: Administration, criminal, civil, communications, corrections, and water Patrol.

Timothy Soignet, the current sheriff, took office on July 1, 2020. Jerry Larpenter, who became sheriff for the first time in 1987, stepped down briefly in 2008, and was re-elected in 2012. He announced he would not seek re-election in October 2019.

In 2017, the parish and the sheriff's office settled a civil case brought against them by a local couple in 2016. The couple operated a web site dedicated to exposing corruption. An individual named on the site filed a criminal defamation complaint with the Sheriff's Office. As a result, a search warrant issued by a parish judge was executed by deputies at the home of the couple, whose computer equipment was seized. No criminal charges were ultimately brought against them. In total the couple received $200,000 in settlements from several parish entities including the Sheriff's Office.

== Representation in other media ==
- The parish is the setting of the film The Skeleton Key (2005). The film was not filmed in the parish itself.
- Terrebonne Parish was the setting for the independent 2012 film Beasts of the Southern Wild, which was filmed in Montegut and inspired by the plight of bayou communities such as Isle de Jean Charles.
- In the DC Comics universe, the parish is the site of the fictional Belle Reve prison.
- The parish is also the setting of A&E's reality series Cajun Justice, about the activities of the Parish Sheriff's Department.
- John Grisham's The Pelican Brief explored environmental issues in the parish resulting from oil production. It was adapted as a The Pelican Brief. The film featured the murders of two Supreme Court justices, and starred Julia Roberts and Denzel Washington.

== National Guard ==
C Company 2-156th Infantry Battalion of the 256th IBCT resides in Houma, Louisiana.

D Company 2-156th Infantry Battalion of the 256 IBCT resides in Thibodaux, Louisiana

== Politics ==
United States presidential election results for Terrebonne Parish, Louisiana
| Year | Republican | | Democratic | | Third party(ies) | |
| Year | No. | % | No. | % | No. | % |
|---|---|---|---|---|---|---|
| 1912 | 89 | 10.83% | 455 | 55.35% | 278 | 33.82% |
| 1916 | 113 | 8.65% | 606 | 46.37% | 588 | 44.99% |
| 1920 | 713 | 59.92% | 477 | 40.08% | 0 | 0.00% |
| 1924 | 415 | 46.27% | 482 | 53.73% | 0 | 0.00% |
| 1928 | 268 | 14.03% | 1,642 | 85.97% | 0 | 0.00% |
| 1932 | 215 | 9.18% | 2,126 | 90.82% | 0 | 0.00% |
| 1936 | 526 | 21.74% | 1,894 | 78.26% | 0 | 0.00% |
| 1940 | 601 | 15.74% | 3,217 | 84.26% | 0 | 0.00% |
| 1944 | 550 | 13.45% | 3,539 | 86.55% | 0 | 0.00% |
| 1948 | 1,048 | 24.18% | 1,262 | 29.12% | 2,024 | 46.70% |
| 1952 | 3,848 | 47.51% | 4,252 | 52.49% | 0 | 0.00% |
| 1956 | 4,983 | 64.85% | 2,460 | 32.01% | 241 | 3.14% |
| 1960 | 3,126 | 23.66% | 8,992 | 68.07% | 1,092 | 8.27% |
| 1964 | 6,729 | 43.96% | 8,577 | 56.04% | 0 | 0.00% |
| 1968 | 5,214 | 27.92% | 4,627 | 24.77% | 8,836 | 47.31% |
| 1972 | 13,753 | 71.70% | 4,415 | 23.02% | 1,014 | 5.29% |
| 1976 | 12,895 | 53.11% | 10,627 | 43.76% | 760 | 3.13% |
| 1980 | 16,644 | 58.03% | 10,804 | 37.67% | 1,233 | 4.30% |
| 1984 | 23,696 | 69.51% | 9,640 | 28.28% | 753 | 2.21% |
| 1988 | 18,745 | 58.19% | 12,686 | 39.38% | 781 | 2.42% |
| 1992 | 14,662 | 42.30% | 13,325 | 38.44% | 6,677 | 19.26% |
| 1996 | 13,944 | 38.35% | 18,550 | 51.02% | 3,867 | 10.64% |
| 2000 | 21,314 | 58.12% | 14,414 | 39.30% | 947 | 2.58% |
| 2004 | 26,358 | 64.96% | 13,684 | 33.73% | 532 | 1.31% |
| 2008 | 28,210 | 69.32% | 11,581 | 28.46% | 905 | 2.22% |
| 2012 | 29,503 | 69.68% | 12,074 | 28.52% | 764 | 1.80% |
| 2016 | 31,902 | 72.68% | 10,665 | 24.30% | 1,329 | 3.03% |
| 2020 | 34,339 | 74.26% | 11,198 | 24.22% | 703 | 1.52% |
| 2024 | 31,115 | 75.29% | 9,702 | 23.48% | 510 | 1.23% |

Since the 20th century, white voters in the parish have become majority Republican. Before the civil rights era, whites generally supported Democratic candidates throughout the South. The Southern Democrats, exclusively white, constituted a powerful block in Congress during the first part of the 20th century. The state legislature had essentially disenfranchised most African Americans at the turn of the century.

Voting in Terrebonne Parish, as in the rest of Louisiana, has been racially polarized since African Americans recovered the ability to register and vote. Most African Americans have voted for Democratic candidates since Congress passed civil rights legislation in the mid-1960s. Since the white majority in the parish shifted to the Republican Party, since 1968 the only Democratic presidential candidate to carry Terrebonne was Bill Clinton, a native son of Arkansas, in 1996.

== See also ==
- Last Islands or Isles Dernières
- National Register of Historic Places listings in Terrebonne Parish, Louisiana
- Terrebonne Parish Sheriff's Office
- USS Terrebonne Parish (LST-1156)
