= Gibson, Louisiana =

Gibson
- Unincorporated community
- Location of Gibson in Louisiana
- Coordinates: 29°41′12″N 90°59′26″W
- Country: United States
- State: Louisiana
- Parish: Terrebonne
- Elevation: 3 ft (0.91 m)
- Time zone: UTC-6 (CST)
  - Summer (DST): UTC-5 (CDT)
- ZIP code: 70356
- Area code: 985

Gibson is an unincorporated community in Terrebonne Parish, Louisiana, United States. The zip code is 70356. It is part of the Houma–Bayou Cane–Thibodaux Metropolitan Statistical Area.

== Geography ==
Gibson is located at 29°41′12″N 90°59′26″W, on LA Highway 182 between Houma and Morgan City.

== Education ==
Terrebonne Parish School District operates public schools. Gibson Elementary School is located in the community.

Terrebonne Parish Public Library operates the Gibson Branch.
