= Dulac, Louisiana =

Dulac
- CDP
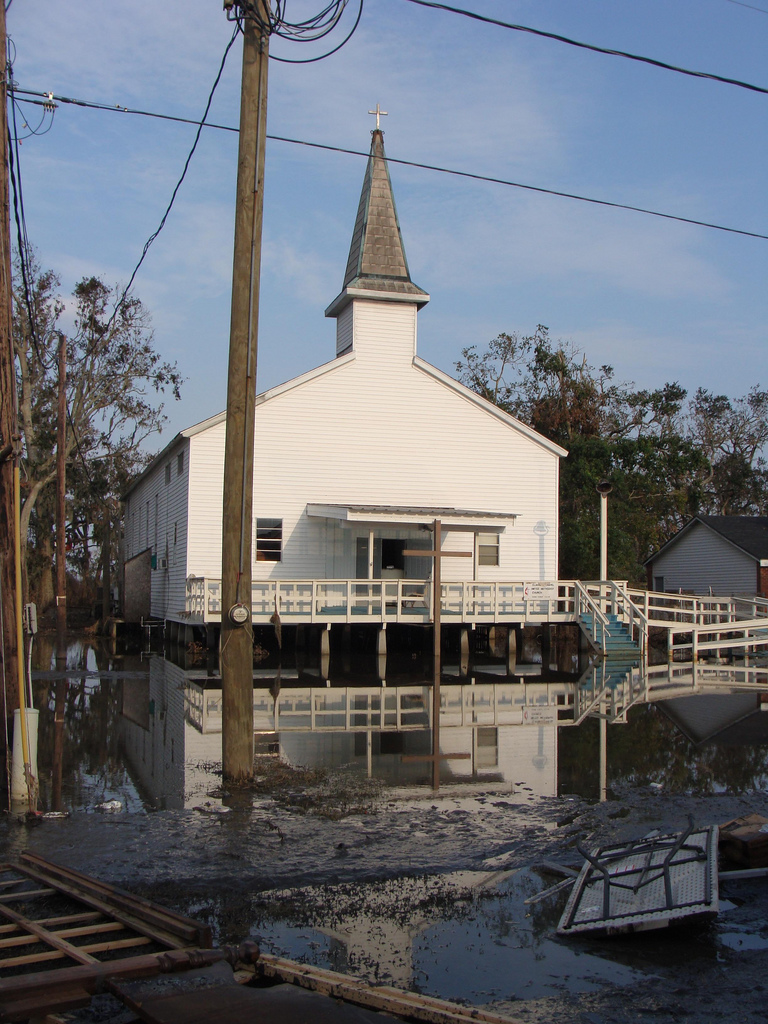
- Church in Dulac after Hurricane Ike flooding

- Location of Dulac in Louisiana
- Coordinates: 29°23′05″N 90°41′49″W
- Country: United States
- State: Louisiana
- Parish: Terrebonne

Area
  - Total: 18.15 sq mi (47.02 km^{2})
  - Land: 15.99 sq mi (41.41 km^{2})
  - Water: 2.17 sq mi (5.61 km^{2})
- Elevation: 3 ft (0.91 m)

Population (2020)
  - Total: 1,241
  - Density: 77.6/sq mi (29.97/km^{2})
- Time zone: UTC-6 (CST)
  - Summer (DST): UTC-5 (CDT)
- Area code: 985
- FIPS code: 22-21940

Dulac is a census-designated place (CDP) in Terrebonne Parish, Louisiana, United States. The population was 1,241 in 2020. It is part of the Houma–Bayou Cane–Thibodaux metropolitan statistical area.

== Geography ==
Dulac is located at 29°23′5″N 90°41′49″W (29.384672, -90.696891). According to the United States Census Bureau, the CDP has a total area of 26.4 square miles (68 km^{2}), of which 21.4 square miles (55 km^{2}) is land and 5.0 square miles (13 km^{2}) (18.83%) is water.

== Demographics ==
Historical population
Census	Pop.	Note	%±
1990	3,273		—
2000	2,458		−24.9%
2010	1,463		−40.5%
2020	1,241		−15.2%
U.S. Decennial Census; 1950 1960 1970 1980; 1990 2000 2010

Dulac first appeared as a census designated place the 1990 U.S. census.

Dulac racial composition as of 2020
Race	Number	Percentage
White (non-Hispanic)	566	45.61%
Black or African American (non-Hispanic)	42	3.38%
Native American	438	35.29%
Asian	26	2.1%
Other/Mixed	94	7.57%
Hispanic or Latino	75	6.04%

As of the 2020 United States census, there were 1,241 people, 521 households, and 283 families residing in the CDP.

Largest ancestries (2000)	Percent
Houma	27.8%
French (France)	22.5%
French Canadian (France) (Canada)	8.9%
American (United States)	6.0%
Italian (Italy)	4.5%
English (England)	3.3%
Irish (Republic of Ireland)	1.9%
Polish (Poland)	0.5%
German (Germany)	0.4%
Welsh (Wales)	0.4%

Languages (2000)	Percent
Spoke English at home	63.56%
Spoke French at home	33.47%
Spoke Cajun French at home	2.97%

As of the census of 2000, there were 2,458 people, 768 households, and 609 families residing in the CDP. The population density was 114.8 inhabitants per square mile (44.3/km^{2}). There were 1,063 housing units at an average density of 49.6 per square mile (19.2/km^{2}). The racial makeup of the CDP was 53.99% White, 2.48% African American, 39.42% Native American, 0.49% Asian, 0.49% from other races, and 3.13% from two or more races. Hispanic or Latino of any race were 1.71% of the population.

There were 768 households, out of which 36.6% had children under the age of 18 living with them, 57.9% were married couples living together, 14.2% had a female householder with no husband present, and 20.7% were non-families. 16.0% of all households were made up of individuals, and 7.6% had someone living alone who was 65 years of age or older. The average household size was 3.20 and the average family size was 3.55.

In the CDP, the population was spread out, with 31.4% under the age of 18, 10.5% from 18 to 24, 25.4% from 25 to 44, 22.8% from 45 to 64, and 9.8% who were 65 years of age or older. The median age was 32 years. For every 100 females, there were 100.0 males. For every 100 females age 18 and over, there were 98.6 males. The median income for a household in the CDP was $22,900, and the median income for a family was $23,650. Males had a median income of $24,815 versus $17,045 for females. The per capita income for the CDP was $8,785. About 27.8% of families and 30.9% of the population were below the poverty line, including 39.8% of those under age 18 and 17.4% of those age 65 or over.

== Education ==
The school district is Terrebonne Parish School District, as with other locations in the parish.

Terrebonne Parish Library operates the Dulac Library.
