= Verdun, Louisiana =

Unincorporated community in Louisiana

- Unincorporated community
- Location within Louisiana Location within the United States
- Coordinates: 30°26′09″N 90°40′19″W
- Country: United States
- State: Louisiana
- Parish: Livingston
- Elevation: 16 ft (4.9 m)
- Time zone: UTC-6 (Central (CST))
  - Summer (DST): UTC-5 (CDT)
- ZIP code: 70754
- Area code: 225
- GNIS feature ID: 540147
- FIPS code: 22-78155

Verdun is an unincorporated community in Livingston Parish, Louisiana, United States. The community is located less than 4 miles (6.4 kilometres) east of French Settlement and 5 miles (8.0 kilometres) northwest of Maurepas.
