= L. E. Fletcher Technical Community College =

Community college in Schriever, Louisiana, US

Coordinates: 29°41′27″N 90°48′42″W

- Type: Community college
- Established: June 23, 1948
- Location: Schriever, Louisiana, United States
- Website: www.fletcher.edu

L. E. Fletcher Technical Community College is a community college in Schriever, Louisiana, United States, in Terrebonne Parish. The school was founded on June 23, 1948.

Its service area includes Iberia, Lafourche, St. Mary, and Terrebonne parishes, as well as the southern section of St. Martin Parish.

== Academics ==
The college provides both academic and technical training. It offers programs in arts and sciences, business, manufacturing and services, nursing and health, and Petroleum.
