= Cocodrie, Louisiana =

Cocodrie
- Unincorporated community
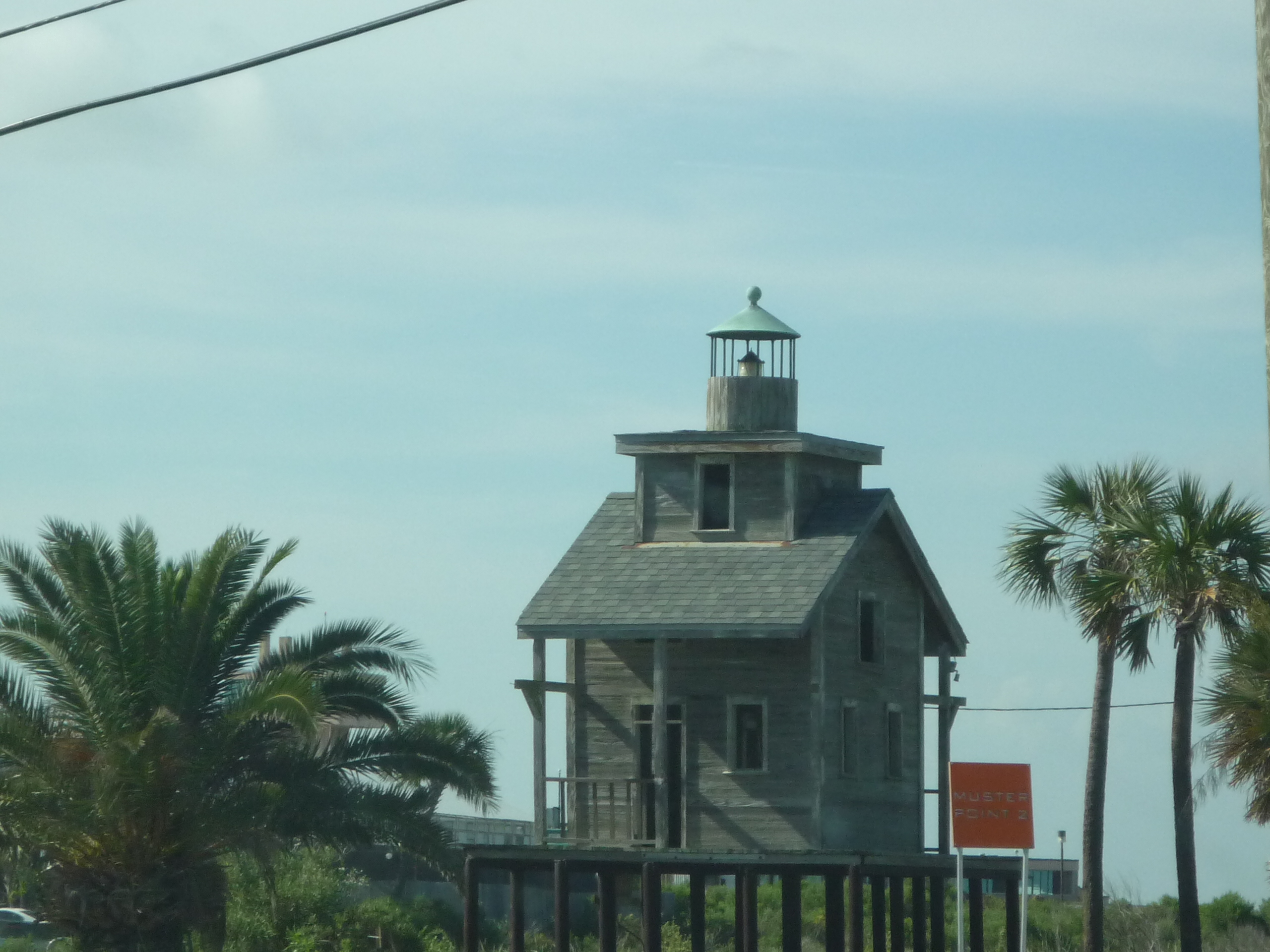

- Location of Cocodrie in Louisiana
- Coordinates: 29°14′49″N 90°39′41″W
- Country: United States
- State: Louisiana
- Parish: Terrebonne
- Named for: Louisiana French for Alligator
- Elevation: 3 ft (0.91 m)
- Time zone: UTC-6 (CST)
  - Summer (DST): UTC-5 (CDT)
- Area code: 985

Cocodrie is an unincorporated fishing, shrimping and crabbing village in Terrebonne Parish, Louisiana, United States, 10 miles south of Chauvin and due south of the city of Houma. It is part of the Houma–Bayou Cane–Thibodaux Metropolitan Statistical Area. The settlement is known for being very near the landfall location for Tropical Storm Matthew on October 10, 2004, Hurricane Gustav on September 1, 2008, and Hurricane Zeta on October 28, 2020.

The name Cocodrie is Louisiana French for "alligator" or more rarely "crocodile". It is a waterfront town, located due west of Grand Isle, on an inlet of another bay blocked by several barrier islands along the Gulf of Mexico. Cocodrie is connected to Houma, due north, by Louisiana Highway 56. It is at the end of the highway. Most buildings in Cocodrie are now elevated on pilings to minimize flood damage.

Cocodrie is home to the Louisiana Universities Marine Consortium (LUMCON) W. J. DeFelice Marine Center, which was completed in 1986.

== Impact from Hurricane Gustav ==
On September 1, 2008, Hurricane Gustav, coming from Cuba, made a technical landfall near Cocodrie, around 9:30 a.m. CDT. When Hurricane Gustav came from the southeast, the hurricane force winds (up to 115 mph, 180 km/h) extended for 70 miles from the eye center, impacting the area with north-to-south winds for over five hours before making landfall.

== In popular culture ==
- Cocodrie is mentioned in the Swamp Thing comic books.
- Cocodrie was featured in the Insomniac Games PlayStation 3 game Resistance 2 between the Holar Tower and Chicxulub Crater levels. The level consists of a plantation style environment surrounded by swamp and marshlands and includes a large bridge later on into the level which highly resembles a single span of the Crescent City Connection which is located in New Orleans, approximately 85 miles northeast of Cocodrie.

== See also ==
- Buras-Triumph, Louisiana - a landfall site of Hurricane Katrina (2nd of 3 USA landfalls)
- Pearlington, Mississippi - a landfall site of Hurricane Katrina (3rd of 3 USA landfalls)
