= Montegut, Louisiana =

Montegut
- CDP
- Location of Montegut in Louisiana
- Coordinates: 29°28′25″N 90°33′19″W
- Country: United States
- State: Louisiana
- Parish: Terrebonne

Area
  - Total: 4.52 sq mi (11.70 km^{2})
  - Land: 4.21 sq mi (10.90 km^{2})
  - Water: 0.31 sq mi (0.80 km^{2})
- Elevation: 7 ft (2.1 m)

Population (2020)
  - Total: 1,465
  - Density: 350/sq mi (134/km^{2})
- Time zone: UTC-6 (CST)
  - Summer (DST): UTC-5 (CDT)
- ZIP code: 70377
- Area code: 985
- FIPS code: 22-51550

Montegut is a census-designated place (CDP) in Terrebonne Parish, Louisiana, United States. As of the 2020 census, Montegut had a population of 1,465. It is part of the Houma–Bayou Cane–Thibodaux metropolitan statistical area. Montegut was the primary filming location for the 2012 film Beasts of the Southern Wild.

== History ==
Montegut developed around a sugar mill founded in 1883. Named by Congressman Edward James Gay when the post office was opened in 1885, it honored Gabriel Montegut, a prominent resident of parish seat Houma.

The 1941 WPA guide to Louisiana reported an elevation of 8 feet and population of 200.

== Geography ==
Montegut is located at 29°28′25″N 90°33′19″W (29.473700, -90.555381).

According to the United States Census Bureau, the CDP has a total area of 4.5 square miles (11.8 km^{2}), of which 4.5 square miles (11.6 km^{2}) is land and 0.1 square mile (0.2 km^{2}) (1.54%) is water.

== Demographics ==
Historical population
Census	Pop.	Note	%±
1990	1,784		—
2000	1,803		1.1%
2010	1,540		−14.6%
2020	1,465		−4.9%
U.S. Decennial Census; 1950 1960 1970 1980; 1990 2000 2010

Montegut first appeared as a census designated place the 1990 U.S. census.

Montegut racial composition as of 2020
Race	Number	Percentage
White (non-Hispanic)	1,093	74.61%
Black or African American (non-Hispanic)	27	1.84%
Native American	176	12.01%
Asian	5	0.34%
Pacific Islander	1	0.14%
Other/Mixed	131	8.94%
Hispanic or Latino	31	2.12%

As of the 2020 United States census, there were 1,465 people, 594 households, and 443 families residing in the CDP.

== Education ==
Terrebonne Parish School District operates public schools. Montegut Elementary School and Montegut Middle School are in the community.

École Pointe-au-Chien, a public school (non-district) in Pointe-aux-Chenes, has a Montegut postal address, though it is not in the Montegut CDP. It was the former Pointe-aux-Chenes Elementary School, a Terrebonne Parish public school which closed in 2021.

The parish is in the service area of Fletcher Technical Community College. Additionally, a Delgado Community College document stated that Terrebonne Parish was in the college's service area.

== In popular culture ==
The 2012 film Beasts of the Southern Wild was filmed in Montegut. Director Benh Zeitlin and his crew worked out of an abandoned gas station in town. They built the film's fictional settlement—the "Bathtub"—by hand with found artifacts and rusted-out equipment from the surrounding area. The film was nominated for four Academy Awards.

== Notable people ==
Allen J. Ellender, a Senator from Louisiana from 1937 to 1972, and the President pro Tempore of the U.S. Senate from 1971 to 1972, was born here.
