= Bayou Cane, Louisiana =

- Census-designated place
- Location of Bayou Cane in Louisiana
- Coordinates: 29°37′35″N 90°44′54″W
- Country: United States
- State: Louisiana
- Parish: Terrebonne

Area
  - Total: 7.61 sq mi (19.72 km^{2})
  - Land: 7.61 sq mi (19.72 km^{2})
  - Water: 0 sq mi (0.00 km^{2})
- Elevation: 7 ft (2.1 m)

Population (2020)
  - Total: 19,770
  - Density: 2,597.0/sq mi (1,002.71/km^{2})
- Time zone: UTC-6 (CST)
  - Summer (DST): UTC-5 (CDT)
- Area code: 985
- FIPS code: 22-05210

Bayou Cane is a census-designated place (CDP) in Terrebonne Parish, Louisiana, United States. It is located just north of Houma and had a population of 19,770 in 2020.

Bayou Cane is a principal city of the Houma–Bayou Cane–Thibodaux metropolitan statistical area, which includes all of Terrebonne and Lafourche parishes.

== Geography ==
Bayou Cane is located at 29°37′35″N 90°44′54″W (29.626285, -90.748396).

According to the United States Census Bureau, the CDP has a total area of 7.6 square miles (20 km^{2}), all land.

== Demographics ==
Historical population
Census	Pop.	Note	%±
1950	2,212		—
1960	3,173		43.4%
1970	9,077		186.1%
1980	15,723		73.2%
1990	15,876		1.0%
2000	17,046		7.4%
2010	19,335		13.4%
2020	19,770		2.2%
U.S. Decennial Census; 1950 1960 1970 1980; 1990 2000 2010

Bayou Cane first appeared as an unincorporated place in the 1950 U.S. census; and as a census designated place in the 1980 United States census.

Bayou Cane racial composition as of 2020
Race	Number	Percentage
White (non-Hispanic)	12,992	65.72%
Black or African American (non-Hispanic)	3,520	17.8%
Native American	689	3.49%
Asian	296	1.5%
Pacific Islander	13	0.07%
Other/Mixed	973	4.92%
Hispanic or Latino	1,287	6.51%

As of the 2020 United States census, there were 19,770 people, 7,500 households, and 4,761 families residing in the CDP.

== Education ==
Bayou Cane is in the Terrebonne Parish School Board district.

Vandebilt Catholic High School is in Bayou Cane.

== Economy ==
Southland Mall is in Bayou Cane CDP.
