= List of state highways in Louisiana (650–699) =

The following is a list of state highways in the U.S. state of Louisiana designated in the 650–699 range.

== Louisiana Highway 650 ==
Louisiana Highway 650
- Location: Gray–Schriever
- Length: 3.5 mi (5.6 km)
- Existed: 1955–1980

Louisiana Highway 650 (LA 650) ran 3.5 miles (5.6 km) in a southeast to northwest direction between Gray and Schriever, Terrebonne Parish.

From the southeast, LA 650 began at an intersection with LA 316 (Bayou Blue Road) at a point just east of Gray. It proceeded in a northerly direction along Bayou Blue Bypass Road. LA 650 briefly jogged to the east then back to the north, separating from Bayou Blue Bypass Road. It continued north along the Terrebonne – Lafourche Parish line to Martinez Road. Here it turned west onto Waterplant Road, skirting the southern boundary of Schriever. LA 650 entered Schriever then made a jog to the north and back to the west, proceeding to its terminus at LA 24.

LA 650 was an undivided two-lane highway for its entire length.

The entire highway was in Terrebonne Parish.

Location	mi	km	Destinations	Notes
	0.0	0.0	LA 316 (Bayou Blue Road) – Gray, Houma	Southern terminus
Schriever	3.5	5.6	LA 24 – Thibodaux, Houma	Northern terminus
1.000 mi = 1.609 km; 1.000 km = 0.621 mi

== Louisiana Highway 651 ==
Louisiana Highway 651
- Location: Raceland
- Length: 1.3 mi (2.1 km)
- Existed: 1955–1975

Louisiana Highway 651 (LA 651) ran 1.3 miles (2.1 km) in a north–south direction along Bowie Road in Raceland, Lafourche Parish.

The route began at LA 308, which runs along Bayou Lafourche, and proceeded to a point on the Texas & New Orleans Railroad line (now the BNSF/Union Pacific Railroad) where the community of Bowie was once located. It was an undivided, two-lane highway for its entire length. Now a ghost town, Bowie once thrived around a lumber mill served by the rail line north of Raceland in the early 20th century.

In the pre-1955 state highway system, LA 651 was designated as State Route 891. LA 651 was created with the 1955 Louisiana Highway renumbering and deleted from the state highway system in 1975.

The entire highway was in Lafourche Parish.

Location	mi	km	Destinations	Notes
Raceland	0.0	0.0	LA 308 – Thibodaux, Lockport	Southern terminus
Bowie	1.3	2.1	End state maintenance near the Texas & New Orleans Railroad crossing	Northern terminus
1.000 mi = 1.609 km; 1.000 km = 0.621 mi

== Louisiana Highway 652 ==
Louisiana Highway 652
- Location: Raceland
- Length: 3.72 mi (5.99 km)
- Existed: 1955–present

Louisiana Highway 652 (LA 652) runs 3.72 miles (5.99 km) in a north–south direction from a dead end at Bayou Cut Off to LA 182 in Raceland, Lafourche Parish.

The route initially heads west from a boat launch on Bayou Cut Off then turns north and crosses US 90 via an overpass. The freeway is accessed indirectly by the north service road. LA 652 zigzags west, then northwest along Bayou Folse, north across Bayou Cutoff, and finally northwest a short distance to an intersection with LA 182 just inside Raceland. LA 652 is an undivided two-lane highway for its entire length.

The entire highway is in Lafourche Parish.

Location	mi	km	Destinations	Notes
	0.0	0.0	Dead end at Bayou Cut Off	Southern terminus
	1.5	2.4	US 90 – New Orleans, Morgan City	LA 652 crosses over US 90; indirect access via North Service Road
Raceland	3.7	6.0	LA 182 – Houma, New Orleans	Northern terminus
1.000 mi = 1.609 km; 1.000 km = 0.621 mi: Incomplete access

== Louisiana Highway 653 ==
Louisiana Highway 653
- Location: Lafourche Parish
- Length: 2.58 mi (4.15 km)
- Existed: 1955–present

Louisiana Highway 653 (LA 653) runs 2.58 miles (4.15 km) in a north–south direction from a local road south of Bayou Du Mar to LA 182 south of Raceland, Lafourche Parish.

The route heads north from an intersection with Eagle Island Road, a local road, and crosses Bayou Du Mar. It then crosses US 90 via an overpass. The freeway is accessed indirectly by the north service road. LA 653 continues north to an intersection with LA 182 south of Raceland. It is an undivided two-lane highway for its entire length.

Until recently, LA 653 extended west from its current southern terminus along what is now a private road to a second intersection with LA 182, existing as a loop off of that highway. In this form, LA 653 was part of the original route of the Old Spanish Trail, designated as State Route 2 in 1921 (in the pre-1955 Louisiana Highway system) and US 90 in 1926. This route was bypassed in 1938 when US 90 was moved onto what is now LA 182. LA 182 was then bypassed by the current route of US 90 in 1977 (north of Exit 210) and in 1999 (south of Exit 210).

The entire route is in Lafourche Parish.

mi	km	Destinations	Notes
0.0	0.0	Begin state maintenance at Eagle Island Road, a local road	Southern terminus
1.5	2.4	US 90 – New Orleans, Morgan City	LA 653 crosses over US 90; indirect access via North Service Road
2.5	4.0	LA 182 – Raceland, Houma	Northern terminus
1.000 mi = 1.609 km; 1.000 km = 0.621 mi: Incomplete access

== Louisiana Highway 654 ==
Louisiana Highway 654
- Location: Mathews–Gheens
- Length: 5.51 mi (8.87 km)
- Existed: 1955–present

Louisiana Highway 654 (LA 654) runs 5.51 miles (8.87 km) in an east–west direction from LA 1 in Mathews to the Company Canal bridge northwest of Gheens, Lafourche Parish.

The route heads northeast from LA 1 and immediately crosses a vertical lift bridge over Bayou Lafourche. It then intersects LA 308 which, like LA 1, follows alongside the bayou. 4.4 miles (7.1 km) later, LA 654 curves to the south and proceeds a short distance to a bridge at the Company Canal. A private road crosses the canal and proceeds toward the Golden Ranch Plantation in Gheens. LA 654 is an undivided two-lane highway for its entire length.

The entire highway is in Lafourche Parish.

Location	mi	km	Destinations	Notes
Mathews	0.0	0.0	LA 1 – Raceland, Lockport	Western terminus
Mathews	0.1	0.16	LA 308 – Raceland, Lockport	
	5.5	8.9	End state maintenance at Company Canal bridge	Eastern terminus
1.000 mi = 1.609 km; 1.000 km = 0.621 mi

== Louisiana Highway 655 ==
Louisiana Highway 655
- Location: Lockport–Rita
- Length: 0.620 mi (998 m)
- Existed: 1955–present

Louisiana Highway 655 (LA 655) runs 0.62 miles (1.00 km) in an east–west direction from a local road in Lockport to LA 308 in Rita, Lafourche Parish.

The route begins at the intersection of Main and Vacherie Streets in Lockport. It immediately crosses a swing bridge across Bayou Lafourche into the unincorporated community of Rita. It then turns east and follows East Main Street to a junction with LA 308, the primary highway along the east bank of the bayou. LA 655 is an undivided two-lane highway for its entire length. A spur, 0.44 miles (0.71 km) in length and signed as the mainline route, follows Vacherie Street in Lockport from the bridge to LA 1 (Crescent Avenue).

LA 655 was formerly a loop that encompassed Main Street in Lockport, connecting with LA 1 on the east side of Lockport. The route also had a spur, signed as the mainline route, that consisted of an alternate connection to LA 1 along Vacherie Street in Lockport. This mileage was all transferred to local control in 2019 as part of La DOTD's Road Transfer Program.

The entire highway is in Lafourche Parish.

Location	mi	km	Destinations	Notes
Lockport	0.000	0.000	Begin state maintenance at the intersection of Main and Vacherie Streets	Western terminus
Lockport	0.008– 0.048	0.013– 0.077	Bridge over Bayou Lafourche	
Rita	0.620	0.998	LA 308 – Raceland, Larose	Eastern terminus
1.000 mi = 1.609 km; 1.000 km = 0.621 mi

== Louisiana Highway 656 ==
Louisiana Highway 656
- Location: Lafourche Parish
- Length: 1.5 mi (2.4 km)
- Existed: 1955–1993

Louisiana Highway 656 (LA 656) ran 1.5 miles (2.4 km) in a west–east direction along Lake Long Drive near the Lafourche–Terrebonne Parish line northeast of Houma.

The route proceeded eastward from an intersection with LA 316 (Bayou Blue Road) along the remains of Lake Long Bayou to a dead end west of the Company Canal and Lake Long. It was an undivided, two-lane highway for its entire length.

In the pre-1955 state highway system, LA 656 was designated as State Route C-1798. LA 656 was created with the 1955 Louisiana Highway renumbering and deleted in 1993.

The entire highway was in Lafourche Parish.

Location	mi	km	Destinations	Notes
	0.0	0.0	LA 316 (Bayou Blue Road) – Houma, Bourg	Western terminus
	1.5	2.4	End state maintenance west of Company Canal	Eastern terminus
1.000 mi = 1.609 km; 1.000 km = 0.621 mi

== Louisiana Highway 657 ==
Louisiana Highway 657
- Location: Larose
- Length: 2.51 mi (4.04 km)
- Existed: 1955–present

Louisiana Highway 657 (LA 657) runs 2.51 miles (4.04 km) in a north–south direction from LA 3235 in Larose to the end of state maintenance just north of Larose in Lafourche Parish.

The route heads northeast from LA 3235 and intersects LA 1, which follows the west bank of Bayou Lafourche. It proceeds immediately across a vertical lift bridge over the bayou and intersects LA 308. Here, LA 657 turns west alongside Bayou Lafourche while LA 308 continues straight ahead. Reaching the Gulf Intracoastal Waterway, LA 657 turns again to the northeast and crosses underneath LA 308. State maintenance ends just beyond Pump Station 7 Road, a local road. LA 657 is an undivided two-lane highway for its entire length.

The entire highway is in Lafourche Parish.

Location	mi	km	Destinations	Notes
Larose	0.0	0.0	LA 3235 – Galliano, Grand Isle	Southern terminus
Larose	0.5	0.80	LA 1 – Lockport, Grand Isle	
Larose	0.6	0.97	LA 308 – Lockport, Grand Isle	
	2.4	3.9	End state maintenance north of Pump Station 7 Road, a local road	Northern terminus
1.000 mi = 1.609 km; 1.000 km = 0.621 mi

== Louisiana Highway 658 ==
Louisiana Highway 658
- Location: Schriever
- Length: 0.69 mi (1,110 m)
- Existed: 1955–1973

Louisiana Highway 658 (LA 658) ran 0.69 miles (1.11 km) in a west–east direction between two points along LA 20 in Schriever, Terrebonne Parish.

The route proceeded north from LA 20 along North Main Project Road (Parish Road 29), immediately crossing the Southern Pacific Railroad tracks (now the BNSF/Union Pacific Railroad). LA 658 then turned east onto Broadway Avenue, running parallel with the rail line, and continued to a point on the bypassed portion of LA 20 now known as Old Schriever Highway. It was an undivided, two-lane highway for its entire length.

In the pre-1955 state highway system, LA 658 was designated as State Route C-1982. LA 658 was created with the 1955 Louisiana Highway renumbering and deleted in 1973. LA 20 had been realigned onto a new railroad overpass about five years earlier, eliminating the at-grade crossing with the rail line and the direct connection between the two highways.

The entire highway was in Schriever, Terrebonne Parish.

mi	km	Destinations	Notes
0.00	0.00	LA 20 – Thibodaux, Morgan City	Western terminus
0.69	1.11	LA 20 – Thibodaux, Morgan City	Eastern terminus
1.000 mi = 1.609 km; 1.000 km = 0.621 mi

== Louisiana Highway 659 ==
Louisiana Highway 659
- Location: Houma
- Length: 4.42 mi (7.11 km)
- Existed: 1955–present

Louisiana Highway 659 (LA 659) runs 4.42 miles (7.11 km) in an east–west direction from LA 24 in Houma to a second junction with LA 24 at Presquille, Terrebonne Parish.

The route heads east from LA 24, which changes from a divided four-lane highway flanking Bayou Terrebonne to an undivided two-lane highway running along the west bank of the bayou. LA 659 proceeds along the east bank and exits the city of Houma. After curving to the southeast, it intersects LA 3087 (Prospect Boulevard). The highway continues southeast to Presquille and a second intersection with LA 24, which crosses to the east bank of the bayou. LA 659 is an undivided two-lane highway for its entire length.

The entire highway is in Terrebonne Parish.

Location	mi	km	Destinations	Notes
Houma	0.0	0.0	LA 24 (Park Avenue) to LA 57	Western terminus
	1.7	2.7	LA 3087 (Prospect Boulevard)	
Presquille	4.4	7.1	LA 24 – Bourg, Larose	Eastern terminus
1.000 mi = 1.609 km; 1.000 km = 0.621 mi

== Louisiana Highway 660 ==
Louisiana Highway 660
- Location: Houma
- Length: 8.32 mi (13.39 km)
- Existed: 1955–present

Louisiana Highway 660 (LA 660) runs 8.32 miles (13.39 km) in an east–west direction along Coteau Road from LA 24 in Gray to LA 316 northeast of Houma, Terrebonne Parish.

The route heads northeast from LA 24, which travels on either side of Bayou Terrebonne. It then curves to the southeast, running parallel to the limits of Bayou Cane and Houma. LA 660 intersects LA 182 and LA 3087, which connect Houma to eastbound US 90. The route ends at an intersection with LA 316 on the Terrebonne–Lafourche parish line. It is an undivided two-lane highway for its entire length.

Parish	Location	mi	km	Destinations	Notes
Terrebonne	Gray	0.0	0.0	LA 24 (West Main Street, West Park Avenue) – Houma, Thibodaux	Western terminus
Terrebonne		4.7	7.6	LA 182 – Houma, New Orleans	
Terrebonne		7.4	11.9	LA 3087 (Prospect Boulevard)	
Terrebonne–Lafourche parish line		8.3	13.4	LA 316 (Bayou Blue Road) – Gray, Bourg	Eastern terminus
1.000 mi = 1.609 km; 1.000 km = 0.621 mi

== Louisiana Highway 661 ==
Louisiana Highway 661
- Location: Houma
- Length: 2.61 mi (4.20 km)
- Existed: 1955–present

Louisiana Highway 661 (LA 661) runs 2.61 miles (4.20 km) in a north–south direction from LA 315 south of Houma to LA 24 in Houma, Terrebonne Parish.

The route heads northeast from an interchange with LA 315 (Bayou Dularge Road) and immediately crosses a swing bridge over the Houma Navigation Canal. It then crosses a vertical lift bridge over Bayou La Carpe and enters the city of Houma where it travels along South Van Avenue. In Houma, LA 661 intersects LA 57 (Grand Caillou Road) and LA 3040 (Tunnel Boulevard). Crossing LA 3040, the highway curves to the north as Howard Avenue and proceeds to LA 24 (Main Street) at Bayou Terrebonne. A locally maintained vertical lift bridge crosses the bayou and connects to LA 659 (Park Avenue), which follows the opposite bank. LA 661 is an undivided two-lane highway for its entire length.

The entire highway is in Terrebonne Parish.

Location	mi	km	Destinations	Notes
	0.0	0.0	LA 315 (Bayou Du Large Road) – Theriot, Dularge	Western terminus; interchange
Houma	1.7	2.7	LA 57 (Grand Caillou Road) – Dulac, New Orleans	
Houma	2.1	3.4	LA 3040 (Tunnel Boulevard)	Southeastern terminus of LA 3040
Houma	2.5	4.0	LA 24 (Main Street)	Eastern terminus
1.000 mi = 1.609 km; 1.000 km = 0.621 mi

== Louisiana Highway 662 ==
Louisiana Highway 662
- Location: Assumption Parish
- Length: 11.2 mi (18.0 km)
- Existed: 1955–present

Louisiana Highway 662 (LA 662) runs 11.2 miles (18.0 km) in a long loop off of US 90 and its former alignment, LA 182, with the western end extending down to the Intracoastal Waterway south of Boeuf.

LA 662 heads north on Oilfield Road through Boeuf and crosses underneath the Bayou Boeuf bridge on US 90 Bus./LA 182. It immediately turns east, briefly running alongside US 90 Bus./LA 182 before resuming its northern course, now in a concurrency with US 90 Bus. (LA 182 continues eastward into Terrebonne Parish alone.) The concurrency ends at an interchange with Exit 182 on US 90, after which LA 662 proceeds north then curves northeast to Bayou L'Ourse, intersecting LA 663 and LA 398. The latter heads north to Labadieville, connecting LA 662 with the rest of Assumption Parish. LA 662 then curves back to the southeast, passing through a second interchange with US 90 at Exit 185 and terminating at LA 182 in an area known as Zacarter.

LA 662 is generally an undivided two-lane highway but widens to a divided four-lane highway in the vicinity of the two interchanges with US 90.

Parish	Location	mi	km	Destinations	Notes
Assumption		0.0	0.0	Begin state maintenance on Oilfield Road	Western terminus
Assumption	Boeuf	1.6	2.6	US 90 Bus.	West end of US 90 Bus. concurrency
Assumption		2.0	3.2	US 90 – Morgan City, New Orleans US 90 Bus.	East end of US 90 Bus. concurrency; exit 182 on US 90
Assumption		5.4	8.7	LA 663	Western terminus of LA 663
Assumption	Bayou L'Ourse	6.7	10.8	LA 398	Southern terminus of LA 398
Terrebonne	Zacarter	10.8	17.4	US 90 – Morgan City, New Orleans	Exit 185 on US 90
Terrebonne	Zacarter	11.2	18.0	LA 182 – Morgan City, Houma	Eastern terminus
1.000 mi = 1.609 km; 1.000 km = 0.621 mi: Concurrency terminus

== Louisiana Highway 663 ==
Louisiana Highway 663
- Location: Bayou L'Ourse
- Length: 1.87 mi (3.01 km)

Louisiana Highway 663 (LA 663) runs 1.87 miles (3.01 km) in Bayou L'Ourse.

== Louisiana Highway 664 ==
Louisiana Highway 664
- Location: Houma–Bayou Cane
- Length: 0.82 mi (1,320 m)
- Existed: 1955–present

Louisiana Highway 664 (LA 664) runs 0.82 miles (1.32 km) in a north–south direction along St. Charles Street in Houma, Terrebonne Parish.

The route begins at LA 311 (Little Bayou Black Drive) and proceeds north along the Houma–Bayou Cane line. Almost midway through its route, LA 664 intersects LA 3040 (Tunnel Boulevard), a four-lane highway that runs southeast to northwest through Houma and Bayou Cane. At the end of its route, LA 664 intersects eastbound LA 24 (Main Street), crosses a bridge over Bayou Terrebonne, and terminates at westbound LA 24 (Park Avenue). LA 664 is an undivided four-lane highway with center turning lane from LA 311 to LA 3040, after which point it narrows to an undivided two-lane highway for the remainder of its route.

In the pre-1955 state highway system, LA 664 was designated as State Route C-2190. LA 664 was created with the 1955 Louisiana Highway renumbering, and its route has remained the same to the present day.

The entire highway is in Terrebonne Parish.

Location	mi	km	Destinations	Notes
Houma–Bayou Cane line	0.00	0.00	LA 311 (Little Bayou Black Drive)	Southern terminus
Houma–Bayou Cane line	0.29	0.47	LA 3040 (Tunnel Boulevard)	
Bayou Cane	0.82	1.32	LA 24 (Main Street, Park Avenue) – Schriever, Thibodaux	Northern terminus
1.000 mi = 1.609 km; 1.000 km = 0.621 mi

== Louisiana Highway 665 ==
Louisiana Highway 665
- Location: Point Aux Chenes
- Length: 9.88 mi (15.90 km)
- Existed: 1955–present

Louisiana Highway 665 (LA 665) runs 9.88 miles (15.90 km) in a northwest to southeast direction from LA 55 in Montegut to a dead end at the Cutoff Canal southeast of Montegut, Terrebonne Parish.

The route initially heads northeast from LA 57 in an area known as Pointe Aux Chenes at the northern limit of Montegut. After 1.1 miles (1.8 km), LA 665 turns to the southeast to run alongside Bayou Pointe Au Chien. The highway continues for another 8.8 miles (14.2 km) to the Pointe Au Chien Landing at the Cutoff Canal. LA 665 is an undivided two-lane highway for its entire length.

The entire highway is in Terrebonne Parish.

Location	mi	km	Destinations	Notes
Montegut	0.0	0.0	LA 55 (Montegut Road) – Montegut, Houma	Western terminus; location also known as Pointe Aux Chenes
	9.9	15.9	Dead end at Cutoff Canal	Eastern terminus
1.000 mi = 1.609 km; 1.000 km = 0.621 mi

== Louisiana Highway 668 ==
Louisiana Highway 668
- Location: Julien–Jeanerette
- Length: 6.58 mi (10.59 km)

Louisiana Highway 668 (LA 668) runs 6.58 miles (10.59 km) from Julien to Jeanerette.

== Louisiana Highway 670 ==
Louisiana Highway 670
- Location: Adeline
- Length: 0.24 mi (390 m)
- Existed: 1955–present

Louisiana Highway 670 (LA 670) is a short 0.24-mile-long (0.39 km) state highway near Adeline, St. Mary Parish. It connects LA 182 on the south to LA 87 on the north crossing the Bayou Teche on a movable bridge. The highway only intersects one other road, Chitimacha Trail, on the south side of the bayou.

== Louisiana Highway 671 ==
Louisiana Highway 671
- Location: Jeanerette
- Length: 1.71 mi (2.75 km)
- Existed: 1955–present

Louisiana Highway 671 (LA 671) is a 1.7-mile-long (2.7 km) state highway located entirely within the city limits of Jeanerette in central Iberia Parish. It travels between LA 668 and LA 87 and has a short concurrency with LA 182 in downtown Jeanerette.

LA 671 begins at the intersection of LA 668 (East Admiral Doyle Drive) on the boundary between Jeanerette and unincorporated Iberia Parish just northeast of an interchange with U.S. Route 90 and Future Interstate 49. It travels northeast along the two-lane Canal Street in a relatively rural part of the city. After about three-quarters mile (1.2 km), the highway enters a residential neighborhood also passing by some city offices. It crosses a railroad at-grade and passes a manufacturing plant before reaching an intersection with Main Street, LA 182. The two highways head northwest along Main Street for about one-tenth mile (0.16 km) passing some businesses. At the intersection with Lewis Street, in front of the city hall, LA 671 heads to the northeast along this street. It crosses Bayou Teche on a small swing bridge, passes a few more houses and a church, and ends at LA 87.

Major junctions

The entire route is in Jeanerette, Iberia Parish.

mi	km	Destinations	Notes
0.0	0.0	LA 668 (East Admiral Doyle Drive)	
1.3	2.1	LA 182 east (Main Street) / Canal Street – Baldwin, Franklin	Southern end of LA 182 concurrency
1.4	2.3	LA 182 west (Main Street)	Northern end of LA 182 concurrency
1.7	2.7	LA 87 (New Jeanerette Road) / Right Way Road – New Iberia, Adeline	
1.000 mi = 1.609 km; 1.000 km = 0.621 mi: Concurrency terminus

== Louisiana Highway 673 ==
Louisiana Highway 673
- Location: Patoutville
- Length: 0.73 mi (1,170 m)
- Existed: 1955–present

Louisiana Highway 673 (LA 673) is a short 0.73-mile-long (1.17 km) state highway around the unincorporated Iberia Parish community of Patoutville. It begins along Patout Road at the driveway for M.A. Patout & Son, a sugar mill. Patout Road continues due south as a parish road. The highway heads north passing a church and the small residential neighborhood comprising Patoutville. It makes a slight curve to the northwest before ending at a Y-intersection with LA 85. LA 673 is proposed to be transferred to local control under the La DOTD Road Transfer Program.

== Louisiana Highway 674 ==
Louisiana Highway 674
- Location: Jeanerette–New Iberia
- Length: 11.58 mi (18.64 km)

Louisiana Highway 674 (LA 674) runs 11.58 miles (18.64 km) from Jeanerette to New Iberia.

== Louisiana Highway 675 ==
Louisiana Highway 675
- Location: New Iberia
- Length: 4.07 mi (6.55 km)

Louisiana Highway 675 (LA 675) runs 4.07 miles (6.55 km) in New Iberia.

== Louisiana Highway 676 ==
Louisiana Highway 676
- Location: Charlotte–Norbert
- Length: 2.56 mi (4.12 km)

Louisiana Highway 676 (LA 676) runs 2.56 miles (4.12 km) from Charlotte to Norbert.

== Louisiana Highway 677 ==
Louisiana Highway 677
- Location: New Iberia–Morbihan
- Length: 3.86 mi (6.21 km)

Louisiana Highway 677 (LA 677) is a 3.86 mile (6.21 km) state highway in Iberia Parish. The Western end is the Intersection of LA 182E (St Peter Street) It shares Landry Drive as it crosses Main Street (LA 182 W), until it crosses LA 31 (St Martinville Hwy/ Jane Street), where it becomes Sugar Mill Road. The road passes by the now removed sugar mill (Iberia Co-Op), and continues through the Little Woods Neighborhood, and reaches the Eastern end at LA 344 (Morbihan Road, in view of the Cajun Sugar Co-Op.

== Louisiana Highway 678 ==
Louisiana Highway 678
- Location: Cecilia
- Length: 4.70 mi (7.56 km)

Louisiana Highway 678 (LA 678) runs 4.70 miles (7.56 km) in Cecilia.

== Louisiana Highway 679 ==
Louisiana Highway 679
- Location: Coteau Holmes
- Length: 7.20 mi (11.59 km)

Louisiana Highway 679 (LA 679) runs 7.20 miles (11.59 km) in Coteau Holmes.

== Louisiana Highway 680 ==
Louisiana Highway 680
- Location: St. Martin Parish–Iberia Parish
- Length: 4.49 mi (7.23 km)

Louisiana Highway 680 (LA 680) runs 4.49 miles (7.23 km) from St. Martin Parish to Iberia Parish.

== Louisiana Highway 682 ==
Louisiana Highway 682
- Location: Jefferson Island
- Length: 2.20 mi (3.54 km)

Louisiana Highway 682 (LA 682) runs 2.20 miles (3.54 km) in Jefferson Island.

== Louisiana Highway 685 ==
Louisiana Highway 685
- Location: Tigre Lagoon–Erath
- Length: 7.70 mi (12.39 km)

Louisiana Highway 685 (LA 685) runs 7.70 miles (12.39 km) from Tigre Lagoon to Erath.

== Louisiana Highway 686 ==
Louisiana Highway 686
- Location: Cecilia–Arnaudville
- Length: 7.78 mi (12.52 km)

Louisiana Highway 686 (LA 686) runs 7.78 miles (12.52 km) from Cecilia to Arnaudville.

== Louisiana Highway 688 ==
Louisiana Highway 688
- Location: Henry–Boston
- Length: 1.38 mi (2.22 km)
- Existed: 1955–present

Louisiana Highway 688 (LA 688) is an east–west two-lane state highway in rural Vermilion Parish. It is 1.38 miles (2.22 km) long and connects LA 689 at its southern terminus (at LA 688's western terminus near Henry) and LA 331 at its southern terminus (LA 688's eastern terminus near Boston). The entire highway is two lanes wide and travels through farm fields. Near the midpoint of the highway, LA 688 crosses a small waterway and provides access to a boat launch. Under the La DOTD Road Transfer Program as of June 2019, LA 688 is set to be transferred to local jurisdiction.

== Louisiana Highway 689 ==
Louisiana Highway 689
- Location: Henry
- Length: 0.50 mi (800 m)
- Existed: 1955–present

Louisiana Highway 689 (LA 689) is a short 1/2-mile-long (0.80 km) state highway in rural Vermilion Parish near the community of Henry. It travels north–south from the western terminus of LA 688 to LA 330. The southern half of the highway is within farmland while the northern half passes a church, and elementary school, and a few houses. As of June 2019, the highway is proposed to be transferred to local jurisdiction under the La DOTD Road Transfer Program.

== Louisiana Highway 690 ==
Louisiana Highway 690
- Location: Mouton Cove
- Length: 2.62 mi (4.22 km)

Louisiana Highway 690 (LA 690) runs 2.62 miles (4.22 km) in Mouton Cove.

== Louisiana Highway 693 ==
Louisiana Highway 693
- Location: Vermilion Parish
- Length: 3.14 mi (5.05 km)
- Existed: 1955–by 2019

Louisiana Highway 693 (LA 693) ran 3.14 miles (5.05 km) in Vermilion Parish.

== Louisiana Highway 694 ==
Louisiana Highway 694
- Location: Perry
- Length: 3.42 mi (5.50 km)

Louisiana Highway 694 (LA 694) runs 3.42 miles (5.50 km) in Perry.

== Louisiana Highway 695 ==
Louisiana Highway 695
- Location: Nunez
- Length: 3.05 mi (4.91 km)

Louisiana Highway 695 (LA 695) runs 3.05 miles (4.91 km) in Nunez.

== Louisiana Highway 696 ==
Louisiana Highway 696
- Location: Kaplan–Abbeville
- Length: 9.12 mi (14.68 km)
- Existed: 1955–present

Louisiana Highway 696 (LA 696) runs 9.12 miles (14.68 km) in an east–west direction from LA 35 in Kaplan to US 167 north of Abbeville, Vermilion Parish. Along the way, the route intersects LA 343 in an area known as Meaux.

== Louisiana Highway 697 ==
Louisiana Highway 697
- Location: Vermilion Parish
- Length: 3.557 mi (5.724 km)
- Existed: 1955–present

Louisiana Highway 697 (LA 697) runs 3.56 miles (5.73 km) in an east–west direction from LA 343 to US 167 north of Abbeville, Vermilion Parish.

The route formerly extended west across LA 343 then south to LA 696 just west of Meaux, but this mileage was transferred to local control in 2019 as part of La DOTD's Road Transfer Program. As of 2019, the entire route of LA 697 is proposed for deletion as it does not meet a significant interurban travel function as determined by La DOTD's Road Transfer Program.

The entire route is in Vermilion Parish.

mi	km	Destinations	Notes
0.000	0.000	LA 343	Western terminus
3.540– 3.557	5.697– 5.724	US 167 – Abbeville, Lafayette	Eastern terminus
1.000 mi = 1.609 km; 1.000 km = 0.621 mi

== Louisiana Highway 699 ==
Louisiana Highway 699
- Location: Vermilion Parish
- Length: 12.04 mi (19.38 km)
- Existed: 1955–present

Louisiana Highway 699 (LA 699) runs 12.04 miles (19.38 km) in an east–west direction from LA 92 north of Kaplan to US 167 south of Maurice, Vermilion Parish. Along the way, it intersects LA 35, LA 700, and LA 343, with which it has a brief concurrency near Leroy.

The entire highway is in Vermilion Parish.

Location	mi	km	Destinations	Notes
	0.0	0.0	LA 92	Western terminus
	2.9	4.7	LA 35	
Andrew	5.0	8.0	LA 700 – Kaplan, Indian Bayou, Rayne	
Leroy	8.5	13.7	LA 343 south – Meaux, Abbeville	West end of LA 343 concurrency
	9.0	14.5	LA 343 north – Duson	East end of LA 343 concurrency
	12.0	19.3	US 167 – Lafayette, Abbeville	Eastern terminus
1.000 mi = 1.609 km; 1.000 km = 0.621 mi: Concurrency terminus
