= List of state highways in Louisiana (700–749) =

The following is a list of state highways in the U.S. state of Louisiana designated in the 700-749 range.

== Louisiana Highway 700 ==
Louisiana Highway 700
- Location: Kaplan–Lafayette Parish
- Length: 10.69 mi (17.20 km)
- Existed: 1955–present

Louisiana Highway 700 (LA 700) runs 10.69 miles (17.20 km) in a general north–south direction from LA 35 north of Kaplan, Vermilion Parish to LA 342 in southwestern Lafayette Parish. The route travels in a reverse "L" shape along rural section line roads.

LA 700 begins at a junction with LA 35 located about 1 mile (1.6 km) north of Kaplan. After traveling east for 1 mile (1.6 km), the highway turns due north and passes through Andrew, intersecting LA 699. LA 700 has a brief concurrency with LA 92 in an area known as Indian Bayou. It then crosses the waterway of the same name, simultaneously crossing from Vermilion Parish into Lafayette Parish. LA 700 continues a short distance further to an intersection with LA 342 west of Ridge. It is an undivided two-lane highway for its entire length.

Parish	Location	mi	km	Destinations	Notes
Vermilion		0.0	0.0	LA 35 (North Herpin Road) – Kaplan, Rayne	Southern terminus
Vermilion	Andrew	5.0	8.0	LA 699 – Leroy, Abbeville	
Vermilion		7.0	11.3	LA 92 east – Maurice	South end of LA 92 concurrency
Vermilion	Indian Bayou	8.0	12.9	LA 92 west – Crowley	North end of LA 92 concurrency
Lafayette		10.7	17.2	LA 342 (Golden Grain Road) – Rayne, Lafayette	Northern terminus
1.000 mi = 1.609 km; 1.000 km = 0.621 mi

== Louisiana Highway 705 ==
Louisiana Highway 705
- Location: Vermilion Parish
- Length: 1.66 mi (2.67 km)
- Existed: 1955–present

Louisiana Highway 705 (LA 705) runs 1.66 miles (2.67 km) in an east–west direction from the Acadia Parish line to LA 35 west of Indian Bayou, Vermilion Parish. It is an undivided two-lane highway for its entire length.

The entire route is in Vermilion Parish.

mi	km	Destinations	Notes
0.0	0.0	Begin state maintenance	Western terminus
1.6	2.6	LA 35	Eastern terminus
1.000 mi = 1.609 km; 1.000 km = 0.621 mi

== Louisiana Highway 708 ==
Louisiana Highway 708
- Location: Kaplan
- Length: 3.84 mi (6.18 km)

Louisiana Highway 708 (LA 708) runs 3.84 miles (6.18 km) in Kaplan.

== Louisiana Highway 711 ==
Louisiana Highway 711
- Location: Gueydan
- Length: 2.02 mi (3.25 km)

Louisiana Highway 711 (LA 711) runs 2.02 miles (3.25 km) in Gueydan.

== Louisiana Highway 712 ==
Louisiana Highway 712
- Location: Wright
- Length: 2.00 mi (3.22 km)
- Existed: 1955–present

Louisiana Highway 712 (LA 712) runs 2.0 miles (3.2 km) in a north–south direction along Wright Road in northwestern Vermilion Parish.

The route begins at LA 14 in Wright and proceeds due north to a junction with Tom Road. It is an undivided two-lane highway for its entire length.

In the pre-1955 state highway system, LA 712 was designated as State Route C-1574. LA 712 was created with the 1955 Louisiana Highway renumbering, and its route has remained the same to the present day.

The entire highway is in Vermilion Parish.

Location	mi	km	Destinations	Notes
Wright	0.0	0.0	LA 14 (Veterans Memorial Drive) – Lake Arthur, Abbeville	Southern terminus
	2.0	3.2	Tom Road	Northern terminus
1.000 mi = 1.609 km; 1.000 km = 0.621 mi

== Louisiana Highway 713 ==
Louisiana Highway 713
- Location: Gueydan
- Length: 3.55 mi (5.71 km)

Louisiana Highway 713 (LA 713) runs 3.55 miles (5.71 km) from Gueydan.

== Louisiana Highway 714 ==
Louisiana Highway 714
- Location: Riceville
- Length: 2.18 mi (3.51 km)

Louisiana Highway 714 (LA 714) runs 2.18 miles (3.51 km) from Riceville.

== Louisiana Highway 717 ==
Louisiana Highway 717
- Location: Cameron Parish–Vermilion Parish
- Length: 11.84 mi (19.05 km)

Louisiana Highway 717 (LA 717) begins at LA 14 west of Gueydan. It travels west, north, and east before ending at another point on LA 14 south of Lake Arthur.

== Louisiana Highway 719 ==
Louisiana Highway 719
- Location: Duson
- Length: 5.23 mi (8.42 km)
- Existed: 1955–present

Louisiana Highway 719 (LA 719) runs 5.23 miles (8.42 km) in a north–south direction from LA 342 west of Ridge to US 90 in Duson, Lafayette Parish.

Parish	Location	mi	km	Destinations	Notes
Lafayette		0.0	0.0	LA 342	Southern terminus
Lafayette		2.5	4.0	LA 720 east	South end of LA 720 concurrency
Lafayette		3.1	5.0	LA 720 west	North end of LA 720 concurrency
Lafayette–Acadia parish line	Duson	5.23	8.42	US 90	Northern terminus
1.000 mi = 1.609 km; 1.000 km = 0.621 mi

== Louisiana Highway 720 ==
Louisiana Highway 720
- Location: Lafayette Parish
- Length: 5.06 mi (8.14 km)
- Existed: 1955–present

Louisiana Highway 720 (LA 720) runs 5.06 miles (8.14 km) in an east–west direction from the Acadia Parish line to LA 343 south of Duson, Lafayette Parish.

The entire route is in Lafayette Parish.

mi	km	Destinations	Notes
0.0	0.0	Begin state maintenance	Western terminus
2.5	4.0	LA 719 north	West end of LA 719 concurrency
3.0	4.8	LA 719 south	East end of LA 719 concurrency
5.1	8.2	LA 343	Eastern terminus
1.000 mi = 1.609 km; 1.000 km = 0.621 mi

== Louisiana Highway 723 ==
Louisiana Highway 723
- Location: Ossun–Lafayette
- Length: 9.24 mi (14.87 km)

Louisiana Highway 723 (LA 723) runs 9.24 miles (14.87 km) from Ossun to Lafayette.

== Louisiana Highway 724 ==
Louisiana Highway 724
- Location: Lafayette–Ossun
- Length: 11.40 mi (18.35 km)

Louisiana Highway 724 (LA 724) runs 11.40 miles (18.35 km) from Lafayette to Ossun.

== Louisiana Highway 725 ==
Louisiana Highway 725
- Location: Lafayette
- Length: 1.02 mi (1.64 km)

Louisiana Highway 725 (LA 725) runs 1.02 miles (1.64 km) in Lafayette.

== Louisiana Highway 726 ==
Louisiana Highway 726
- Location: Carencro
- Length: 1.13 mi (1.82 km)
- Existed: 1955–present

Louisiana Highway 726 (LA 726) runs 1.13 miles (1.82 km) in an east–west direction from LA 182 to the concurrent I-49 and US 167 in Carencro, Lafayette Parish.

The entire highway is in Carencro, Lafayette Parish.

mi	km	Destinations	Notes
0.0	0.0	LA 182	Western terminus
0.9	1.4	I-49 / US 167 – Lafayette, Opelousas	Exit 4 on I-49
1.1	1.8	End state maintenance	Eastern terminus
1.000 mi = 1.609 km; 1.000 km = 0.621 mi

== Louisiana Highway 728 ==
Louisiana Highway 728
- Location: Walroy
- Length: 0.66 mi (1,060 m)

Louisiana Highway 728 (LA 728) is a collection of two state highways in Walroy south of Lafayette in Lafayette Parish. Both highways are part of Hugh Wallis Road and generally run parallel to US 90 and a BNSF railroad.

- LA 728-2 (0.37 miles or 0.60 kilometres) begins at a curve tangent and heads north-northwest past a hotel and a few homes. The highway ends at LA 729 (General Mouton Avenue).
- LA 728-3 (0.29 miles or 0.47 kilometres) begins at a superstreet intersection with US 90 where it travels west to cross the railroad, then turns to the north-northwest along Hugh Wallis Road. It ends at a right in/right out intersection with Kaliste Saloom Road.

The two current sections of road were previously united as LA 728-2. The highway had previously crossed Kaliste Saloom Road before a portion of Hugh Wallis Road to the north was realigned and transferred out of state jurisdiction. The construction that created the two separate sections occurred between 2015 and 2016.

== Louisiana Highway 729 ==
Louisiana Highway 729
- Location: Lafayette
- Length: 0.73 mi (1,170 m)
- Existed: 1955–present

Louisiana Highway 729 (LA 729) runs 0.73 miles (1.17 km) in an east–west direction along General Mouton Avenue from US 90 Business to mainline US 90 in Lafayette, Lafayette Parish. Under the proposed La DOTD plan to eliminate state-maintained roadways throughout the state, all of LA 729 is proposed to be transferred to local jurisdiction.

One unsigned 0.09-mile-long (0.14 km) spur route, LA 729 Spur, exits in Lafayette. It essentially acts as a private driveway for a nearby car dealership and has gates and private signage though per recent La DOTD documents, the road is still state-maintained.

Major junctions

The entire highway is in Lafayette, Lafayette Parish.

mi	km	Destinations	Notes
0.0	0.0	US 90 Bus. (East Pinhook Road)	Western terminus
0.5	0.80	LA 728-2 (Hugh Wallis Road)	Northern terminus of LA 728-2
0.6	0.97	LA 729 Spur (Plantation Road)	Northern terminus of LA 729 Spur
0.7	1.1	US 90	Eastern terminus
1.000 mi = 1.609 km; 1.000 km = 0.621 mi

== Louisiana Highway 731 ==
Louisiana Highway 731
- Location: Broussard
- Length: 1.145 mi (1.843 km)
- Existed: 1955–2021

Louisiana Highway 731 (LA 731) ran 1.145 miles (1.843 km) in a northwest to southeast direction along 2nd Street from US 90 to LA 182-2 in Broussard, Lafayette Parish. It was decommissioned and transferred to local control in 2021.

Major junctions

The entire highway was in Broussard, Lafayette Parish.

mi	km	Destinations	Notes
0.000	0.000	Kol Drive to US 90	Western terminus
0.542	0.872	LA 731 Spur (North Morgan Avenue)	Northern terminus of LA 731 Spur
1.145	1.843	LA 182-2 (East Main Street)	Eastern terminus
1.000 mi = 1.609 km; 1.000 km = 0.621 mi

Louisiana Highway 731 Spur
- Location: Broussard
- Length: 0.272 mi (438 m)
- Existed: 1955–2021

=== Louisiana Highway 731 Spur ===
One 0.272-mile-long (0.438 km) spur route, LA 731 Spur, existed along North Morgan Avenue in Broussard. It traveled from Main Street (a former section of LA 182) to 2nd Street (LA 731). It was also decommissioned and transferred to local control in 2021.

Major junctions

The entire highway was in Broussard, Lafayette Parish.

mi	km	Destinations	Notes
0.000	0.000	LA 731 (2nd Street)	Northern terminus
0.272	0.438	Main Street	Southern terminus; former LA 182
1.000 mi = 1.609 km; 1.000 km = 0.621 mi

== Louisiana Highway 733 ==
Louisiana Highway 733
- Location: Milton–Lafayette
- Length: 4.41 mi (7.10 km)

Louisiana Highway 733 (LA 733) runs 4.41 miles (7.10 km) from Milton to Lafayette.

== Louisiana Highway 734 ==
Louisiana Highway 734
- Location: Youngsville
- Length: 1.01 mi (1.63 km)
- Existed: 1955–2013

Louisiana Highway 734 (LA 734) was a 1.01-mile (1.63 km) long state highway which ran between LA 339, northeast to LA 89 (First Street) in Youngsville. The highway was retired in 2013 and handed over to local jurisdictions for maintenance.

== Louisiana Highway 737 ==
Louisiana Highway 737
- Location: Coteau Rodaire–Portage
- Length: 3.00 mi (4.83 km)

Louisiana Highway 737 (LA 737) runs 3.00 miles (4.83 km) from Coteau Rodaire to Portage.

== Louisiana Highway 740 ==
Louisiana Highway 740
- Location: Arnaudville
- Length: 0.43 mi (690 m)
- Existed: 1955–present

Louisiana Highway 740 (LA 740) runs 0.43 miles (0.69 km) in a north–south direction from LA 347 in Arnaudville, St. Landry Parish to the northern town limits.

The entire highway is in Arnaudville, St. Landry Parish.

mi	km	Destinations	Notes
0.0	0.0	LA 347 (Main Street, Guidroz Street)	Southern terminus
0.4	0.64	End state maintenance	Northern terminus
1.000 mi = 1.609 km; 1.000 km = 0.621 mi

== Louisiana Highway 741 ==
Louisiana Highway 741
- Location: Leonville–Port Barre
- Length: 6.68 mi (10.75 km)

Louisiana Highway 741 (LA 741) runs 6.68 miles (10.75 km) from Leonville to Port Barre.

== Louisiana Highway 742 ==
Louisiana Highway 742
- Location: Opelousas–Port Barre
- Length: 5.07 mi (8.16 km)

Louisiana Highway 742 (LA 742) runs 5.07 miles (8.16 km) from Opelousas to Port Barre.

== Louisiana Highway 743 ==
Louisiana Highway 743
- Location: Gibbs–Washington
- Length: 8.42 mi (13.55 km)

Louisiana Highway 743 (LA 743) runs 8.42 miles (13.55 km) from Gibbs to Washington.

== Louisiana Highway 744 ==
Louisiana Highway 744
- Location: St. Landry Parish
- Length: 0.75 mi (1,210 m)
- Existed: 1955–present

Louisiana Highway 744 (LA 744) runs 0.75 miles (1.21 km) in an east–west direction from the junction of I-49 and US 167 to LA 743 southeast of Washington, St. Landry Parish.

The entire route is in St. Landry Parish.

mi	km	Destinations	Notes
0.0	0.0	I-49 / US 167 – Opelousas, Alexandria	Western terminus; exit 23 on I-49
0.8	1.3	LA 743	Eastern terminus
1.000 mi = 1.609 km; 1.000 km = 0.621 mi

== Louisiana Highway 745 ==
Louisiana Highway 745
- Location: Washington–Beggs
- Length: 3.32 mi (5.34 km)

Louisiana Highway 745 (LA 745) runs 3.32 miles (5.34 km) from Washington to Beggs.

== Louisiana Highway 746 ==
Louisiana Highway 746
- Location: St. Landry Parish
- Length: 1.59 mi (2.56 km)
- Existed: 1955–present

Louisiana Highway 746 (LA 746) runs 1.59 miles (2.56 km) in an east–west direction from a dead end at Camp Thistlethwaite to LA 745 north of Washington, St. Landry Parish.

The entire route is in St. Landry Parish.

mi	km	Destinations	Notes
0.0	0.0	Dead end at Camp Thistlethwaite	Western terminus
1.6	2.6	LA 745	Eastern terminus
1.000 mi = 1.609 km; 1.000 km = 0.621 mi

== Louisiana Highway 748 ==
Louisiana Highway 748
- Location: Ville Platte–Grand Prairie
- Length: 5.77 mi (9.29 km)

Louisiana Highway 748 (LA 748) runs 5.77 miles (9.29 km) from Ville Platte to Grand Prairie.

== Louisiana Highway 749 ==
Louisiana Highway 749
- Location: Opelousas
- Length: 4.27 mi (6.87 km)

Louisiana Highway 749 (LA 749) runs 4.27 miles (6.87 km) in Opelousas.
