= North Vermilion High School =

Public high school in Louisiana

Location
- 11609 Highway 699; Maurice, Vermilion Parish, Louisiana 70555; United States; 30.0795°N 92.1684°W

Information
- Type: Public high school
- Established: 1980
- School district: Vermilion Parish School Board
- Principal: Casey Meador
- Staff: 36.53 (FTE)
- Enrollment: 790 (2024-25)
- Student to teacher ratio: 21.63
- Colors: Red, white and navy
- Nickname: Patriots

North Vermilion High School is a public secondary school in Maurice, Louisiana. The school serves the communities of Maurice, Meaux, Indian Bayou, and Leroy.

== History ==
Early in the settlement of the northern reaches of Vermilion Parish, education was often held in small, irregular, one-room schoolhouses on privately owned land. Students in the vicinity of the future community of Maurice first began attending school at a building on the property of Maurice Villien, later to be the namesake of the community, which also doubled as a church called La Chapelle a Maurice. In 1885, the first school was built Broussard Cove on land donated by Joseph Clark and, in July 1899, the school moved to a site donated by Maurice Villien at modern-day Maurice Avenue and Indian Bayou Road.

This first school in the present community of Maurice burned in 1914 and a new, modern public elementary and high school was built in 1926. In 1928, two students, Edes Clark and Beulah McDonald, made up the Maurice school's first graduating class with a ceremony held on the front porch of the elementary school.

On November 7, 1943, a possible F3 tornado touched down in Vermilion Parish killing four people (one victim died on Nov. 18) and causing severe damage at the Maurice school. Parish school superintendent J.H. Williams told the local newspaper that the damage to the school was so considerable that the school would need to close for several days for repairs.

In 1962, a petition led by Maurice area resident Doyce Broussard proposed consolidating the small, rural schools at Maurice, Meaux, and Indian Bayou into one centralized school near the community of Leroy. The proposal cited concerns about the smaller schools being closed and students being sent to already overcrowded schools in the larger towns of Abbeville and Kaplan. However, in April 1963, the Vermilion Parish School Board voted 9-4 to table the proposal at a heated board meeting in which proponents of consolidation cited the state's recommendation of closing small, rural schools and opponents citing raised taxes.

By August 1977, however, the inevitable seemed to be at hand. On August 4, 1977 the School Board took several actions toward creating a combined school for the communities of Maurice, Meaux, and Indian Bayou. A special election was announced for the following month to create a new school bond district in the area and to eliminate the separate tax district in Maurice. On September 17, 1977, voters in Maurice and Meaux overwhelmingly approved of the school financing plan by a 733-202 vote.

The Vermilion Parish School Board in September 1978, chose the name "North Vermilion High School" over the Maurice-Meaux Building Committee's original first choice of "Central High School," as the board felt it was too generic in identifying the school's location.

== Academics ==
At North Vermilion High School, 53% of students scored at or above the proficient level for math, which is better than both the state and district average, and 65% scored at or above that level for reading.

== Demographics ==
The school’s minority student enrollment is 15.7%. The student population is made up of 50% female students and 50% male students. The school enrolls 19% economically disadvantaged students.

== Athletics ==
The North Vermilion Patriots compete in Class 4A of the Louisiana High School Athletics Association.
