= Sam H. Theriot =

American politician (born 1954)

Samuel Houston Theriot

Member of the Louisiana House of Representatives from the 47th district
- In office 1979–1995
- Preceded by: Cecil Picard
- Succeeded by: Mickey Frith

Clerk of Court of Vermilion Parish
- In office 1996–2000
- Preceded by: Russell Gaspard
- Succeeded by: Todd A. Dore

Personal details
- Born: Samuel Houston Theriot; 1954 (age 71–72) Abbeville, Louisiana, U.S.
- Party: Democratic
- Children: 2
- Education: University of Louisiana at Lafayette (BA, MA); Louisiana State University (PhD)

Samuel Houston Theriot (/ˈtɛrioʊ/; born August 1954) is an American politician who served as a member of the Louisiana House of Representatives for Abbeville in Vermilion Parish in southwestern Louisiana. He represented District 47 in the House from 1979 until 1996.

== Early life and education ==
Theriot was born one of three children of Roy R. Theriot, the mayor of Abbeville from 1956 to 1960 and later Louisiana state comptroller.

Theriot graduated in 1972 from Abbeville High School and received a bachelor's degree from the University of Louisiana at Lafayette in 1976. In 1986, he earned a teacher certification and a master's degree in educational administration. In 2009, Theriot received a Ph.D. in educational administration from Louisiana State University in Baton Rouge; his thesis is entitled He taught school for several years in Vermillion Parish. He served briefly on the Abbeville City Council in 1978.

In 1991, Theriot co-sponsored with State Senator Allen Bares of Lafayette a measure which would have outlawed most abortions in Louisiana, including impregnations through incest. The legislature approved the bill, but it was vetoed by Governor Buddy Roemer on the grounds that it went beyond the scope of the 1973 United States Supreme Court decision Roe v. Wade. Such feminist groups such as the National Organization for Women, subsequently headed by the Louisiana native Kim Gandy, successfully targeted Bares and a pro-life House member, Democrat Carl Newton Gunter Jr., of Rapides Parish, for defeat. Theriot, however, survived the 1991 election without opposition In the 1987 primary he had defeated fellow Democrat Warren J. Simon by a two-to-one margin.

In 1995, Theriot did not seek re-election to the House in the nonpartisan blanket primary;instead he ran successfully for Vermilion Parish clerk of court. with 57 percent of the vote over two opponents, one being the Republican Todd A. Dore, a businessman who owns a title company and is engaged in the petroleum industry. In the 1999 primary, Theriot trailed with 23.8 percent of the ballots cast and decided not to contest the general election with Todd Dore, this time the leading candidate in the field, who finished with 43 percent of the vote. Theriot's former wife, Cynthia "Cindy" Theriot, a Democrat, also ran for clerk and polled 13.4 percent, more than half of his vote total.

In the legislature, Theriot was a strong advocate of parish fairs and festivals, an issue also important to his father. In 1998, the Louisiana Fair/Festival Association inducted him into its hall of fame. He received high rankings as a legislator from the teacher lobbying organizations.

As of 2009, Theriot has worked a social studies teacher at North Vermilion High School in Maurice, Louisiana.

== Personal life ==
A Roman Catholic, Theriot is a member of the men's organization the Knights of Columbus. Theriot resides in Lafayette, Louisiana, with his second wife, Mary. He has two children (Elizabeth Theriot-Guidry and Jacob Roy Theriot) and three grandchildren.

Preceded by Ceccil Piccard	Louisiana State Representative for District 47 (Vermilion Parish); 1979–1996	Succeeded by Mickey Frith
Preceded by Russell Gaspard	Clerk of Court of Vermilion Parish; 1996–2004	Succeeded by Todd A. Dore
