= Abbeville High School =

Abbeville High School may refer to:

- Abbeville High School (Alabama), Abbeville, Alabama, US
- Abbeville High School (Louisiana); see Vermilion Parish School Board
- Abbeville High School (South Carolina), Abbeville, South Carolina, US
