= VPSB =

VPSB may refer to:

- Vermilion Parish School Board
- Vernon Parish School Board
