= Delcambre, Louisiana =

- Town
- Town of Delcambre
- Location of Delcambre in Vermilion and Iberia parishes, Louisiana

- Location of Louisiana in the United States
- Coordinates: 29°57′09″N 91°59′57″W
- Country: United States
- State: Louisiana
- Parishes: Iberia and Vermilion

Area
  - Total: 1.17 sq mi (3.03 km^{2})
  - Land: 1.17 sq mi (3.03 km^{2})
  - Water: 0 sq mi (0.00 km^{2})
- Elevation: 7 ft (2.1 m)

Population (2020)
  - Total: 1,793
  - Density: 1,533.1/sq mi (591.94/km^{2})
- Time zone: UTC-6 (CST)
  - Summer (DST): UTC-5 (CDT)
- ZIP code: 70528
- Area code: 337
- FIPS code: 22-20155
- GNIS feature ID: 2406370
- Website: www.townofdelcambre.net

Delcambre is a town in Iberia and Vermilion parishes in the U.S. state of Louisiana, located 9 miles (14 km) east of Abbeville on Louisiana Highway 14 in the Cajun Heartland of Acadiana. Bayou Carlin, also known as the Delcambre Canal, passes through the town and is home for much of the local fishing industry. As of the 2020 census, Delcambre had a population of 1,793.

Delcambre is part of the Lafayette, Louisiana metropolitan statistical area.

== History ==
When the King of Spain made Louisiana a gift to his brother-in-law, the King of France, settlers of French heritage began to occupy the area. Brothers Charles and Louis Delcambre came from Belgium to settle in the area between the two towns now known as Delcambre and New Iberia. Louis' son, Poufette Delcambre, settled further to the west in what is now known as Pouffette Station. Pouffette's son, Desire Delcambre, was the founder of the town of Delcambre. The first post office was opened on May 17, 1877, and the town was incorporated on November 27, 1907.

In 2005, much of the town was flooded by the storm surge forced inland by Hurricane Rita. Water in many parts of town was up to 6 feet (1.8 m) deep. The mayor of Delcambre was quoted as saying that only 25 of 900 homes in the town were not flooded.

The Delcambre town council and Mayor Carrol Brousard passed an ordinance in June 2007 making sagging illegal, expanding an existing state indecent exposure law to add underwear to the list of what cannot be exposed.

== Geography ==
Delcambre is located on the border of Vermilion and Iberia parishes. Louisiana Highway 14 passes through the north side of the town, leading east 12 miles (19 km) to New Iberia and west 9 miles (14 km) to Abbeville. Erath is 3 miles (5 km) west on Highway 14. Lake Peigneur, at the head of the Delcambre Canal, is 1 mile (1.6 km) to the north.

According to the United States Census Bureau, the town has a total area of 1.2 square miles (3.0 km^{2}), all of it recorded as land.

== Demographics ==
Historical population
Census	Pop.	Note	%±
1910	308		—
1920	443		43.8%
1930	640		44.5%
1940	1,255		96.1%
1950	1,463		16.6%
1960	1,857		26.9%
1970	1,975		6.4%
1980	2,216		12.2%
1990	1,978		−10.7%
2000	2,168		9.6%
2010	1,866		−13.9%
2020	1,793		−3.9%
2025 (est.)	1,766	▼	−1.5%
U.S. Decennial Census

Historically, the area that became known as Delcambre was first settled by Acadians who were expelled from Nova Scotia in the mid-18th century.

As of 2006, 74.2% of the town population spoke English, 24.2% French (including Cajun), and 1.5% Spanish.

Delcambre racial composition
Race	Number	Percentage
White (non-Hispanic)	1,327	74.01%
Black or African American (non-Hispanic)	248	13.83%
Native American	18	1.0%
Asian	1	0.06%
Other/Mixed	97	5.41%
Hispanic or Latino	102	5.69%

As of the 2020 United States census, there were 1,793 people, 748 households, and 500 families residing in the town. As of the census of 2000, there were 2,168 people, 826 households, and 593 families residing in the town. The population density was 2,610.9 inhabitants per square mile (1,008.1/km^{2}). There were 903 housing units at an average density of 1,087.5 units per square mile (419.9 units/km^{2}). The racial makeup of the town was 82.70% White, 14.44% African American, 0.88% Native American, 0.51% Asian, 0.05% Pacific Islander, 0.23% from other races, and 1.20% from two or more races. Hispanic or Latino of any race were 1.89% of the population.

There were 826 households, out of which 35.6% had children under the age of 18 living with them, 51.0% were married couples living together, 16.3% had a female householder with no husband present, and 28.1% were non-families. 24.2% of all households were made up of individuals, and 12.2% had someone living alone who was 65 years of age or older. The average household size was 2.62 and the average family size was 3.10.

In the town, the population was spread out, with 27.7% under the age of 18, 10.9% from 18 to 24, 27.4% from 25 to 44, 21.4% from 45 to 64, and 12.6% who were 65 years of age or older. The median age was 33 years. For every 100 females, there were 95.0 males. For every 100 females age 18 and over, there were 89.9 males.

The median income for a household in the town was $27,500, and the median income for a family was $34,643. Males had a median income of $27,750 versus $17,438 for females. The per capita income for the town was $13,245. About 17.4% of families and 20.2% of the population were below the poverty line, including 25.1% of those under age 18 and 19.2% of those age 65 or over.

== Education ==
Residents of Delcambre in both Vermilion and Iberia parishes are zoned to the Iberia Parish School System.

All areas of Iberia Parish are officially in the Iberia Parish school district, while all areas in Vermilion Parish are officially in the Vermilion Parish School Board. However Iberia Parish School District operates all public schools in Delcambre, and these schools are on the Vermilion Parish side of Delcambre. The Vermilion Parish district pays money to the Iberia parish district to educate Delcambre students in Vermilion Parish. In 2000 the Iberia Parish district signed an inter-district agreement with the Vermilion Parish district over those payments. Another such agreement was signed in 2022.

Residents in Delcambre are zoned to Delcambre Elementary School and Delcambre High School.
