= St. Mary Congregational Church =

Historic church in Louisiana, United States

- U.S. National Register of Historic Places
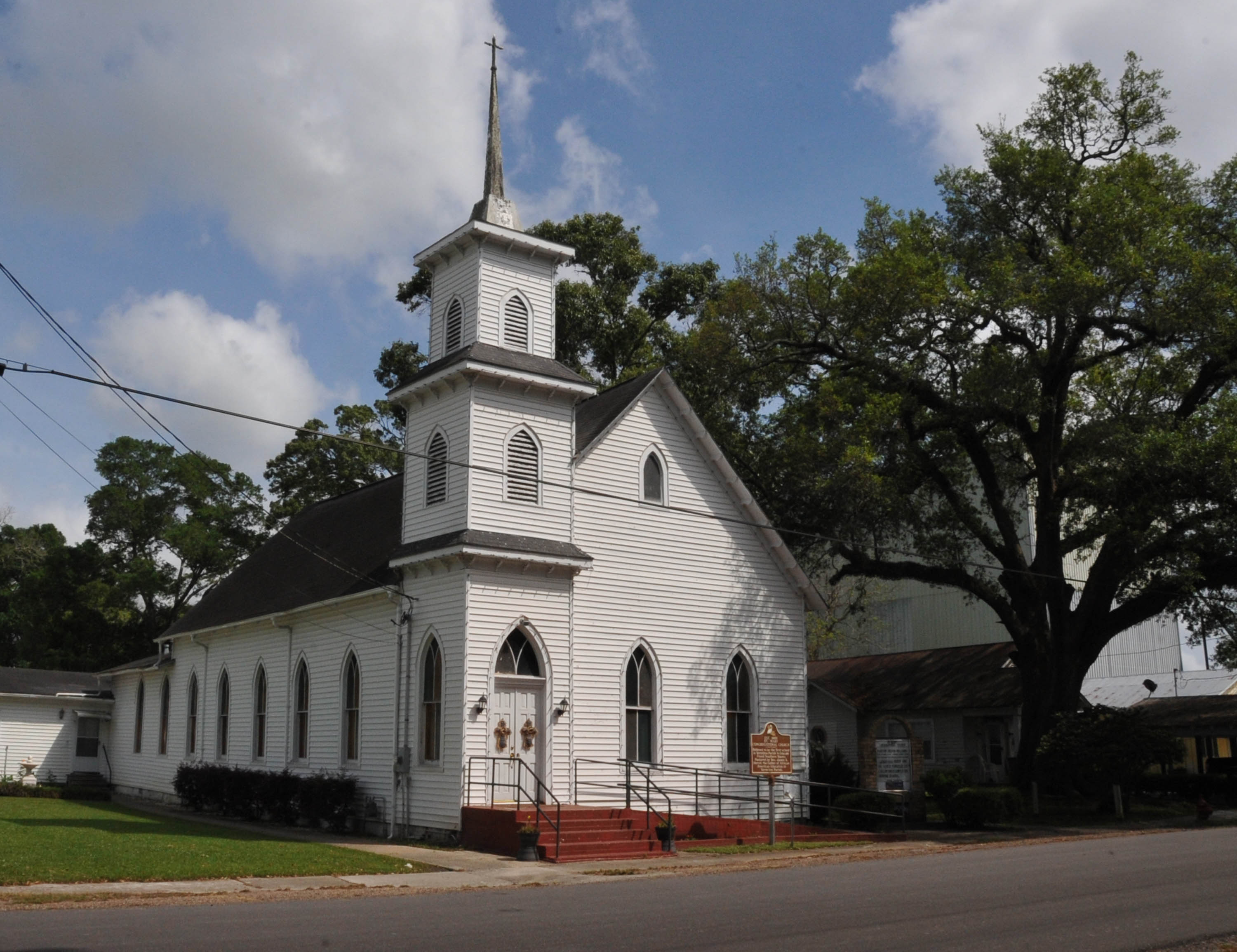

- Location within Louisiana Location within the United States
- Location: 213 S. Louisiana Ave., Abbeville, Louisiana
- Coordinates: 29°58′17″N 92°8′3″W
- Area: less than one acre
- Built: 1905
- Architectural style: Gothic Revival
- NRHP reference No.: 99000983
- Added to NRHP: August 12, 1999

St. Mary Congregational Church in Abbeville, Louisiana is the oldest incorporated, predominantly African-American church in Vermilion Parish. Its historic Gothic Revival style church at 213 S. Louisiana Avenue, constructed in 1905 to replace a previous building, was added to the National Register of Historic Places in 1999.

American Missionary Association records show the congregation dates to at least 1877.

The structure is a three-bay, gable-fronted church with a prominent corner tower. The tower is three-stage and square.

Rev. Kevin M. A. Williams, Sr. is the pastor.
