= Vermilion Parish School Board =

School district in Louisiana, United States

Coordinates: 29.9716°N 92.1379°W

Vermilion Parish School Board (VPSB) is a school district headquartered in Abbeville, Louisiana, United States. It was established in 1876.

The district serves Vermilion Parish, with its official territory matching parish boundaries, and operates most public schools there. However, public schools serving Delcambre are located in Vermilion Parish but are operated by the Iberia Parish School System. The Vermilion Parish district pays money to the Iberia parish district to educate Delcambre students in Vermilion Parish. In 2000 the Iberia Parish district signed an inter-district agreement with the Vermilion Parish district over those payments. Another such agreement was signed in 2022.

Vermilion Parish is headed by Superintendent Jerome Puyau. Puyau's leadership style has been called intimidating and in January 2018 a teacher was handcuffed during a public discussion of his pay raise.

== Leadership ==
The Superintendent of Vermilion Parish, Jerome Puyau, worked in Vermilion Parish before becoming the district's supervisor of maintenance in August 2006. He was named superintendent-elect in July 2012, and took over the position permanently in January 2013. His January 2017 contract renewal was controversial, as board members called his style intimidating and found that he lacked strategic vision.

On January 8, 2018, teacher Deyshia Hargrave was arrested for questioning the school board about its decision to increase Payau's salary but keep teacher salaries unchanged.

Hargrave was asked by a marshal to leave the room after she questioned the Vermilion Parish School Board on their decision to increase the salary of superintendent Jerome Puyau but keep teacher salaries stagnant. After she walked out into the hallway, the marshal handcuffed and arrested her. The city's prosecutor and the board declined to press charges. Board president Anthony Fontana described the incident as a "set up" and blamed "the poor little woman" for the incident, saying, "She could have walked out and nothing would have happened." As a result, Fontana resigned on January 19, 2018.

== Discipline ==
There is a mandatory Discipline Plan for grades 4 through 12. Corporal punishment may be administered by teachers and administrators. An adult witness must be present. There is a maximum of five strokes per punishment, which must be delivered to the student's posterior. The paddle used is of wood, 14 to 15 inches long, 6 inches wide and a half-inch thick. Other discipline management techniques include suspension (in or out of school) and expulsion. Also, students aged 15 through 18 who are persistently absent from or tardy to school may have their driving privileges revoked by the State of Louisiana.

=== School uniforms ===
The district requires all students to wear school uniforms.

== Schools ==
=== 6-12 schools ===
- Gueydan High School (Gueydan)

=== 9-12 schools ===
- Abbeville High School (Abbeville)
- Erath High School (Erath)
- Kaplan High School (Kaplan)
- North Vermilion High School (Unincorporated area)

=== PK-8 schools ===
- Forked Island - East Broussard Elementary School (Unincorporated area)
- Indian Bayou Elementary School (Unincorporated area)

=== 5-8 schools ===
- Erath Middle School (Erath)
- Rene A. Rost Middle School (Kaplan)

Rene A. Rost Middle School is a public school that has practiced sex segregation which ACLU alleges is a violation of Title IX.

=== 6-8 schools ===
- J. H. Williams Middle School (Abbeville)l
- North Vermilion Middle School Maurice

=== PK-5 schools ===
- Dozier Elementary School (Erath)
- Cecil Picard Elementary School at Maurice (Maurice)
- Eaton Park Elementary School (Abbeville)
- James A. Herod Elementary School (Abbeville) (formerly East Abbeville Elementary School)
- Jesse Owens Elementary School (Gueydan)
- Leblanc Elementary (Abbeville)
- Meaux Elementary School (Meaux)
- Seventh Ward Elementary School (Unincorporated area)

=== PK-4 schools ===
- Kaplan Elementary School (Kaplan)
