= Golden J. Zenon Jr. =

American architect (1929–2006)

Golden Joseph Zenon Jr.
- Born: March 13, 1929; Abbeville, Louisiana, U.S.
- Died: December 27, 2006 (aged 77); Omaha, Nebraska, U.S.
- Burial place: Calvary Cemetery, Omaha, Nebraska, U.S.
- Other names: Golden Joseph Zenon, Golden J. Zenon, G.J. Zenon
- Education: University of Nebraska–Lincoln
- Occupation: Architect
- Spouse: Willie Mae Robinson

Golden Joseph Zenon Jr., FAIA (March 13, 1929 – December 27, 2006), was an American architect. He was active in Nebraska and was a principal of Zenon–Beringer & Associates (ZBA), and later Zenon Beringer Mabrey Partners.

== Early life and education ==
Golden J. Zenon Jr. was born on March 13, 1929, in Abbeville, Vermilion Parish, Louisiana, to an African American family. His father was a cotton sharecropper. He attended a segregated elementary school but around age 10 he had to drop out due to the outbreak of World War II, and because his dad needed help on the farm after his two older brothers were serving in the U.S. military. Three years later, Zenon was sent to live with his aunt in Houston, Texas, where he attended Jack Yates High School (now Yates High School) and graduated in 1949. While attending high school he took mechanical drawing classes.

He initially studied at Southern University (now Southern University and A&M College) in Louisiana, in the vocational and Industrial education department but he wasn't happy with the coursework. In 1955, Zenon graduated in architecture from University of Nebraska–Lincoln.

In 1955, Zenon won the Lincoln Home Builders Association's design contest for students at the University of Nebraska, and his three bedroom home design was constructed in Park Manor in Lincoln, Nebraska.

== Career ==
After he graduated he worked as a designer at Leo A. Daly Co., and worked as an architect with Dana Larson Roubal and Associates. In 1966, the Swanson Branch Library in Omaha was designed by the Leo A. Daly staff architects Zenon and William Larson. In 1969, Zenon was promoted to design director at Dana Larson Roubal and Associates.

In 1973, Zenon designed the Willis A. and Janet S. Strauss Performing Arts Center for the University of Nebraska Omaha (UNO) School of Music.

He established Zenon Beringer & Associates (ZBA) with architect David Beringer in 1975. He served as the first president of the architecture program's alumni association for the University of Nebraska in 1982. In 1986, he was named a Fellow of the American Institute of Architects.

Zenon retired in the mid-1990s.

He died on December 27, 2006, from complications related to Parkinson's disease. Zenon was married to Willie Mae (née Robinson) for more than 50 years. He is buried at Calvary Cemetery in Omaha.

== Works ==
- 1965, Science building, Creighton University, Omaha, Nebraska
- 1966, Swanson Branch Library, Omaha Public Library, Omaha, Nebraska (designed with Leo A. Daly Co.)
- 1973, Willis A. and Janet S. Strauss Performing Arts Center for the School of Music, University of Nebraska Omaha (UNO), Omaha, Nebraska

== See also ==
- African-American architects
