= Nunez, Louisiana =

Unincorporated community in Louisiana, U.S.

Coordinates: 29°59′29″N 92°13′43″W

Nunez is an unincorporated community in Vermilion Parish, Louisiana, United States.
