= Bobby Duhon =

American football player (born 1946)

No. 28
- Position: Running back

Personal information
- Born: September 24, 1946 (age 80); Abbeville, Louisiana, U.S.
- Listed height: 6 ft 0 in (1.83 m)
- Listed weight: 195 lb (88 kg)

Career information
- High school: Abbeville
- College: Tulane
- NFL draft: 1968: 3rd round, 70th overall pick

Career history
- New York Giants (1968–1972)

Career NFL statistics
- Rushing yards: 840
- Rushing average: 3.8
- Receptions: 68
- Receiving yards: 717
- Total touchdowns: 6
- Stats at Pro Football Reference

Robert Joseph Duhon Jr. (born September 24, 1946) is an American former professional football player who played running back for four seasons for the New York Giants. Duhon played college football as a left-handed quarterback, and college baseball at Tulane University. Initially, seeing no opportunity for him to compete with star signing Fran Tarkenton, the Giants wanted to convert the mobile Duhon to a safety, but ultimately decided to convert him to running back.
