= St. Mary Magdalen Church (Abbeville) =

Historic church in Louisiana, United States

- St. Mary Magdalen Church, Rectory, and Cemetery
- U.S. National Register of Historic Places
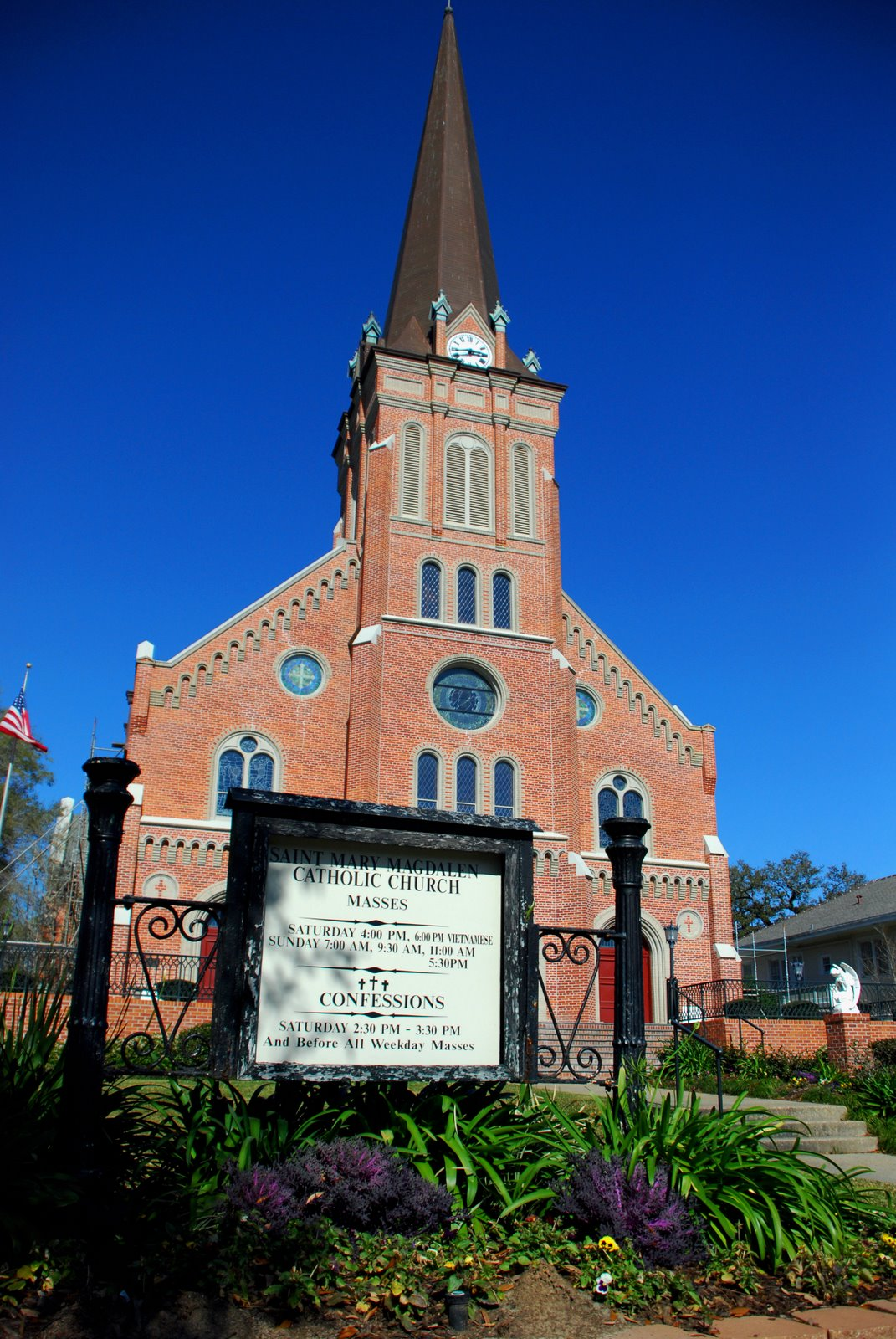

- Location within Louisiana Location within the United States
- Location: 300 Pere Megret St., Abbeville, Louisiana
- Coordinates: 29°58′28″N 92°8′15″W
- Area: 3 acres (1.2 ha)
- Built: 1911
- Built by: Eugene Guillot
- Architectural style: Gothic, Romanesque Revival, American Foursquare
- NRHP reference No.: 88000116
- Added to NRHP: February 11, 1988

St. Mary Magdalen Church is a historic Roman Catholic church at in Abbeville, Louisiana. In 1988 the church, along with the associated rectory and cemetery, was listed on the National Register of Historic Places.

The cemetery was founded c. 1844, the present church was built in 1911; the American Foursquare-style rectory was built in 1921. The property added to the National Register in 1988.

The church is a red brick Gothic-style cruciform basilica with buff-colored brick accents. It has Romanesque Revival details. It has somewhat projecting buttresses reinforcing its outer walls.

== History ==
St. Mary Magdalen Parish was established in 1842 by Pere Antoine Desire Megret. The first church, the remodeled home of Joseph LeBlanc, was built and dedicated in the spring of 1844. From the beginning it was placed under the invocation of Saint Mary Magdalen, a favorite saint among the descendants of the Acadian exiles all through South Louisiana. The name was always retained, except for a short time during Father Laforest's administration, when after the 1907 fire, the church was temporarily called Saint Ann's, at least in the reports.

In September 1847, Reverend Nicholas Francais was given charge of Saint Mary Magdalen Church, but Pere Megret continued to look after the Catholics of Abbeville and vicinity. Father Francais served there until after September 1850.

In 1851, Archbishop Blanc made Vermilion Parish an independent parochial jurisdiction, with Saint Mary Magdalen's Church as the parish church, and Reverend Hubert Thirion, a young French priest, the first resident pastor. He was joined by Reverend Francis Mittlebronn, a newly ordained priest, who became the first parish assistant. Father Thirion and Father Mittlebronn remained until sometime after October 12, 1852.

The church was without a pastor for a time, then in February 1853, Reverend J. Regale was sent to take charge of the parish. Father Regale left Abbeville sometime in 1853, and in either November or December that year Abbeville was given its new pastor, Reverend Stephen (Etienne) Joseph Foltier, a French priest.

In February 1854, a fire at the rectory destroyed the church records. The current parish records begin on February 20, 1854. There was an attempt to reconstruct the baptism records by having the parishioners come in to report the baptism of their children. The marriage records were completely lost.

Father Foltier left in September 1856 and Reverend Jean Arthur Poyet was his successor. Father Poyet was an energetic priest, and he visited every corner of the parish from Delcambre out to Gueydan and Cossinade, and down to the swamps on the Gulf shore. With genuine regret, the parishioners of Saint Mary Magdalen bade farewell to Father Poyet in January 1866.

The new pastor was Reverend Theodore Lamy, a French priest. In December 1868, Father Lamy welcomed a young French priest named Alexandre Mehault, who came to serve as assistant, and eventually became one of the pastors of Saint Mary Magdalen Church.

Father Mehault became pastor in May 1870. During his pastorate, a new rectory was built, a new bell was put in the church, and many improvements were made to the church. He made periodic visits to his home in France and, while there, obtained vestments, ornaments, sacred vessels, statues and other religious ornaments for Saint Mary Magdalen's church. The parish church became a place of beauty, and ceremonies of the church were conducted with brilliance and solemnity in accord with their high purpose of glorifying Almighty God. New stained-glass windows and a beautiful set of hand-painted Stations of the Cross on canvas were obtained. Many of these articles were donated by people of Vermilion Parish. Father Mehault also brought Catholic education to the parish, persuading the Sisters of Mount Carmel at New Orleans to staff a school in Abbeville.

It soon became apparent that the frame structure on the site of Joseph LeBlanc's home was far too small. Everyone agreed that a new and larger church was needed. On May 28, 1884, the new Saint Mary Magdalen Church was solemnly blessed.

In May 1896, St. Mary Magdalen's Parish was legally incorporated as "The Congregation of St. Mary Magdalen Roman Catholic Church" and all of the parochial property was formally transferred by the archdiocese to the new parish corporation.

Father Mehault left Abbeville in July 1899. He was succeeded by Reverend Fabian Laforest, a native of Canada. Father Laforest was a priest of many attainments, artistic, deeply pious, scholarly and a capable administrator. In 1904, Father Laforest installed a new organ in the church and enlarged the rectory. In 1905 he arranged for a new cemetery, and installed new pews in the church.

On March 22, 1907, at 7 p.m. the church of Saint Mary Magdalen, Abbeville, was completely destroyed by fire, as was the presbytery attached to the church. The fire destroyed the baptism register covering 1901–1904. During that period, there were 1541 baptisms. Parishioners were asked to come to the church to record the baptisms that occurred during that time. Of the 1541 baptism records lost, 274 were recovered. Father Laforest erected a temporary frame church, which was blessed under the invocation of St. Ann's. The new Saint Mary Magdalen Church was completed and put into use in 1911.

Father Laforest died on August 26, 1915, and was buried in the new cemetery he had developed. Reverend Julien Ravier Bollard was named the new pastor on July 1, 1915. Father Bollard was a man of great piety, self-sacrifice, zeal, charity and whole-hearted devotion to the flock entrusted to his care. Father Bollard served in Abbeville for 15 years. It was during this time that the Diocese of Lafayette was formed, and Saint Mary Magdalen Parish was part of the new diocese.

On June 20, 1930, His Excellency, Bishop Jeanmard appointed Reverend Edmund Daull, a native of Strasbourg, France, as pastor. Father Daull made many improvements to the church. During Father Daull's pastorate, youth work began in earnest due mainly to the zeal and energy of a young assistant who came in 1938 — Reverend Joseph Verbis Lafleur. Father Lafleur lost his life while a prisoner during World War II. He lost his life while aboard a sinking prisoner of war ship. He was last seen persuading men to leave the hold of the ship, blessing them and helping them up the ladder to possible safety. Father Daull died suddenly on December 5, 1949, and was buried at the foot of the cross in the old cemetery.

Right Reverend Monsignor Paul Fusilier became the new pastor on January 16, 1950. During his pastorate, Monsignor Fusilier was instrumental in building the new Catholic school building for Mount Carmel in 1953. He made many necessary repairs and improvements to the parish church and rectory, including installing the new cross atop the spire himself. In 1951, he erected the new Chapel of Saint Therese of Lisieux on the east side of town, and established a convent for the French Dominican Sisters. Monsignor Fusilier left Abbeville in 1959.

Most Reverend Bishop Robert E. Tracy became the new pastor of Saint Mary Magdalen Parish. Bishop Tracy remained in Abbeville only six months, but accomplished many notable things. Among them: restoring the existing rectory, construction of a six-room catechetical center, tuck pointing and water proofing the exterior of the church, installation of an air conditioning unit at the convent of the Sisters of Mount Carmel, and the development of a successful adult religious education program.

In January 1960, Monsignor Ignatius A. Martin assumed the pastorate and served in Abbeville until October 1973. Monsignor Martin introduced the Legion of Mary, the Charismatic Renewal and the Cursillo to the parish. He was also instrumental in the construction of a music room and an additional classroom at Mount Carmel. Other improvements included the construction of a mausoleum, garden crypt, and Saint Paul Cemetery, a new high school (Vermilion Catholic High), a football stadium, expanded office facilities at the rectory, two parish community retreats, more renovation work on the church which included enlargement of the sacristy. During his pastorate, both extraordinary ministers of the Word and extraordinary ministers of Holy Communion were appointed to serve the Parish community.

Monsignor Richard von Phul Mouton, a native of Lafayette, was welcomed as pastor in November 1973. Monsignor Mouton also made enhancements to the beauty of the church. He sought to expand and improve the ministry to the elderly and homebound, being responsible for the appointment of some seventeen extraordinary ministers of Holy Communion. One of his major accomplishments was a significant reduction of the parish debt. In December 1975, the cellar of the church sacristy was renovated and turned into a weekday Mass chapel. The chapel was named Holy Parents Chapel. Monsignor Mouton served on the Abbeville Bicentennial Committee, which was instrumental in erecting the stature of Pere Antoine Desire Megret in Magdalen Square. Monsignor also commissioned the painting of a mural in the east vestibule of the Holy Parents Chapel to commemorate Saint Mary Magdalen's anniversary. On August 25, 1981, the sacristy and chapel were badly damaged by fire. Repairs and renovations took place in 1981–82. In January 1984, the community center was donated to Mt. Carmel to be used as classrooms and to make room for the new ministries building. The ministries building, which houses the parish offices, a large meeting room, two smaller meeting rooms and a bookstore, was completed in 1985.
