= Mouton Cove, Louisiana =

- Unincorporated community
- Location within Louisiana Location within the United States
- Country: United States
- State: Louisiana
- Parish: Vermilion
- Elevation: 3 ft (0.91 m)
- Time zone: UTC-6 (Central (CST))
  - Summer (DST): UTC-5 (CDT)
- Area code: 337
- GNIS feature ID: 544249

Mouton Cove is an unincorporated community in Vermilion Parish, Louisiana, United States.
