= Bayou L'Ourse, Louisiana =

- Census-designated place
- Location of Bayou L'Ourse in Louisiana
- Coordinates: 29°43′18″N 91°03′28″W
- Country: United States
- State: Louisiana
- Parish: Assumption

Area
  - Total: 2.72 sq mi (7.05 km^{2})
  - Land: 2.72 sq mi (7.05 km^{2})
  - Water: 0 sq mi (0.00 km^{2})
- Elevation: 5 ft (1.5 m)

Population (2020)
  - Total: 1,806
  - Density: 660/sq mi (256/km^{2})
- Time zone: UTC-6 (CST)
  - Summer (DST): UTC-5 (CDT)
- ZIP code: 70380
- Area code: 985
- FIPS code: 22-05378

Bayou L'Ourse is a census-designated place (CDP) in Assumption Parish, Louisiana, United States. As of the 2020 census, Bayou L'Ourse had a population of 1,806.

== Geography ==
Bayou L'Ourse is located at 29°43′18″N 91°3′28″W, located between the Intracoastal Waterway in lower Assumption Parish North along Hwy 662 to Bayou Cheramie on Hwy 398. It is 12 miles (19 km) east of Morgan City 18 miles (29 km) west of Thibodaux and 10 miles (16 km) South of Labadieville.

According to the United States Census Bureau, the CDP has a total area of 2.7 square miles (7.1 km^{2}),

== Demographics ==
Historical population
Census	Pop.	Note	%±
2010	1,978		—
2020	1,806		−8.7%
U.S. Decennial Census

Bayou L'Ourse was first listed as a census designated place in the 2010 U.S. census.
