= Walroy, Louisiana =

Unincorporated community in Louisiana, U.S.

Coordinates: 30°11′51″N 91°59′55″W

Walroy is an unincorporated community in Lafayette Parish, Louisiana, United States.

It is located near the intersection of US Hwy 90 and LA Hwy 728–2.
