= Indian Bayou, Louisiana =

Indian Bayou
- Unincorporated community
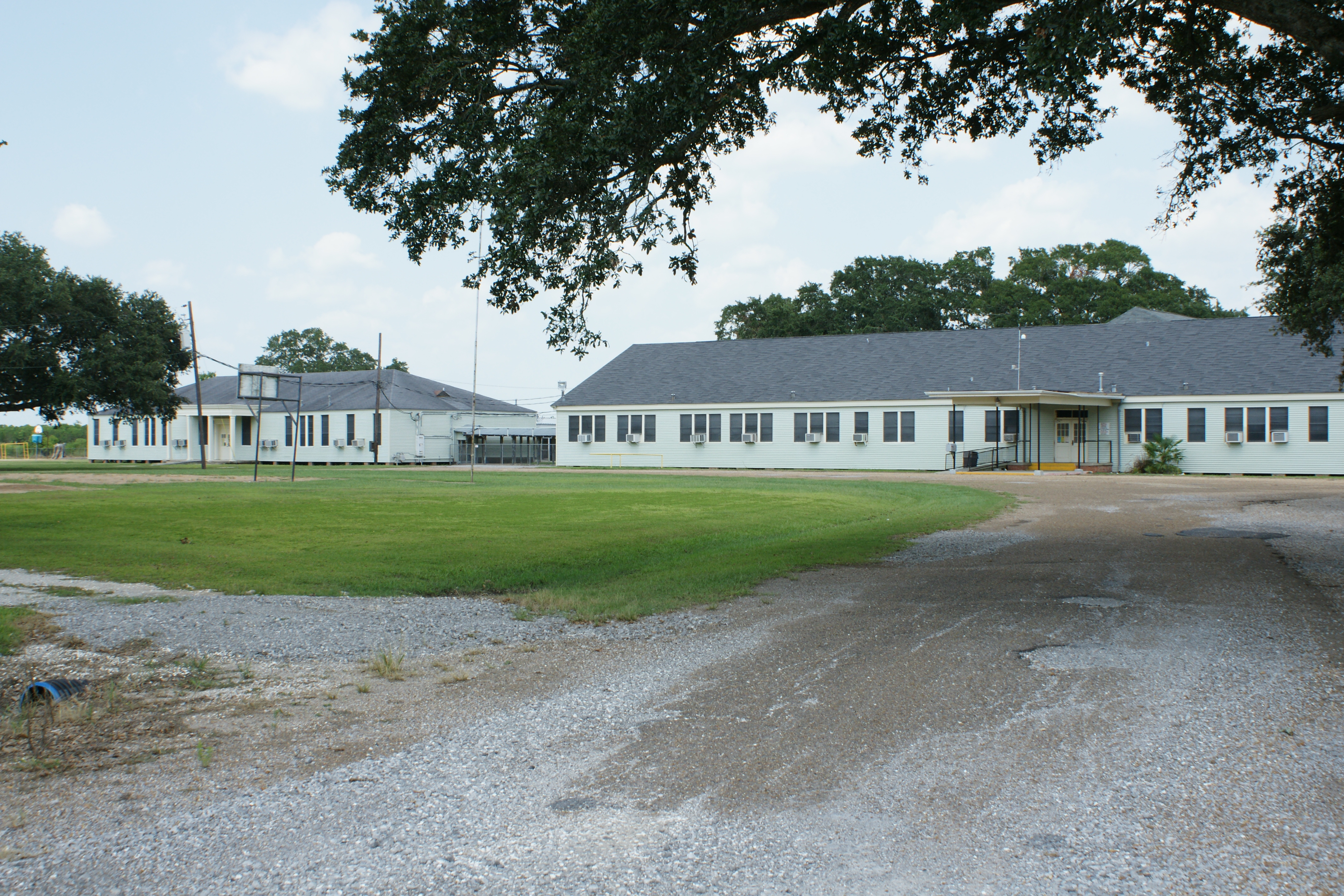
- Indian Bayou School

- Location of Indian Bayou in Louisiana
- Coordinates: 30°7′33″N 92°14′33″W
- Country: United States
- State: Louisiana
- Parish: Vermilion
- Time zone: UTC-6 (CST)
  - Summer (DST): UTC-5 (CDT)
- Area code: 337
- FIPS code: 22-37060
- GNIS feature ID: 543327

Indian Bayou (French: Bayou Indien) is an unincorporated community in Vermilion Parish in southwestern Louisiana, United States. It is part of the Abbeville micropolitan statistical area (μSA). It is located approximately seven miles south of Rayne, eight miles north of Kaplan, and fourteen miles southwest of Lafayette. The area acquired its name from the bayou that forms a portion of the northern border of Vermilion Parish with Lafayette and Acadia parishes.

Indian Bayou consists of mainly farmland and homes with the exception of a Methodist church, a volunteer fire department, an elementary school, and a few locally owned businesses. Most residents travel to the nearby cities of Crowley or Lafayette for employment or shopping.

At one time, Indian Bayou School served children from Kindergarten through 12th grade. Despite the protests of students and local residents, the Vermilion Parish School Board voted to close the high school in 1991, consolidating with nearby North Vermilion High School. Currently, Indian Bayou Elementary School offers Pre-K through the fifth grade.

Indian Bayou is located at 30.1260374 -92.2426278 along Louisiana Highway 700. Other notable highways passing through the area are Louisiana Hwy 92 and Louisiana Hwy 35.

== Notable people ==
- Thomas G. Latour, Sr. (1936–2012), a physician/psychiatrist who served as president of the board of Vermilion Healthcare Center, raised thoroughbred and American Quarter Horse race horses at his farm in Indian Bayou.
