= Ridge, Lafayette Parish, Louisiana =

- Unincorporated community
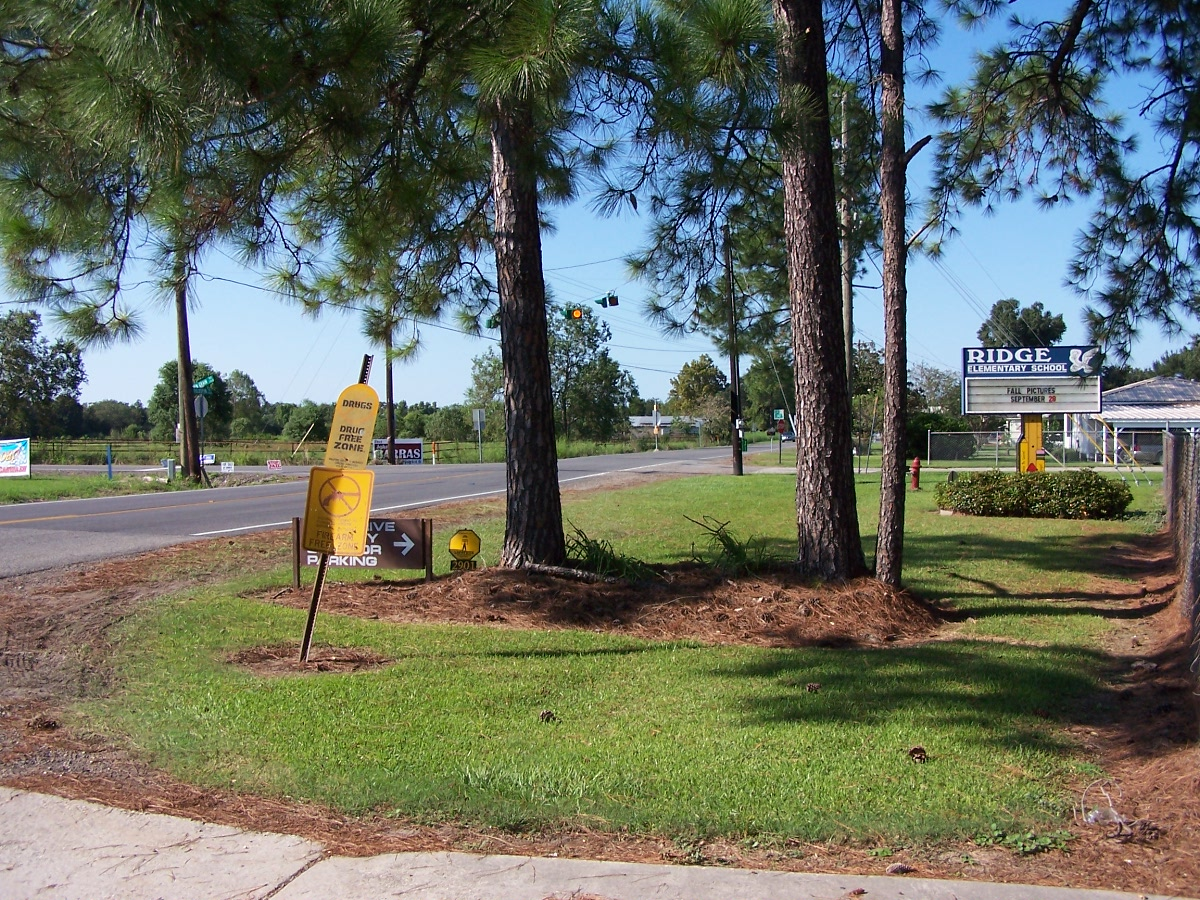
- Downtown Ridge

- Location in Louisiana Location in the United States
- Coordinates: 30°9′33″N 92°10′34″W
- Country: United States
- State: Louisiana
- Parish: Lafayette

Area
  - Total: 8.9 sq mi (23 km^{2})
  - Land: 8.9 sq mi (23 km^{2})
  - Water: 0.0 sq mi (0 km^{2})
- Elevation: 36 ft (11 m)
- Time zone: UTC-6 (CST)
  - Summer (DST): UTC-5 (CDT)
- Area code: 337

Ridge is an unincorporated community in Lafayette Parish, Louisiana, United States.

"Foreman Flats" was the original name of the area, which included Ridge Road in the north, Doc Duhon Road in the south, Lagneaux Road in the east, and South Fieldspan Road in the west. However, the Ridge area is known as residing between W. Congress Street, S. Richfield highway, Riceland Road and Sellers Road in Lafayette Parish. The community is located near the intersection of LA Hwy 343 and LA Hwy 342.

The first settler was Edward G. F. Broussard in 1858 when he purchased 160 acres (0.65 km^{2}). Other original settlers of the area came from Georgia, South Carolina and North Carolina.
