= Meaux, Louisiana =

Unincorporated community in Louisiana, U.S.

Coordinates: 30°01′15″N 92°10′57″W

Meaux is an unincorporated community in Vermilion Parish, Louisiana, United States of America. It is home to many types of farming, including rice, sugarcane, and soybean. Crawfish ponds replace rice fields from February to June.

When first settled around 1850, it was known as Harrington's Island after a cattleman who settled in the area. In 1913, a local shopkeeper named Millington M. Hartman was able to help the community obtain a post office and the town was officially called Millington. Shortly after this in 1919, the four individual schoolhouses in the community were consolidated onto a piece of land that had been donated by a Muriel Daisy Meaux. The town then renamed itself Meaux accordingly.

Meaux Elementary School is located at the intersection of LA 343 and LA 696.
