= Abbeville High School (Louisiana) =

Location
- 1305 Wildcat Drive; Abbeville, Louisiana; United States; 29°58′59″N 92°06′21″W

Information
- Established: 1902
- School board: Vermilion Parish School Board
- Teaching staff: 39.18 (on an FTE basis)
- Grades: 9–12
- Enrollment: 597 (2023–2024)
- Student to teacher ratio: 15.24
- Colors: Red and grey
- Nickname: Wildcats
- Yearbook: The Prowl
- Website: ahs.vpsb.net

Abbeville High School is a public high school for grades 9–12 located in Abbeville, Louisiana, United States and is operated by the Vermilion Parish School Board.

== Athletics ==
Abbeville High athletics competes in the LHSAA.

== Notable alumni ==
- Bobby Duhon, former NFL running back for the New York Giants.
- Brandon Mitchell, former NFL defensive lineman. Started in Super Bowl XXXVI for the New England Patriots.
- Sam H. Theriot, Louisiana House of Representatives
