= Erath, Louisiana =

- Town
- Town of Erath
- Location of Erath in Vermilion Parish, Louisiana.

- Location of Louisiana in the United States
- Coordinates: 29°57′32″N 92°02′15″W
- Country: United States
- State: Louisiana
- Parish: Vermilion

Area
  - Total: 1.76 sq mi (4.55 km^{2})
  - Land: 1.76 sq mi (4.55 km^{2})
  - Water: 0 sq mi (0.00 km^{2})
- Elevation: 7 ft (2.1 m)

Population (2020)
  - Total: 2,028
  - Density: 1,154.4/sq mi (445.72/km^{2})
- Time zone: UTC-6 (CST)
  - Summer (DST): UTC-5 (CDT)
- ZIP code: 70533
- Area code: 337
- FIPS code: 22-24180
- GNIS feature ID: 2406457
- Website: townoferath.com

Erath /ˈiːræθ/ is a town in Vermilion Parish, Louisiana, United States. The population was 2,114 at the 2010 census, and 2,030 at the 2020 population estimates program. It is part of the Abbeville micropolitan statistical area and the Lafayette metropolitan area.

== History ==
Erath is named after August Erath (March 18, 1843 - September 11, 1900) who emigrated from Switzerland to New Orleans in 1860 and was a bookkeeper in the breweries. He moved to New Iberia in 1876 and erected a brewery there. Erath was later mayor of New Iberia and began to develop land in the Erath area. Although August Erath never lived in Erath, he was close to railroad officials, which brought forth a great business venture for him. Later, Erath built a seltzer water factory in New Iberia and an ice plant in Abbeville. In 1884, he started a hardware business and purchased land located in this area.

In 2005, storm surge forced inland by Hurricane Rita flooded most of the town. Water in most parts of town was up to six feet deep.

== Geography ==
According to the United States Census Bureau, the town has a total area of 1.5 square miles (3.9 km^{2}), all land.

Erath is located 20 miles (32 km) south of Lafayette, parish seat of Lafayette Parish via Louisiana Highway 339, 7 miles (11 km) east of Abbeville, parish seat of Vermilion Parish, and 15 miles (24 km) west of New Iberia, parish seat of Iberia Parish via Louisiana Highway 14. The eastern edge of Erath borders with the town of Delcambre on LA-14.

== Demographics ==
Historical population
| Census | Pop. | Note | %± |
|---|---|---|---|
| 1900 | 215 | | — |
| 1910 | 575 | | 167.4% |
| 1920 | 713 | | 24.0% |
| 1930 | 895 | | 25.5% |
| 1940 | 1,408 | | 57.3% |
| 1950 | 1,514 | | 7.5% |
| 1960 | 2,019 | | 33.4% |
| 1970 | 2,024 | | 0.2% |
| 1980 | 2,259 | | 11.6% |
| 1990 | 2,428 | | 7.5% |
| 2000 | 2,187 | | −9.9% |
| 2010 | 2,114 | | −3.3% |
| 2020 | 2,028 | | −4.1% |
| 2025 (est.) | 1,932 | ▼ | −4.7% |
U.S. Decennial Census

Erath racial composition as of 2020
| Race | Number | Percentage |
|---|---|---|
| White (non-Hispanic) | 1,694 | 83.53% |
| Black or African American (non-Hispanic) | 130 | 6.41% |
| Native American | 6 | 0.3% |
| Asian | 89 | 4.39% |
| Other/Mixed | 97 | 4.78% |
| Hispanic or Latino | 52 | 2.56% |

The 2020 United States census counted 2,028 people, 830 households, and 509 families in Erath. The population density was 1,154.2 per square mile (445.7/km^{2}). There were 928 housing units at an average density of 528.2 per square mile (203.9/km^{2}). The racial makeup was 84.12% (1,706) white or European American (83.53% non-Hispanic white), 6.41% (130) black or African-American, 0.3% (6) Native American or Alaska Native, 4.39% (89) Asian, 0.0% (0) Pacific Islander or Native Hawaiian, 0.49% (10) from other races, and 4.29% (87) from two or more races. Hispanic or Latino of any race was 2.56% (52) of the population.

Of the 830 households, 35.8% had children under the age of 18; 36.4% were married couples living together; 38.0% had a female householder with no spouse or partner present. 31.7% of households consisted of individuals and 14.8% had someone living alone who was 65 years of age or older. The average household size was 2.5 and the average family size was 3.0. The percent of those with a bachelor's degree or higher was estimated to be 15.3% of the population.

25.4% of the population was under the age of 18, 8.3% from 18 to 24, 24.5% from 25 to 44, 25.0% from 45 to 64, and 16.8% who were 65 years of age or older. The median age was 39.0 years. For every 100 females, there were 115.5 males. For every 100 females ages 18 and older, there were 125.0 males.

The 2016–2020 5-year American Community Survey estimates show that the median household income was $37,198 (with a margin of error of +/- $10,630) and the median family income was $40,341 (+/- $16,273). Males had a median income of $41,250 (+/- $16,514) versus $25,595 (+/- $5,021) for females. The median income for those above 16 years old was $29,938 (+/- $5,893). Approximately, 16.1% of families and 17.1% of the population were below the poverty line, including 21.8% of those under the age of 18 and 23.3% of those ages 65 or over.

== Economy ==
Erath is home to Henry Hub, an important junction of natural gas pipeline systems. Natural gas prices in North America are more or less set at this junction.

The "Henry" hub is so named for its location in the Henry hamlet of Erath, which was named after the Henry High School that stood there until damage from flooding due to Hurricane Rita forced its closure and demolition. This school was named for its benefactor, William Henry, who originally immigrated from Copenhagen, Denmark as Ludwig Wilhelm Kattentidt, circa 1840, then dropped the surname and used his father's middle 'Heinrich' for his surname of Henry. There are Henry descendants in the area to this day.

It was customary for benefactors to sponsor schools; there were quite a few similarly sponsored schools in Vermilion Parish around that time. Being that long ago and in a rural area, with schools sometimes sponsored even in homes, there was great variation in what was offered to how many, and it often changed over time. Records say that the Henry school was founded in 1877, and apparently became a high school in 1896 because it celebrated its centennial in 1996.

In 1992, the Vermilion Parish school district reorganized the schools. Students transferred to Erath High, and Henry High became an elementary school. Then on September 24, 2005 (less than a month after Hurricane Katrina), Hurricane Rita smashed the parish and ruined the school. The area was also hit hard three years later by Hurricane Ike, and the main building was finally razed around March 2009. Likewise, St. John Catholic Church across the street had its rectory damaged; it is being replaced with a new building elevated to meet new flood standards as of early 2014.

When land for the Henry school was bequeathed, it was stipulated for education into perpetuity, or to be returned to the heirs. The gymnasium was salvaged and is still used by the school district to this day. A Google Earth comparison of, for example, February 28, 2006, to April 23, 2012, at the intersection of Highways 330 and 689 shows a parking lot where the main school was, and the church's rectory gone, but the gymnasium in clear use by child sports organizations and other groups.

== Notable people ==
- Dylon Hoffpauir, NFL Cheerleader for the New Orleans Saints and head cheer & dance coach at Loyola University New Orleans
- Dudley J. LeBlanc, served in legislature and ran for governor on three occasions.
- Doris Leon "D. L." Menard, songwriter, performer, and recording artist
- Elijah Mitchell, NFL running back for the Philadelphia Eagles practice squad.
- Randy Romero, Thoroughbred Racing Hall of Fame jockey
