= Vermilion Parish, Louisiana =

Parish in Louisiana, United States

Vermilion Parish
- Parish
- Parish of Vermilion; Paroisse de Vermillion (French)
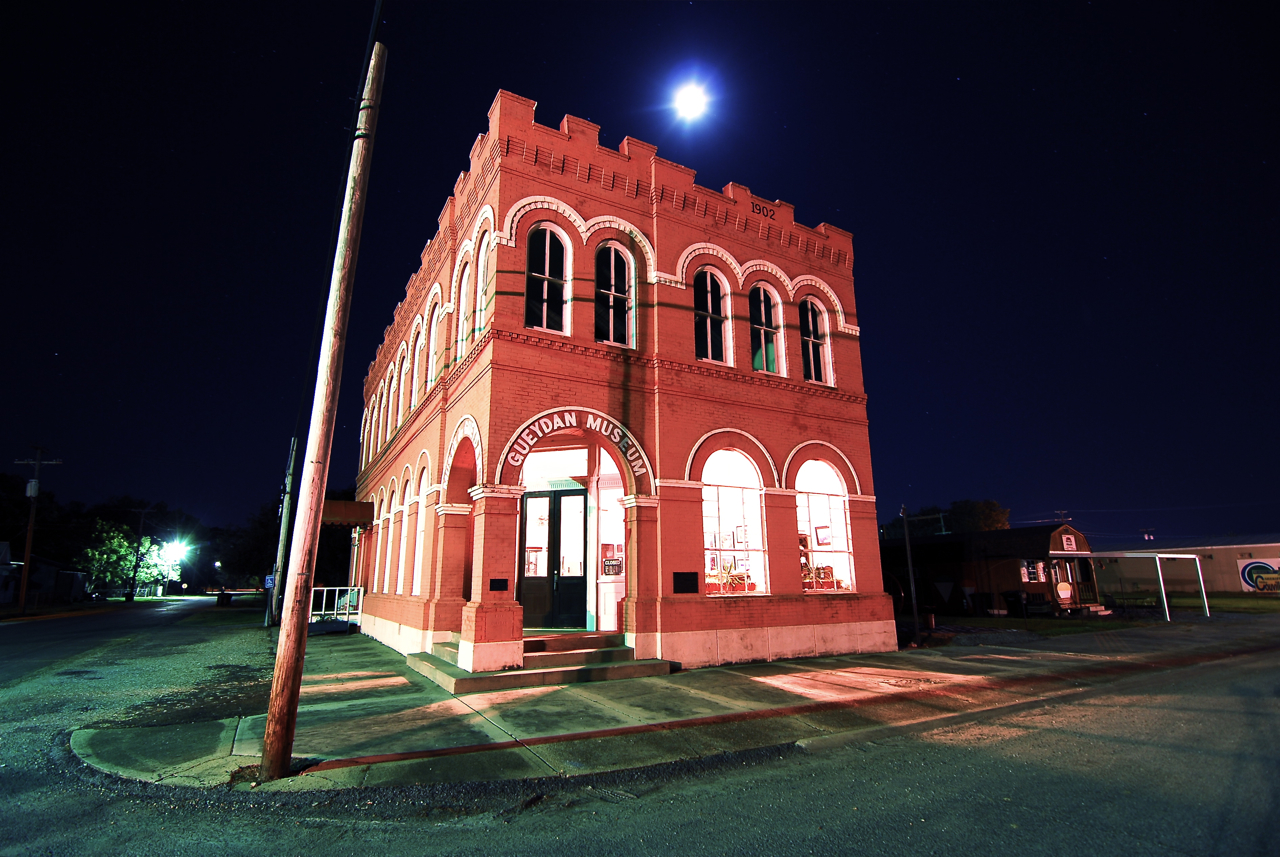
- Museum at Gueydan, Louisiana

- Location within the U.S. state of Louisiana
- Coordinates: 29°49′N 92°19′W
- Country: United States
- State: Louisiana
- Founded: 1844
- Named for: Vermilion River and Bay
- Seat: Abbeville
- Largest city: Abbeville

Area
  - Total: 1,542 sq mi (3,990 km^{2})
  - Land: 1,173 sq mi (3,040 km^{2})
  - Water: 369 sq mi (960 km^{2}) 24%

Population (2020)
  - Total: 57,359
  - Estimate (2025): 57,671 ▲
  - Density: 48.90/sq mi (18.88/km^{2})
- Time zone: UTC−6 (Central)
  - Summer (DST): UTC−5 (CDT)
- Congressional district: 3rd
- Website: https://vppj.org/

Vermilion Parish (French: Paroisse de Vermillion) is a parish located in the U.S. state of Louisiana, created in 1844. The parish seat is Abbeville. Vermilion Parish is part of the Lafayette metropolitan statistical area, and located in southern Acadiana. At the 2020 U.S. census, the population was 57,359.

In the past several decades, much of the southern portion of the parish has been swept away by water erosion, especially after Hurricane Katrina and Hurricane Rita in 2005.

== History ==
Indigenous peoples lived in the area for thousands of years, from different cultures. By historic times, the Chitimacha and Atakapa inhabited the area and were the American Indians encountered by Spanish and French explorers and settlers. The tribes' numbers were drastically reduced as a result of exposure to European diseases.

French, Spanish, enslaved Africans, and French-Canadians from Acadia expelled after the Seven Years' War won by Great Britain, had all entered the area by the end of the 18th century. As the population became mostly Cajun, the primary language was French for years. In the mid- to late 19th century, they were joined by European Americans; immigrants from Italy, recruited to work on the plantations, as well as Jewish immigrants from Germany and eastern Europe due to outreach efforts from the state via the Louisiana Immigration Society. They tended to settle in towns and become merchants.

SpaceX plans to start construction of a spaceport, known as Starbase Louisiana, near Pecan Island, with work beginning in 2027 with the goal of launching rockets in 2029.

== Geography ==
Timelapse of six years in southern Vermilion Parish, Louisiana (1973, 1980, 1986, 1992, 2003, 2011) land being overtaken by water

According to the U.S. Census Bureau, the parish has a total area of 1,542 square miles (3,990 km^{2}), of which 1,173 square miles (3,040 km^{2}) is land and 369 square miles (960 km^{2}) (24%) is water. It is the fifth-largest parish in Louisiana by total area. The Gulf of Mexico is located to the south of the parish.

=== Major highways ===
- U.S. Highway 167
- Louisiana Highway 13
- Louisiana Highway 14
  - LA 14 Bus.
- Louisiana Highway 82
- Louisiana Highway 89
- Louisiana Highway 91
- Louisiana Highway 92
- Louisiana Highway 330
- Louisiana Highway 331
- Louisiana Highway 332
- Louisiana Highway 333
- Louisiana Highway 335
- Louisiana Highway 338
- Louisiana Highway 339
- Louisiana Highway 343
- Louisiana Highway 682
- Louisiana Highway 685
- Louisiana Highway 690
- Louisiana Highway 694
- Louisiana Highway 695
- Louisiana Highway 696
- Louisiana Highway 697
- Louisiana Highway 699
- Louisiana Highway 700
- Louisiana Highway 705
- Louisiana Highway 708
- Louisiana Highway 711
- Louisiana Highway 713
- Louisiana Highway 714
- Louisiana Highway 717
- Louisiana Highway 1246
- Louisiana Highway 1266
- Louisiana Highway 3093
- Louisiana Highway 3143
- Louisiana Highway 3147

=== Adjacent parishes ===
- Acadia Parish (north)
- Lafayette Parish (northeast)
- Iberia Parish (east)
- Cameron Parish (west)
- Jefferson Davis Parish (northwest)

=== Communities ===
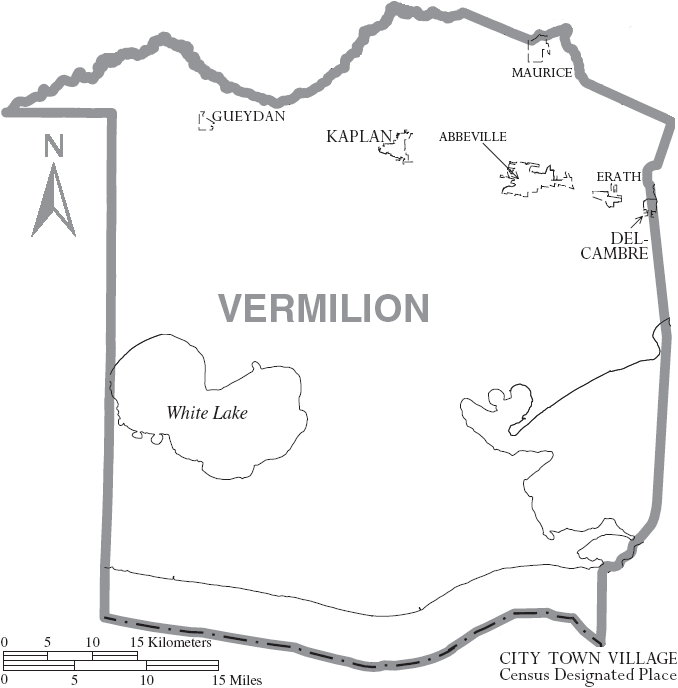
Map of Vermilion Parish, with municipal labels

==== Cities ====
- Abbeville (parish seat and largest municipality)
- Kaplan

==== Towns ====
- Delcambre (partly in Iberia Parish)
- Erath
- Gueydan
- Maurice

==== Census-designated place ====
- Perry

==== Unincorporated communities ====
- Bancker
- Boston
- Bayou Tigre
- Camille
- Charogne
- Chenier Au Tigre
- Cossinade
- Cow Island
- Esther
- Forked Island
- Grosse Isle
- Henry
- Leblanc
- Leroy
- Indian Bayou
- Intracoastal City
- Laurents Point
- Leleux
- Leroy
- Mack
- Marceaux
- Meaux
- Mouton Cove
- Mulvey
- Nunez
- Pecan Island
- Riceville
- Rose Hill
- Theall
- Woodlawn
- Wright
- Youngs

== Demographics ==
Historical population
Census	Pop.	Note	%±
1850	3,409		—
1860	4,324		26.8%
1870	4,528		4.7%
1880	8,728		92.8%
1890	14,234		63.1%
1900	20,705		45.5%
1910	26,390		27.5%
1920	26,482		0.3%
1930	33,684		27.2%
1940	37,750		12.1%
1950	36,929		−2.2%
1960	38,855		5.2%
1970	43,071		10.9%
1980	48,458		12.5%
1990	50,055		3.3%
2000	53,807		7.5%
2010	57,999		7.8%
2020	57,359		−1.1%
2025 (est.)	57,671	▲	0.5%
U.S. Decennial Census; 1790–1960 1900–1990; 1990–2000 2010

Vermilion Parish, Louisiana – Racial and ethnic composition Note: the US Census treats Hispanic/Latino as an ethnic category. This table excludes Latinos from the racial categories and assigns them to a separate category. Hispanics/Latinos may be of any race.
Race / Ethnicity (NH = Non-Hispanic)	Pop 1980	Pop 1990	Pop 2000	Pop 2010	Pop 2020	% 1980	% 1990	% 2000	% 2010	% 2020
White alone (NH)	41,005	41,765	44,026	46,305	44,020	84.62%	83.44%	81.82%	79.84%	76.74%
Black or African American alone (NH)	6,365	6,930	7,527	8,246	7,859	13.14%	13.84%	13.99%	14.22%	13.70%
Native American or Alaska Native alone (NH)	35	77	153	195	171	0.07%	0.15%	0.28%	0.34%	0.30%
Asian alone (NH)	216	671	971	1,148	1,253	0.45%	1.34%	1.80%	1.98%	2.18%
Native Hawaiian or Pacific Islander alone (NH)	x	x	4	4	9	x	x	0.01%	0.01%	0.02%
Other race alone (NH)	11	20	18	53	170	0.02%	0.04%	0.03%	0.09%	0.30%
Mixed race or Multiracial (NH)	x	x	366	667	1,581	x	x	0.68%	1.15%	2.76%
Hispanic or Latino (any race)	826	592	742	1,381	2,296	1.70%	1.18%	1.38%	2.38%	4.00%
Total	48,458	50,055	53,807	57,999	57,359	100.00%	100.00%	100.00%	100.00%	100.00%

Home to a number of Cajun peoples, at the 2000 U.S. census, there were 53,807 people, 19,832 households, and 14,457 families residing in the parish. The population density was 46 people per square mile (18 people/km^{2}). At the 2019 American Community Survey, there were 59,865 people living in the parish, up from 57,999 at the 2010 U.S. census. By the 2020 United States census, there were 57,359 people, 22,086 households, and 15,143 families residing in the parish.

In 2000, were 22,461 housing units at an average density of 19 per square mile (7.3/km^{2}). The racial makeup of the parish was 82.68% White, 14.17% Black or African American, 0.30% Native American, 1.82% Asian, 0.01% Pacific Islander, 0.26% from other races, and 0.76% from two or more races; 1.38% of the population were Hispanic or Latin American of any race; 24.89% reported speaking French or Cajun French at home, while 1.64% speak Vietnamese and 1.02% Spanish. In 2019, the racial and ethnic makeup was 81.4% non-Hispanic white, 14.5% Black and African American, 0.5% Native American, 2.0% Asian, 0.1% Pacific Islander, 0.4% some other race, and 1.1% from two or more races. An estimated 3.5% of the population were Hispanic and Latin American of any race.

At the 2000 U.S. census, there were 19,832 households, out of which 37.10% had children under the age of 18 living with them, 55.50% were married couples living together, 13.00% had a female householder with no husband present, and 27.10% were non-families. 23.10% of all households were made up of individuals, and 10.90% had someone living alone who was 65 years of age or older. The average household size was 2.67 and the average family size was 3.16. The 2019 American Community Survey determined there were 22,086 households and 26,586 housing units; there was a home-ownership rate of 77% and the median housing value was $122,200. The median gross rent from 2015 to 2019 was $685.

In 2019, the median income for a household in the parish was $51,945; males had a median income of $53,658 versus $33,327 for females. About 21.3% of the children under 18 lived at or below the poverty line, and 17.6% of the total population was below the poverty line. The median income for a household in the parish was $29,500, and the median income for a family was $36,093 in 2000. Males had a median income of $31,044 versus $18,710 for females. The per capita income for the parish was $14,201. About 17.40% of families and 22.10% of the population were below the poverty line, including 30.00% of those under age 18 and 21.40% of those age 65 or over.

== Education ==
Vermilion Parish School Board has an official territory covering the entire parish. It operates most public schools in the parish. Schools serving Delcambre are located in Vermilion Parish but are operated by the Iberia Parish School System. The Vermilion Parish district pays money to the Iberia parish district to educate Delcambre students in Vermilion Parish.

=== Schools ===
Public Schools that are run by the Vermilion Parish School Board include:

- Cecil Picard Elementary (Grades PK-5) (Maurice)
- Dozier Elementary (Grades PK-5) (Erath)
- Eaton Park Elementary (Grades PK-2) (Abbeville)
- Forked Island - E. Broussard Elementary (Grades PK-8) (Abbeville)
- Indian Bayou Elementary (Grades PK-5) (Rayne)
- James A. Herod Elementary (Grades 3–5) (Abbeville)
- Jesse Owens Elementary (Grades PK-5) (Gueydan)
- Kaplan Elementary (Grades PK-4) (Kaplan)
- Leblanc Elementary (Grades PK-5) (Abbeville)
- Meaux Elementary (Grades PK-5) (Abbeville)
- Seventh Ward Elementary (Grades PK-5) (Abbeville)
- Erath Middle (Grades 6–8) (Erath)
- J. H. Williams Middle (Grades 6–8) (Abbeville)
- North Vermilion Middle (Grades 6–8) (Maurice)
- Rene A. Rost Middle (Grades 5–8) (Kaplan)
- Abbeville High School (Grades 9–12) (Abbeville)
- Erath High School (Grades 9–12) (Erath)
- Gueydan High (Grades 6–12) (Gueydan)
- Kaplan High (Grades 9–12) (Kaplan)
- North Vermilion High School (Grades 9–12) (Maurice)

Vermilion Parish is also served by the Diocese of Lafayette with three schools:

- Maltrait Memorial School (Grades PK-8) (Kaplan)
- Mt. Carmel Catholic School (Grades PK-8) (Abbeville)
- Vermilion Catholic High School (Grades 9–12) (Abbeville)

Additionally, Vermilion Parish is served by two unaffiliated private schools:

- Harvest Time Christian Academy (Grades PK-12) (Abbeville)
- Lighthouse Christian High School (Grades 9–12) (Abbeville)

Vermilion Parish is served by one institution of higher education:

- South Louisiana Community College service area, Gulf Area Campus (Abbeville)

== Politics ==
United States presidential election results for Vermilion Parish, Louisiana
Year	Republican		Democratic		Third party(ies)	
Year	No.	%	No.	%	No.	%
1912	124	13.93%	531	59.66%	235	26.40%
1916	78	3.47%	1,340	59.56%	832	36.98%
1920	1,420	72.08%	549	27.87%	1	0.05%
1924	416	41.03%	598	58.97%	0	0.00%
1928	451	14.88%	2,580	85.12%	0	0.00%
1932	269	8.37%	2,945	91.63%	0	0.00%
1936	496	10.66%	4,141	89.02%	15	0.32%
1940	2,621	34.53%	4,969	65.47%	0	0.00%
1944	676	12.61%	4,684	87.39%	0	0.00%
1948	1,212	19.36%	1,806	28.85%	3,243	51.80%
1952	3,868	42.37%	5,261	57.63%	0	0.00%
1956	3,877	44.59%	4,564	52.49%	254	2.92%
1960	2,170	14.87%	11,257	77.13%	1,168	8.00%
1964	4,984	35.13%	9,204	64.87%	0	0.00%
1968	3,278	21.55%	3,806	25.03%	8,124	53.42%
1972	8,909	66.39%	3,876	28.88%	635	4.73%
1976	6,133	34.36%	11,246	63.00%	471	2.64%
1980	10,481	48.96%	9,743	45.51%	1,185	5.54%
1984	12,721	56.85%	9,033	40.37%	624	2.79%
1988	9,224	41.99%	12,180	55.45%	562	2.56%
1992	7,062	30.12%	12,324	52.57%	4,058	17.31%
1996	7,653	33.77%	12,609	55.64%	2,399	10.59%
2000	12,495	56.20%	8,704	39.15%	1,036	4.66%
2004	15,069	61.38%	9,085	37.00%	398	1.62%
2008	18,069	72.76%	6,266	25.23%	498	2.01%
2012	18,910	75.68%	5,720	22.89%	357	1.43%
2016	20,063	78.27%	4,857	18.95%	712	2.78%
2020	21,930	80.26%	5,009	18.33%	385	1.41%
2024	21,510	81.39%	4,637	17.55%	282	1.07%

For most of the 20th Century, Vermillion was a Democratic-leaning parish, voting Republican only in landslide elections such as 1972, 1980, and 1984. However, like other Acadian parishes with large Cajun populations, the county has turned sharply right in the 21st century based on cultural issues and Democrats' discomfort with the oil and gas industry.

== See also ==
- National Register of Historic Places listings in Vermilion Parish, Louisiana
