= Kaplan, Louisiana =

- City
- City of Kaplan
- Nickname: Gateway to the Coastal Wetlands
- Location of Kaplan in Vermilion Parish, Louisiana

- Location of Louisiana in the United States
- Coordinates: 30°00′10″N 92°16′45″W
- Country: United States
- State: Louisiana
- Parish: Vermilion

Area
  - Total: 2.33 sq mi (6.03 km^{2})
  - Land: 2.33 sq mi (6.03 km^{2})
  - Water: 0 sq mi (0.00 km^{2})
- Elevation: 10 ft (3.0 m)

Population (2020)
  - Total: 4,352
  - Density: 1,868.9/sq mi (721.59/km^{2})
- Time zone: UTC-6 (CST)
  - Summer (DST): UTC-5 (CDT)
- ZIP Code: 70548
- Area code: 337
- FIPS code: 22-39055
- GNIS feature ID: 2404817
- Website: www.kaplanla.com

Kaplan is a city in Vermilion Parish, Louisiana, United States. The population was 4,600 at the 2010 census, and 4,345 at the 2020 population estimates program. It is part of the Abbeville micropolitan statistical area in Acadiana.

== History ==
In 1896, the Holy Rosary Catholic Church was established in the growing European-American settlement. Most of the people were Acadian, so the main language was French. The town was named after Abrom Kaplan, who bought the Jim Todd Plantation in 1901. The town of Kaplan grew quickly and was established in 1902. The following year, residents created the first school.

On July 14, 1906, the first Bastille Day Celebration was held. In 1911, the Eleazar Theater was built. In 1916, the Kaplan Telephone Company began. In 1920, the school was rebuilt.

The Kaplan Herald has been in continuous publication since 1956 as the Kaplan Journal. When Conrad Kaplan purchased the newspaper in 1965, he named it the Kaplan Herald. It remained under his ownership until his death in 1992, when Louisiana State Newspaper purchased the Kaplan Herald from his estate.

On September 10, 1961, the town was hit by a destructive F3 tornado spawned by Hurricane Carla. Most of the town was heavily damaged and one person was killed.

== Geography ==
According to the United States Census Bureau, the city has a total area of 2.2 square miles (5.7 km^{2}), all land.

Louisiana Highway 14 passes through the city which heads 10 miles (16 km) east to Abbeville, the Vermilion Parish seat, and 15 miles (24 km) west to the town of Gueydan. Louisiana Highway 13 intersects with LA-14 outside the city limits and heads north to the cities of Crowley (26 miles) and Eunice (39 miles). Louisiana Highway 35, which intersects LA-14 as North Cushing Avenue, heads north 18 miles (29 km) to Rayne.

== Demographics ==
Historical population
Census	Pop.	Note	%±
1910	315		—
1920	876		178.1%
1930	1,653		88.7%
1940	2,838		71.7%
1950	4,562		60.7%
1960	5,267		15.5%
1970	5,540		5.2%
1980	5,016		−9.5%
1990	4,535		−9.6%
2000	5,177		14.2%
2010	4,600		−11.1%
2020	4,352		−5.4%
2025 (est.)	4,116	▼	−5.4%
U.S. Decennial Census

Kaplan racial composition as of 2020
Race	Number	Percentage
White (non-Hispanic)	3,393	77.96%
Black or African American (non-Hispanic)	605	13.9%
Native American	11	0.25%
Asian	43	0.99%
Other/Mixed	178	4.09%
Hispanic or Latino	122	2.8%

According to the 2000 U.S. census, there were 5,177 people, 2,069 households, and 1,342 families residing in the city. The population density was 2,298.6 inhabitants per square mile (887.5/km^{2}). There were 2,265 housing units at an average density of 1,005.7 per square mile (388.3/km^{2}). The 2020 population estimates program determined 4,345 people lived in the city. According to the 2020 United States census, there were 4,352 people, 1,638 households, and 898 families residing in the city.

In 2000, the racial makeup of the city was 85.13% White, 12.92% African American, 0.17% Native American, 0.50% Asian, 0.02% Pacific Islander, 0.21% from other races, and 1.04% from two or more races. Hispanic or Latino Americans of any race were 1.20% of the population. In 2019, the American Community Survey estimated the racial and ethnic makeup was 84.1% White alone, 14.8% African American, 0.5% Asian alone, and 0.6% two or more races.

At the 2000 census, were 2,069 households, out of which 31.6% had children under the age of 18 living with them, 46.3% were married couples living together, 14.2% had a female householder with no husband present, and 35.1% were non-families. 30.9% of all households were made up of individuals, and 17.0% had someone living alone who was 65 years of age or older. The average household size was 2.45 and the average family size was 3.06. In the city, the population was spread out, with 25.8% under the age of 18, 9.4% from 18 to 24, 25.5% from 25 to 44, 19.5% from 45 to 64, and 19.7% who were 65 years of age or older. The median age was 37 years. For every 100 females, there were 86.8 males. For every 100 females age 18 and over, there were 80.3 males.

At the 2019 American Community Survey, the median household income was $34,943; males had a median income of $52,747 versus $33,750 for females. An estimated 24.1% of the population lived at or below the poverty line. In 2000, the median income for a household in the city was $22,535, and the median income for a family was $30,236. Males had a median income of $29,387 versus $19,198 for females. The per capita income for the city was $12,340. About 25.0% of families and 33.5% of the population were below the poverty line, including 48.3% of those under age 18 and 32.3% of those age 65 or over.

== Education ==
It is within Vermilion Parish School Board.

== Notable people ==
- Inez Catalon, Creole singer
- Iron Eyes Cody, portrayed Native Americans as actor
- Sammy Kershaw, American Country and Western music singer and songwriter
- Jonathan W. Perry, former Kaplan city council member and state representative
- Frank Glasgow Tinker, Spanish Civil War volunteer pilot and flying ace
