= Maurice, Louisiana =

- Town
- Town of Maurice
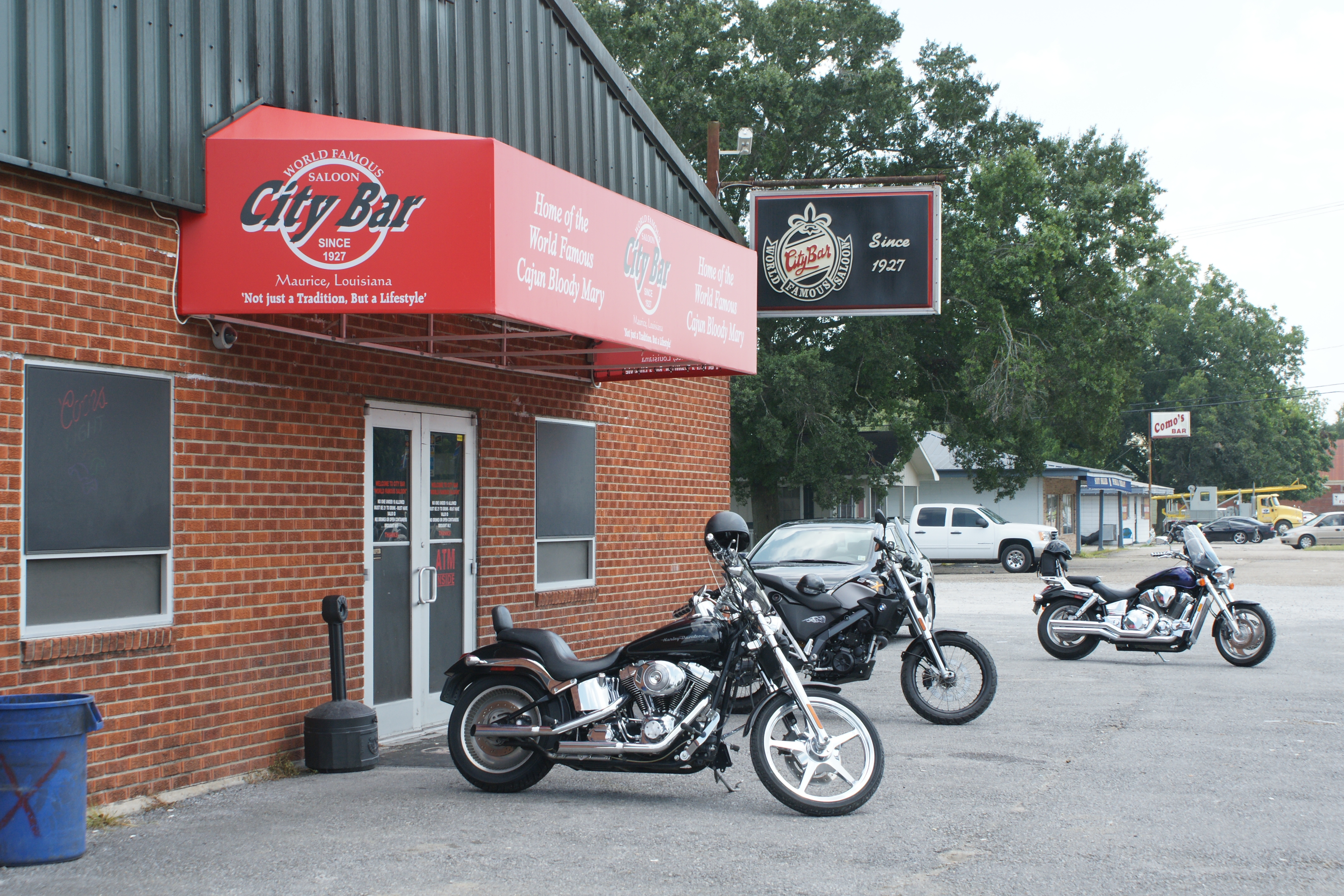
- The City Bar

- Location of Maurice in Vermilion Parish, Louisiana.
- Coordinates: 30°06′09″N 92°07′29″W
- Country: United States
- State: Louisiana
- Parish: Vermilion

Area
  - Total: 2.78 sq mi (7.21 km^{2})
  - Land: 2.78 sq mi (7.21 km^{2})
  - Water: 0 sq mi (0.00 km^{2})
- Elevation: 20 ft (6.1 m)

Population (2020)
  - Total: 2,118
  - Density: 760.7/sq mi (293.69/km^{2})
- Time zone: UTC-6 (CST)
  - Summer (DST): UTC-5 (CDT)
- ZIP code: 70555
- Area code(s): 337
- FIPS code: 22-49240
- GNIS feature ID: 2407498

Maurice is a town in Vermilion Parish, Louisiana, United States. The population was 964 at the 2010 census and 2,118 for the 2020 Census. It is part of the Abbeville micropolitan statistical area.

== History ==
The first St. Alphonsus Catholic Church in 1893

The village, originally called "Mauriceville", derives its name from its founder Maurice Villien. Villien, a native of Savoy, France, came to America in 1855 and sold goods in New Orleans, New Iberia and Milton. His wife had land holdings there and they established a home and grocery store. On May 29, 1889, the 10-acre (40,000 m^{2}) site, on which the church and rectory in Maurice were to be built, was donated by Villien. The town was incorporated on December 27, 1911, and Joseph Villien, Maurice's son, became mayor until 1928. Today, Joseph Street leads to the old home.

The community's first church was La Chapelle a Maurice and Sunday services were held in a small schoolhouse on the Villien property until the St. Alphonsus Church was built in January 1893. The Broussard Cove School was the first school built on land donated by Joseph Clark in 1885 and moved to Maurice in July 1899 to land donated by Maurice Villien. It was located on Maurice Avenue and the Indian Bayou Road until 1914 when it burned down.

== Geography ==
Maurice is located along the Gulf Coast in southern Louisiana. According to the United States Census Bureau, the village has a total area of 2.0 square miles (5.3 km^{2}), all land.

The northeastern border of the village is the Vermilion/Lafayette parish line. U.S. Route 167 passes through the village heading 11 miles (18 km) northeast to Lafayette, the parish seat of Lafayette Parish and 10 miles (16 km) south to Abbeville, the parish seat of Vermilion Parish. The communities of Youngsville 9 miles (14 km) and Milton 4 miles (6.4 km) are both located east of the village via Louisiana Highway 92 which intersects with U.S. 167.

== Demographics ==
Historical population
Census	Pop.	Note	%±
1930	330		—
1940	420		27.3%
1950	335		−20.2%
1960	411		22.7%
1970	476		15.8%
1980	478		0.4%
1990	432		−9.6%
2000	642		48.6%
2010	964		50.2%
2020	2,118		119.7%
2025 (est.)	3,215	▲	51.8%

At the 2000 United States census, there were 642 people, 257 households, and 177 families residing in the village. The population density was 315.0 inhabitants per square mile (121.6/km^{2}). There were 276 housing units at an average density of 135.4 units per square mile (52.3 units/km^{2}). At the 2020 population estimates program, there were 1,857 people living in the village, up from 964 at the 2010 United States census.

According to the 2019 American Community Survey, the racial and ethnic makeup of the village was 89.6% non-Hispanic white, 5.9% Black and African American, 0.2% American Indian and Alaska Native, 1.5% Asian alone, and 0.6% two or more races; 2.2% of the population was Hispanic and Latin American of any race. At the 2000 U.S. census, the racial makeup of the village was 79.13% White, 19.63% African American, 0.16% Native American, 0.78% Asian, and 0.31% from two or more races; Hispanic and Latin Americans of any race were 1.40% of the population. In 2005, 74.8% of the population over the age of five spoke English at home, and 25.2% of the population spoke French or Cajun.

In 2000, the median income for a household in the village was $29,306, and the median income for a family was $32,841. Males had a median income of $28,571 versus $21,250 for females. The per capita income for the village was $15,051. About 16.6% of families and 19.3% of the population were below the poverty line, including 22.5% of those under age 18 and 21.8% of those age 65 or over. From 2015 to 2019, the median household income was $67,143. Males had a median income of $54,141 versus $40,139 for females; an estimated 7.8% of the population lived at or below the poverty line.

== Notable people ==
- Denise Boutte, actress
- Inez Catalon, Creole singer
- J. Keith Desormeaux, horse trainer
- Kent Desormeaux, Hall of Fame jockey
- Ezola B. Foster, conservative political activist and author
- Jesse Hernandez, National Football League cheerleader
