= Abbeville, Louisiana =

- City
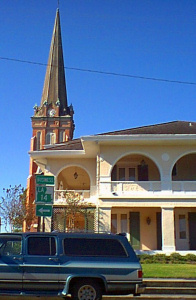
- St. Mary Magdalene Church

- Location within Vermilion Parish and Louisiana

- Location of Louisiana in the United States
- Coordinates: 29°58′30″N 92°06′55″W
- Country: United States
- State: Louisiana
- Parish: Vermilion
- Incorporated: 1850

Government
  - Mayor: Anita Levy (Democrat)

Area
  - Total: 6.08 sq mi (15.74 km^{2})
  - Land: 6.05 sq mi (15.66 km^{2})
  - Water: 0.031 sq mi (0.08 km^{2})
- Elevation: 7 ft (2.1 m)

Population (2020)
  - Total: 11,186
  - Estimate (2024): 10,902 ▼
  - Density: 1,849.9/sq mi (714.26/km^{2})
- Time zone: UTC-6 (CST)
  - Summer (DST): UTC-5 (CDT)
- ZIP code: 70510, 70511
- Area code: 337
- FIPS code: 22-00100
- GNIS feature ID: 2403057
- Website: cityofabbeville.net

Abbeville is a city in and the parish seat of Vermilion Parish, Louisiana, United States. The population was 11,186 at the 2020 census. At the 2020 population estimates program, the population of the city was 11,927. It is located 21 miles (34 km) southwest of Lafayette.

== History ==
Formerly called La Chapelle, the land that became Abbeville was purchased by founding father Père Antoine Désiré Mégret ("Père" is French for "Father"), a Capuchin missionary on July 25, 1843, for $900. There are two hypotheses as to how the town was named. The more generally accepted hypothesis is that Mégret named the town after his home in France. The second hypothesis states that it is a combination of "Abbé" (the French word for "Abbot") for Abbé Mégret, and "ville" (the French word for "Town") – hence Abbé's town. Some support for the second theory can be found in the fact that the town in France is pronounced differently (as "Abbville") by its denizens. However, in 1995, Jean Desobry discovered in the diocesan archives of Amiens evidence that Antoine Jacques Désiré Mégret was born on May 23, 1797, in Abbeville, France, thus confirming the first hypothesis. Dr Mary-Theresa MacCarthy wrote in her article Un Autre Abbeville in the 1996 edition of Bulletin de la Société des Antiquaires de Picardie (translation by Father Hebert),

On February 12, 1844, the pastor gave to his American town the name of the town of his birth. Residents find this name especially fitting because of the French word abbé which means father [or priest] added to the French word ville [which means town]. Their Abbeville is truly la ville de l'abbé [the priest's town].

Settlers were primarily descendants of the Acadians from Nova Scotia that moved to the area from 1766 to 1775. The town was incorporated in 1850. There were two people living on the land at the time, Joseph LeBlanc and his wife Isabelle Broussard, whose former home Father Megret converted into a chapel. The chapel burned in 1854 and, in 1910, St. Mary Magdalen Catholic Church was built, which still stands today.

Father Megret modeled his original plan for the village after a French Provincial village. In a map he designed in 1846, the town was 38 to 40 acres (160,000 m^{2}) in size. It was bounded on the north by St. Victor Boulevard, on the south by Lafayette Boulevard, on the east by "the Sisters of Charity", and on the west by Bayou Vermilion. At this point in time the town was called "Abbville".

The center of downtown is Magdalen Square, which is accented by large oak trees, a fountain, and gazebo. A statue in memory of Father Megret stands in the square. In 1856, the Last Island Hurricane destroyed every building in the town.

== Geography ==
According to the United States Census Bureau, the town has a total area of 5.7 square miles (14.7629 km^{2}), of which 5.7 square miles (15 km^{2}) is land and 0.04 square miles (0.10 km^{2}) (0.53%) is water. Abbeville is located near the southern terminus of U.S. Highway 167. Abbeville Chris Crusta Memorial Airport is in the eastern part of the city. The Vermilion River runs through downtown, and several canals and coulees run through other parts of Abbeville.

=== Climate ===
Abbeville has a humid subtropical climate in common with the rest of Louisiana. It typically experiences long, hot and very humid summers and brief, cool but quite windy winters, and mild to warm temperatures during spring and autumn. Precipitation is relatively heavy by world standards and falls throughout the year, but peaks between June and September which see twice the amount of rainy days than winter. June to September is also, while hot, cloudier than the rest of year with clear and sunny skies being most common in the autumn.

Climate data for Abbeville, Louisiana
Month	Jan	Feb	Mar	Apr	May	Jun	Jul	Aug	Sep	Oct	Nov	Dec	Year
Mean daily maximum °F (°C)	63.9 (17.7)	65.7 (18.7)	72.6 (22.6)	78.7 (25.9)	84.7 (29.3)	89.9 (32.2)	90.5 (32.5)	91.2 (32.9)	88.2 (31.2)	81.7 (27.6)	72.0 (22.2)	64.5 (18.1)	78.6 (25.9)
Mean daily minimum °F (°C)	43.2 (6.2)	45.0 (7.2)	51.8 (11.0)	58.0 (14.4)	64.4 (18.0)	70.8 (21.6)	72.3 (22.4)	72.6 (22.6)	68.1 (20.1)	57.8 (14.3)	48.8 (9.3)	43.8 (6.6)	58.1 (14.5)
Average precipitation inches (mm)	5.1 (130)	4.1 (100)	4.2 (110)	4.1 (100)	4.9 (120)	6.4 (160)	6.5 (170)	6.0 (150)	5.5 (140)	4.3 (110)	4.4 (110)	5.0 (130)	60.5 (1,540)
Source: Weatherbase

== Demographics ==
Historical population
Census	Pop.	Note	%±
1870	545		—
1880	255		−53.2%
1890	637		149.8%
1900	1,536		141.1%
1910	2,907		89.3%
1920	3,461		19.1%
1930	4,356		25.9%
1940	6,672		53.2%
1950	9,338		40.0%
1960	10,414		11.5%
1970	10,996		5.6%
1980	12,391		12.7%
1990	11,187		−9.7%
2000	11,887		6.3%
2010	12,257		3.1%
2020	11,186		−8.7%
2025 (est.)	10,861		−2.9%
U.S. Decennial Census

Abbeville racial composition as of 2020
Race	Num.	Perc.
White (non-Hispanic)	4,970	44.43%
Black or African American (non-Hispanic)	4,732	42.3%
Native American	39	0.35%
Asian	613	5.48%
Other/Mixed	392	3.5%
Hispanic or Latino	440	3.93%

Abbeville is the principal city of the Abbeville micropolitan statistical area, which includes all of Vermilion Parish, also part of the Lafayette metropolitan statistical area and the larger Lafayette–Acadiana combined statistical area.

According to the 2000 U.S. census, there were 11,887 people, 4,698 households, and 3,014 families residing in the city. The population density was 2,027.7 inhabitants per square mile (782.9/km^{2}). There were 5,257 housing units at an average density of 907.3 per square mile (350.3/km^{2}). At the 2020 population estimates program, 11,927 people lived in the city. By the publication of the 2020 United States census, there were 11,186 people, 4,761 households, and 2,752 families residing in the city.

In 2000, the racial and ethnic makeup was 54.29% White, 38.56% African American, 0.19% Native American, 5.50% Asian, 0.39% other races, and 1.06% two or more races. Hispanic or Latino Americans of any race were 1.93% of the population. In 2000, 76.0% of the population over the age of five spoke English at home, 16.5% of the population spoke French or Cajun, and 5.5% spoke Vietnamese. The 2019 American Community Survey estimated the racial and ethnic makeup was 49.6% non-Hispanic white, 42.8% African American, 0.5% Native American, 4.8% Asian, 0.9% some other race, and 1.3% two or more races.

The 2010 U.S. census reported there were 4,698 households, of which 60.34% had children under the age of 18 present, 33.35% were married couples living together, 24.44% had a female householder with no husband present, and 36.72% were non-families; 31.55% of all households were made up of individuals, and 12.32% had someone living alone who was 65 years of age or older. The average household size was 2.53 and the average family size was 3.20.

In 2019, the median household income was $38,900. Males had a median income of $46,182 versus $37,958 for females; approximately 30.4% of the population lived at or below the poverty line.

== Economy ==
Abbeville is an agricultural trade and processing center for rice, sugarcane, dairy products, locally sold corn, cotton, and seafood, in particular crawfish, alligator, and crab. The oil and natural gas fields off the coast in the Gulf of Mexico are serviced by companies throughout the region including Abbeville. Chemical products and consumer goods are manufactured locally. A related tourist attraction is a large open-kettle sugarcane syrup mill.

== Education ==
The city of Abbeville is served by the Vermilion Parish School District. The following are public and parochial schools in Abbeville:

- Elementary Schools
  - Eaton Park Elementary
  - Herod Elementary
  - Mount Carmel Elementary School (Parochial) (Grades PK–8)
- Middle Schools
  - J.H. Williams Middle School
- High Schools
  - Abbeville High School
  - Vermilion Catholic High School (Parochial)
  - Lighthouse Christian Prep. (Parochial)
  - James A. Herod High School and Elementary School (founded by Reverend James A. Herod for the education of the black population of Vermilion Parish with grades first thru twelfth, he was also a teacher)

== Recreation ==
Abbeville is home to several festivals:

- Daylily Festival and Garden Show
- Giant Omelette Celebration
- Les Lumieres du Village d'Abbeville
- Louisiana Cattle Festival
- Vermilion Carousel of Arts

The Abbey Players' Theater is a prominent local playhouse in Abbeville. The Acadian Museum is east of the city in nearby Erath, Louisiana. Avery Island, which contains a bird sanctuary, salt dome, and world-famous Tabasco factory is 15 miles southeast of the city.

== Historic buildings ==
Abbeville is the home of numerous historic buildings that have been added periodically to the National Historic Register. Starting in 1987, the Abbeville Commercial Historic District, in the area surrounded by Concord, State, Lafayette, and Jefferson Streets, was added to the register. That same year, the Abbeville Residential Historic District was created between W. Oak, State, Cherry, and the Vermilion River. St. Mary Magdalen Church, Rectory, and the Cemetery were added the following year. In the 1990s, the Ovide Broussard House, Chauviere House, Gordy House, Lyons House, and the Caldwell House were all added, in addition to the Downtown Abbeville Historic District, which is bounded by State, 1st, Pere Megret, and Concord St and the Vermilion Bayou. Finally, just before the turn of the century, the Richard Cattle Auction Barn and the St. Mary Congregational Church were both added. North of Abbeville, A La Bonne Veillee was added in 1984.

== National Guard ==
Abbeville is the home of HHC (headquarters company), 2nd Battalion, 156th Infantry (mech.), of the Louisiana Army National Guard. The 2nd Battalion served with the 256th Infantry Brigade ("The Tiger Brigade") during Operation Iraqi Freedom in 2004–2005.

== Transportation ==
The Louisiana & Delta Railroad has a route through the city, which helped bring freight produced locally to market.

The Freshwater Bayou Deepwater Channel connects Abbeville to the Gulf of Mexico, and the Intracoastal Waterway runs south of the city.

== Films ==
The 1988 remake of the 1958 film The Blob was filmed in Abbeville.

Part of Lucio Fulci's Door to Silence takes place in Abbeville.

Robert J. Flaherty chose Abbeville in 1948 as his base of operations during the filming of Louisiana Story. He rented a house in the current downtown area for 15 months over 1946–47.

In 1990, part of the film Sleeping with the Enemy, starring Julia Roberts, was shot in Abbeville.

Abbeville is one of the main locations in the first season of the HBO TV series True Detective.

== Notable people ==
- George A. Caldwell (1892–1966), building contractor convicted in the Louisiana Hayride scandals of 1939-1940.
- Bobby Duhon, (born 1946), professional American football player.
- Bobby Charles Guidry, songwriter and musician, wrote See You Later Alligator & Walking to New Orleans
- Koryn Hawthorne (born 1997), contestant and finalist on the season 8 of The Voice
- Sammy Kershaw, (born 1958), a country music artist, born in nearby Kaplan, resides in Abbeville.
- Dudley J. LeBlanc, (1894–1971), businessman / politician who made a fortune in the 1950s in the patent medicine Hadacol
- Anthony Levine, (born 1987), professional American football player; born in Abbeville.
- Gerald Long, (born 1944), state senator from Natchitoches; formerly resided in Abbeville
- Brandon Mitchell, (born 1975), former professional American football player; born in Abbeville.
- George Petty (1894–1975), pin-up artist; born in Abbeville.
- Deb Richard, (born 1963), golfer, winner of five LPGA Tour tournaments.
- Sam H. Theriot (born 1954), member of the Louisiana House of Representatives from 1979 to 1996
- Golden J. Zenon Jr. (1929–2006), architect; born in Abbeville.
- Howard M. Landry (born 1967), famous Acadian Ambulance Dispatch Supervisor & MLB Player born in Abbeville.
