= South Terrebonne High School =

Location
- 3879 La. Hwy. 24; Bourg, Louisiana; United States; 29.56444°N 90.64083°W

Information
- Type: Public secondary
- Established: 1961
- School district: Terrebonne
- Principal: Madge Gautreaux
- Faculty: 54.00 (FTE)
- Grades: 9 - 12
- Enrollment: 951 (2023-2024)
- Student to teacher ratio: 17.61
- Colors: Green and black
- Mascot: Gators
- Rival: Terrebonne High School; Ellender Memorial High School; South Lafourche High School
- Newspaper: Gator Tales
- Yearbook: Notre Temps (Our Times)
- Website: www.tpsd.org/schools/sth/index

South Terrebonne High School is a public secondary school in Bourg, Louisiana, United States. It is a part of the Terrebonne Parish School District.

South Terrebonne High currently serves the coastal communities of Bourg, Chauvin, Montegut, Pointe-aux-Chenes, and the southeastern part of incorporated Houma in Terrebonne Parish, Louisiana.

== History ==
It was the second high school built in Terrebonne Parish after the parish's first high school, Terrebonne High School, became overcrowded with an influx of students from the lower areas of the parish. In 1910, Bourg Agricultural High School was established but closed in 1924 when the consolidated school system was put in place.

The school was designed by the architectural firm Curtis and Davis Architects and Engineers, which later designed the Superdome in New Orleans.

South Terrebonne High was officially opened in 1961, with the first graduating class commencing in 1962. The first principal, Kenneth J. Walker, died of a heart attack just months after the school opened. Most of the first graduating class were transferred to South Terrebonne for their senior year when the district was reapportioned, and some students delayed their graduation from Terrebonne High in 1961 to graduate in the first graduating class at the new school in 1962.

In 1968 Southdown High School (originally Houma Colored High School), which educated black students in Terrebonne Parish, closed. Students were moved to South Terrebonne High and Terrebonne High School.

The school housed students from grades 8-12 when it first opened in 1961. As the population grew more in the southern part of the parish, causing more feeder schools to be built and open, eventually, South Terrebonne would only house students in their sophomore, junior, or senior year by 1988. Once Ellender Memorial High School, itself a feeder school to South Terrebonne, was expanded from a junior high school to become the parish's fourth high school, freshmen were then reestablished to South Terrebonne. Today, the school houses over 1,000 students in grades 9-12, with 8th graders added in special education or advanced gifted classes.

From 2015 to 2016 the Louisiana State Department of Education score for this school increased from 88.8 to 108, meaning the ranking improved to an "A" level.

On August 29, 2021, the landfall of Hurricane Ida on the Louisiana coast caused significant damage to the South Terrebonne campus. For the remainder of the 2021-2022 school year, South Terrebonne students attended H.L. Bourgeois High School in Gray under a afternoon flex schedule. A temporary modular campus at South Terrebonne would be constructed on the western lawn in front of the school, while reconstruction and renovation is underway on the main buildings. Renovation is expected to be complete by the 2025-2026 school year.

Furthermore, Lacache Middle School in Chauvin, also damaged by Hurricane Ida, was relocated to its own temporary modular campus in the student parking lot of South Terrebonne. A new middle school, proposed to be named South Terrebonne Middle School, will be constructed just north of the high school. Students from Lacache will merge with Montegut Middle School into one feeder middle school, expected to open in the 2027-2028 school year.

== Athletics ==
Since 1961, the South Terrebonne High School Gators have competed mainly in Class AAAA (4A) —one of the highest competitive levels in the LHSAA. The program is defined by long-term stability, multi-sport participation, and a consistent presence in regional and state competition boasting State Championship caliber teams throughout its history.

The Gator's field varsity, junior varsity, and freshman teams in 13 sports.

- Baseball
- Basketball (Boys & Girls)
- Cross Country (Boys & Girls)
- Football
- Golf (Boys)
- Soccer (Boys & Girls)
- Softball
- Swimming (Boys & Girls)
- Tennis (Boys & Girls)
- Track & Field (Boys & Girls)
- Volleyball (Girls)
- Bowling (Boys & Girls)
- Powerlifting (Boys & Girls)

Notable Team Results:

=== LHSAA Div II State Champions (Class AAAA - 1991) ===
- District Championships: 6

=== Bowling ===
Boys

LHSAA Div II State Runners-up (Class AAAA - 2011, 2025)

- District Championships: (2011)

=== Soccer ===
Boys

LHSAA Division II State Runner-up (Class AAAA - 2002)

- District Championships 2 (1992, 2000)
- District Runner-up 3 (1999, 2001, 2002)
- Notable Players: Clay Duplantis, Adam Sanders

=== Softball ===
- District Championships: 6

=== Swimming ===
Individual Boys

LHSAA State Championships: 4

(100 yd Backstroke - 2002, 2003, 2004) (100 yd Breaststroke - 2004)

=== Tennis ===
Boys

- District Championships: 4 (1980, 1982, 1986, 1995)
- Notable Players: Ron Cox Jr, Landon LeBouef, Joeby Luke

Girls

- District Championships: 4 (1982, 1984, 1989, 1994)
- Regional Championships: 3 (1982, 1983, 1984)

=== Track & Field ===
Boys

LHSAA State Champions: (Class AAAA - 1973)

- Regional Championships: 4 (1976, 1979, 2002, 2003)
- District Championships: 9 (1965, 1966, 1967, 1973, 1975, 1979, 1981, 2002, 2003, 2012)
- Terrebonne Parish Championships: 7 (1966, 1975, 1976, 1979, 1983, 2002, 2003, 2008, 2009, 2011)

Girls

- District Championships: 7 (2014,2013,1979, 1985, 1994, 1995, 1996)
- Terrebonne Parish Championships: 6 (1981, 1982, 1985, 1993, 1995, 1996)

=== School rivalries ===
- Terrebonne High School - Since 1961, when athletics began at South Terrebonne, it has continued to be the oldest living intra-parish rivalry. The schools are both known for their intense "dislike" for one another, on and off the fields of play.
- Ellender Memorial High School - This became most recent rivalry, especially in football, when Ellender became a high school in 1988. Both schools share a common football field located at South Terrebonne's campus. South Terrebonne has dominated Ellender since 1996, and has only lost two games to Ellender since then. Also, each school's student body competes in the "Battle for the Spirit Stick", where students purchase construction paper chain links in each schools colors to adorn the stadium on game night. The school who sells the most links maintains the Spirit Stick until the following year. This is where the South Terrebonne's tradition of "Camo-Day" originated. Each South Terrebonne/Ellender football game the students at South Terrebonne High School dress in their camouflage clothing, paint their faces, and decorate the school with a swamp theme. Both schools have pep rallies for this occasion that show the "special" rivalry between the two schools.
- South Lafourche High School - This is the lesser-advertised rivalry in the area. Both are the southernmost high schools in their respective parishes. Each school has a history of surprising wins and devastating losses to the other in many sports. The rivalry is further fueled by each school's fan base, where old-fashioned "in your face" mockery is steeped in the area's Cajun culture.

== Notable alumni ==
- Norby Chabert (Class of 1994), state senator from Terrebonne and Lafourche parishes since 2009
- Troy Johnson (Class of 1979), NFL wide receiver
- Phillip Livas (Class of 2007), NFL wide receiver from 2011-2012
- Clarence Verdin (Class of 1979), NFL wide receiver
- Mr. Augustus G. Brown Sr (Vice Principal 1971) Pilot in the legendary Tuskegee Airmen in WWII
