= United Houma Nation =

State-recognized tribe and non-profit organization in Louisiana

United Houma Nation, Inc.
- Named after: Houma people
- Formation: 1977 (state-recognized tribe), 1979 (nonprofit)
- Type: 501(c)(3) organization
- Tax ID no.: EIN 72-0742264
- Legal status: active
- Purpose: P84: Ethnic, Immigrant Centers and Services
- Headquarters: Houma, Louisiana
- Location: United States
- Members: 19,000+
- Official language: English
- Chief: Lora Ann Chaisson
- Revenue: $2,646,989 (2023)
- Expenses: $1,319,938 (2023)
- Staff: 17 (2023)
- Website: unitedhoumanation.org

The United Houma Nation, Inc. is a state-recognized tribe and non-profit organization in Louisiana. It is one of the largest state-recognized tribes in the United States, with over 19,000 members. It is not a federally recognized American Indian tribe.

== History ==
Ancestors of the United Houma Nation (UHN) began moving to Terrebonne Parish in the 1780s, they coalesced into a distinct community on Bayou Terrebonne between 1810 and 1830. These ancestors were ethnically French, Acadian, German, African and Native American. Since the 20th century, the ancestors of the UHN have generally been reported as a “mixed blood” Indigenous community in literature by scholars such as Fred Kniffen, Edison Roy, and Ann Fischer. Researchers noted they identified as Houma people, but assumed descent from several tribes, including the Choctaw, Biloxi, Chitimacha, Acolapissa and Chawasha.

=== 19th century ===
Early ancestors of the UHN began settling along Bayou Terrebonne between 1790 and 1820. The three founding families of the group are identified as the Courteau, Billiot, and Verdin families. The Courteaus were of Native American origin, the Verdins were of mixed German/French and Native American descent, and the Billiots were of African American and German origin.

In 1808, Rosalie Courteau married Jacques Billiot. The marriage has been described as central to the formation of the group. By 1820, Alexander Verdin was living with his Native American wife, Marie Gregoire, on Bayou Terrebonne. Rosalie Courteau's father was Houma Courteau, an Indigenous man. In two deeds from the 1820s, he was identified respectively as “Touh/Tough-la-bay alias Courteau of the Beloxy Nation” and “Loup La Bay called Courteau Indian of the Beloxy Nation". Courteau has also been Identified as Lacalobe, Joseph Abbe, and Shulushumon. John Swanton recorded the name Shulushomon from Houma Courteau's granddaughter Felicite Billiot. The BIA and historian Daniel Usner suggested that "Shulushomon" may have been a title meaning Red Shoes, rather than a personal name.

Rosalie Courteau's mother, Marianne Courteau, is speculated to have had Indigenous ancestry. Informants told Swanton that Marianne's name at the time of her Baptism was “Nuyu'n”, however no direct evidence confirming Native American ancestry has been identified.

==== Community expansion ====
Marie Gregoire was described as a “femme sauvage” (Native American woman) in Alexander Verdin's 1829 will. By 1820, the Verdin, Courteau, and Billiot families were living adjacent to one another along Bayou Terrebonne. From the 1820s onward, the three founding families married non-Indigenous families, including the Naquins, Chaissons, and Solets. Due to high birth rates, and out-marriage, the group continued to expand. Between 1825 and 1870, UHN ancestors moved throughout the lower bayous, founding new communities connected to their original settlement on Bayou Terrebonne.

According to UHN oral tradition, Rosalie Courteau emerged as chief of the group between 1830 and the 1880s. In the 1860 Federal census, most of the group's ancestral population were enumerated as “Indian". In 1868, a letter written by Father Denéce, first pastor of Sacred Heart Church in Montegut, described Native Americans living on the Bayous:

“I went to visit all those families who cannot come to church. These visits took me two weeks . . . to see who are in the islands neighbouring Bayou Terrebonne. The people there are not able to come to church. I go there from time to time for baptisms and communions. These are practically all decent, well-disposed Indians. I have already given communion to a good many of them. When i arrive among these people they gather [from] all the islands to attend mass i say in the house that is most suitable. The day of departure [having] come, they take great pleasure in taking me to the embarkation. They are people who have been reared among the whites on Bayou Terrebonne and one can easily see [it] by their polite ways.”

In 1892, reporter Catherine Cole of the New Orleans Daily Picayune travelled through Terrebonne Parish. Cole stated that the Houma people had previously settled in the area of the same name, but by 1892 were living in palmetto huts along the Bayous. She was informed that 336 “Indians” lived in the parish.

=== 20th century ===
United Houma Nation ancestors standing in front of a wooden building near Lake Salvador, Louisiana, in 1907. Photo taken by John Swanton.

In 1907, John Swanton visited the group. he interviewed Charles Billiot, who identified seven settlements associated with the group and provided the surnames associated with each community. the settlements he listed were Isle de Jean Charles, Point au Chien, Point au Barre, Grand Caillou, Berataria Bayou, Lafourche, and Bayou Bleu.

Much of the information Swanton obtained about Houma Courteau came from his grandson Bartholemy Billiot, who referred to Houma Courteau as Shulushumon and described him as a Biloxi medal chief.

Swanton documented that the tribe were descended from three families: the “Couteaux”, “Billiout”, and “Verdine" families. He concluded that, although the group identified as Houma, they were descended from several tribes, including the Bayogoula, and Acolapissa.

In 1917, ethnologist David Bushnell identified a major UHN settlement, Pointe-au-Chien, as Chitimacha. Bushnell's Chitimacha informant was Abel Billiot. The BIA disputed Bushnell's identification, stating that Billiot had no documentable Chitimacha ancestry. His wife, Pauline Creppel, was Rosalie Courteau's great-granddaughter. Bushnell noted that several families claimed Chitimacha descent, while acknowledging Houma ancestry.

==== Loss of land ====
Ancestors of the group outside a thatched house at Bayou Grand Caillou, Louisiana, early 20th century.

During the 1930s, the group lost much of their land to speculators and oil and gas companies. Land claims were often challenged due to missing civil marriage records, which many families lacked due to distance from population centers. Under Louisiana law at the time, children born outside of legally recognised marriages could be denied inheritance rights.

As a result of the loss of their land, UHN ancestors generally had to lease the lands they had historically been able to use freely. Their ability to create settlements on open land was further curtailed by the expansion of oil and gas companies, which leased large areas of land that were subsequently settled by Houma, white, and African American residents in segregated communities. The development of oil fields also significantly damaged the people's economic circumstances. Oyster beds became polluted, while the income they derived from trapping declined. The construction of roads into their territory to facilitate oil development also enabled outsiders to enter the area, contributing to overhunting and overfishing on lands used by the group.

Legal efforts undertaken by the group during the 20th century to recover lands lost to oil companies largely failed, with lawyers who reviewed some of the cases ultimately abandoning them.

==== Educational barriers ====
In 1916, H.L. Billiot appealed to the 20th Judicial District Court after his children were denied admission to an all-white school. Proceedings in H.L. Billiot v. Terrebonne Parish School Board began in April 1917. Billiot argued that he did not meet the definition used for the word "colored" in Louisiana, as he was of White and Native American ancestry. Billiot was an ancestor of the UHN.

Initially, the case focused on Billiot's ancestry, but later centred on the ancestry of Billiot's wife, Celesie Fredrick. Attorneys representing the School Board focused on Celesie's grandfather, Etienne ("King") Billiot Jr. They argued that the mother of Etienne Billiot Sr, Marianne Erice, was a woman of African ancestry from San Domingo. However, witnesses maintained that she was of Spanish descent.

Elderly people who had known Etienne ("King") Billiot personally were called to testify regarding his racial background, although they described him as a person of color, they avoided identifying him as African American. One witness, Taylor Beattie, provided the following testimony regarding Billiot:

"He was not black, but he was a dark colored man . . . King Billiot had in those days the reputation of claiming to be and recognized as being the King or Chief of the Houmas Tribe of Indians that settled in this portion of the State. The Houmas Tribe of Indians are a portion or sub-tribe of the Choctaws and lived on the river and in Lafourche before the Americans settled in the Country. As to whether he was the Chief of them, I know nothing."

The BIA later stated that Billiot was the son of non Indigenous parents and therefore could not be a chief, although his wife Celesie Verret was of documented Indigenous ancestry. After concluding that both H.L. Billiot and his wife were of mixed ancestry, and that his wife may have had African ancestry, the court ruled in favour of the School Board. An appeal by Billiot brought the case to the Louisiana Supreme Court, which dismissed the appeal on grounds that it lacked jurisdiction over the case.

In 1930, the Terrebonne Parish school board opened a school for the group, but questions soon arose among community members over whether it was intended to serve children of all races. Although officials stated that children of any race could attend, the absence of white children from the school led members of the community to believe that officials were attempting to assign them to a school for African Americans. As a result, parents withdrew their children from the school.

Missionary schools were subsequently established for the community and received widespread support, but struggled to accommodate the growing number of children requiring education. Some opposition to the public school also stemmed from parents who refused to send their children to school alongside other children from the community whom they considered to be of part African ancestry. The establishment of missionary schools helped resolve those tensions by providing an alternative to the public school system and allowing the community to avoid what some members regarded as an inferior educational position relative to white students.

During World War II, significant migration from the group's communities to New Orleans occurred, partially driven by employment opportunities in war-related industries such as shipbuilding. In New Orleans, many found that the racial classifications imposed in Terrebonne and Lafourche parishes had little practical relevance, and many were classified as white, and consequently able to attend schools, clubs, and other institutions designated for white people. Marriages with people from outside the community also contributed to the decline of Cajun French among the group's migrants in New Orleans.

Following World War II, The Terrebonne Parish School Board agreed to construct a school specifically for the group, The Dulac Indian School, on the condition that it be operated by the Methodist church. Construction was completed in 1953. The school only provided education up to eighth grade. As a result, those seeking further education often had to leave Terrebonne Parish, this contributed to the migration of many families to cities such as New Orleans, where they were able to access public schools and other institutions while being classified as white.

Edison Roy documented tensions surrounding members of the group whom some community members considered to have partial African ancestry. He reported that some were unhappy that those regarded as having African ancestry attended the Dulac Indian School alongside their children, with parents explaining "we feel sorry for them so we'll let them come to the school with our kids." Roy further described racial stratification within the community, stating that some families identified particular family lines as having "African blood" and told him that they did not associate with those families. He estimated that approximately 20% of the families he interviewed fell within this classification.

Some Adolescents in Dulac felt pressured to leave despite their attachment to their families and community, as they found the local school facilities and teachers generally inadequate. Among young adults who left Dulac to attend high schools and colleges, and to escape prejudice and poverty, some nevertheless expressed a desire to return, citing their attachment to their community.

In 1954, the School Board planned to integrate Native American children into white schools. The plan collapsed after white parents threatened to withdraw their children if Native American children were admitted. A high school serving the group was established in 1961.

In the 1960s, Ann Fischer had come to Terrebonne Parish to document Traiteurs, explore the forests, and collect plants used by the community. She also heard accounts from community members concerning land taken by oil companies. In 1960, Fischer wrote to LaVerne Madigan, executive director of the Association of American Indian Affairs, requesting research and legal assistance for the group. She also noted the community's limited educational opportunities.

After consulting a priest, Madigan was referred to attorney John Nelson, whom she contacted shortly afterward. Madigan established a panel that held meetings concerning the community's schools, but it dissolved in 1961 after families resisted proposals to integrate their children into African American schools.

In 1963, Nelson and Fischer visited Montegut to ask parents about enrolling their children in white schools. Nelson’s investigation found that teachers at the Indian schools often had no more than a high school diploma, while classes of 30 to 40 children spanning four grades were taught in a single classroom. Classes were regularly dismissed early and children could not take books home. He also documented parents' concerns about sending their children to white schools and accounts of discrimination against members of the community.

Nelson initially recruited four children to attempt enrollment in white schools, and that number increased to 56 within six weeks. They became plaintiffs in Naquin v. Terrebonne Parish School Board, filed on March 28, 1963, against the Terrebonne Parish School Board and Superintendent Carlton Charles Miller, seeking a permanent injunction against the segregation of 'Indian', African American, and white students based on race.

During the proceedings, Miller referred to members of the group as "so-called Indians" and "Sabines." Miller testified that officials determined whether a child was 'Indian' based on family names and physical characteristics such as skin color, rather than birth certificates, which he said were rarely used because children from the group were generally born in New Orleans hospitals, where Native Americans were classified as white. He stated that Indian schools rarely had certified teachers as they would rather teach in all-white schools, and confirmed that Indian schools had no clubs or activities.

Shortly before the school year began, Judge Christenberry ordered the admission of Native American students in the 11th and 12th grades and issued a preliminary injunction directing school administrators to submit a comprehensive plan for desegregation within a year. Nelson subsequently filed a motion asking Christenberry to reconsider the restriction to the 11th and 12th grades, as it would not immediately affect any of the plaintiffs, and the order was extended to include the 10th grade. Few students chose to integrate amid rumours that outsiders were forcing children into white schools. Former Indian school student Kirby Verret recalled teachers leading children in a chant of "one, two, three, we don't want to integrate."

The Civil Rights Act of 1964 required Terrebonne officials to open previously segregated facilities to African Americans and members of the community. Interest in the civil rights movement subsequently increased among young people and most enrolled in white schools that year. leading to most enrolling in white schools that year, By 1965, all members of the community were attending white schools. In 1968, a ruling concerning the desegregation of African American students in Terrebonne Parish schools cited Naquin v. Terrebonne Parish School Board as a precedent.

== Recognition process ==
Early efforts by the United Houma Nation to obtain federal recognition, particularly in relation to education, led to their mention in a 1931 report on Native Americans in Louisiana by the Bureau of Indian Affairs. The report followed an inquiry from Louisiana congressman Numa F. Montet, who had written to the BIA to ask what measures would be necessary for the United Houma Nation to come under federal jurisdiction on the basis of their Indigenous identity. BIA Special Commissioner Roy Nash subsequently investigated the communities and concluded that Native populations in Louisiana were too geographically dispersed to receive federal services.

Nash stated that the group largely lived in marginal settlements along the various bayous and described its members as being primarily of French and Native American ancestry. He asserted that approximately 5% were of “unmistakable African descent” and argued that their presence contributed to the group’s inability to obtain access to public education. Nash further suggested that, had the group been concentrated in a single area, the federal government might have been able to provide schools for them.

In 1932, in response to a letter from Eugene Dumez, secretary of the Houma-Terrebonne Chamber of Commerce, Assistant Commissioner of Indian Affairs J. Henry Scattergood stated that Indigenous communities in Louisiana had long been recognized locally as Native Americans. However he noted that they lacked the treaty histories, reservations and allotments that, in the view of federal authorities, indicated tribal status. Scattergood therefore stated that responsibility for providing assistance to the Indigenous communities in Louisiana rested with the state’s local authorities.

In 1938, the Indian Service sent anthropologist Ruth Underhill to investigate Indigenous communities in Louisiana. In October of that year, she visited Houma enclaves in the state. After conducting her study, Underhill recommended that federal aid be provided to the Houma; however the department of interior declined to do so, citing financial constraints. Underhill's investigation had been undertaken at the urging of anthropologist Frank Speck.

In her observations, Underhill noted that the people identified themselves as Houma and possessed extensive knowledge of their genealogy, but lacked treaties, tribal rolls and other markers that the federal government used to determine tribal status. She further stated that they were unable to attend white schools and that their families refused to send their children to black schools. Underhill also noted that the various ancestral settlements of the UHN maintained at least nominal communication with one another.

As efforts to secure federal recognition continued, Charles Billiot and David Billiot wrote letters to Frank Speck concerning federal recognition for the Houma. David Billiot described aspects of Nash’s special report that he believed were erroneous or based on misconceptions. he stated that he was familiar with events in the communities along other bayous other than his own and informed Speck that Nash had visited the communities of Grand Caillou, Petit Caillou, and the lower Bayou Terrebonne, but had not visited Point-au-Chien or Bayou Lafourche.

Billiot further argued that Nash had underestimated the number of people in the communities who had African ancestry, and attributed the group's treatment as social outcasts to the presence of Houma people with African ancestry within the communities. He stated that, because the families shared surnames, white residents wished to place them collectively within the colored category. Billiot rejected this characterization as a misrepresentation and asserted that his own family was not mixed with the families he identified as having African ancestry.

=== State recognition ===
In 1972, the Houma Tribe was formed, electing its first chairman, Frank Naquin. The organization primarily served Houma communities in the eastern portion of Terrebonne, Lafourche, and Jefferson Parishes. In 1974, members in western areas, dissatisfied with the Houma Tribe, split to form the Houma Alliance, whose primary objective was to address the economic conditions affecting Western Houma communities. The Houma obtained state recognition in 1977. In 1979, the two organizations merged to form the United Houma Nation, with the aim of strengthening their pursuit of federal recognition. Kirby Verret was the United Houma Nation's first chairman.

=== Federal recognition petition ===
The United Houma Nation petitioned for federal recognition with the Office of Federal Acknowledgment (OFA) of the Bureau of Indian Affairs (BIA) in 1979. The UHN submitted its petition in 1985. At that time, the United Houma Nation had 8715 enrolled members. Increased interest following the petition, along with a registration drive by the UHN, led to membership growth to approximately 17,000.

In 1994, the BIA published a preliminary finding that the United Houma Nation did not meet three of the seven criteria for recognition as an Indian tribe. They found no evidence that the United Houma Nation descended from any historical Indian tribe, that their ancestors did not constitute a distinct social community before 1830, and that their ancestors exercised no political influence over a community before 1830.

The BIA described the UHN as presenting a unique case, noting that the group constituted a distinct community with verifiable Native American ancestry, whose elderly members retained knowledge of words from Native American Languages into the 20th century. most of the group's ancestral settlements were identified as "Indian" in federal censuses. nevertheless the BIA concluded that the available evidence was insufficient to definitively establish the group’s descent from any single historical tribe.

The ancestors of the United Houma Nation were "primarily French, Acadian, German, and African" people who settled near Bayou Terrebonne around the 1790s. Three Native American ancestors were identified; however, their tribes affiliation could not be determined, and each moved to the settlement independently of each other. Two of these ancestors established the Courteau and Verdin family lines, while the third married into the Billiot family. These three families subsequently became the principal founding families of the group

=== Organizational factionalism and splits ===
The presumption of African ancestry in some, but not all, of the group's settlements has sometimes been cited as a factor contributing to tensions between the different communities. Conflicts also occurred between different bayous, particularly when large groups of men travelled to dance halls and clubs in other communities. These altercations were often associated with disputes over women; oral accounts recalled that in the 1950s, men from Point Barre became involved in fights at dancehalls in Dulac. Such conflicts contributed to enmity between some of the communities.

Bad blood has been described between families within the community. One individual in an account to the BIA, recalled hearing negative comments while growing up about people assumed to have African ancestry. A faction known as the Documented Houma tribe was formed within the community, this organization asserted itself to be the "true indians" and called for changes to the leadership and administration of the UHN. This organization later became the predecessor to the Biloxi-Chitimacha Confederation of Muskogees.

In January 1995, two groups separated from the UHN, taking nearly 2,000 members with them: the Biloxi-Chitimacha Confederation of Muskogees (BCCM) and the Pointe-au-Chien Indian Tribe (PACIT). In 2004, the Pointe-au-Chien Tribe gained state recognition alongside the Bayou Lafourche, Grand Caillou/Dulac, and Isle de Jean Charles Bands that constitute the BCCM. In 2008, both PACIT and the BCCM were issued negative proposed findings to their federal recognition petitions.

=== Present day ===
In 2013, the United States Bureau of Indian Affairs offered revised criteria for federal recognition. The United Houma Nation has an active petition for federal acknowledgment under 2015 criteria. The BIA is waiting for the United Houma Nation to submit further documentation.

== Cultural heritage ==
=== Language ===
A portion of John Swanton's Houma wordlist, which he recorded from Felicite (Billiot) Galley and later published in Indian tribes of the lower Mississippi Valley and Adjacent Coast of the Gulf of Mexico.

In 1907, John Swanton collected a list of 80 words from an elderly woman whom he identified as being Houma, later identified as Felicite (Billiot) Galley by the BIA. Swanton described the words as nearly identical to Choctaw.

The BIA later consulted Emanuel Drechsel, a scholar specializing in Mobilian Jargon, who stated that the documented words appeared to be either Mobilian Jargon or an incomplete form of Choctaw. Dreschel concluded that the UHN had likely spoken a different Indigenous language natively while using either Mobilian Jargon or Choctaw as a second language.

Based on this interpretation the BIA concluded that the word list represented Mobilian Jargon. Several scholars, however, have disputed this interpretation and instead identified the language as a distinct language known as Houma.

A song in the language was recorded in 1924 from Felicite Zilda (Billiot) Chaisson. in 1940, Victor Naquin the leader of Isle de Jean Charles, told a BIA visitor that his grandmother had spoken "Indian" and that based on his understanding that the language was "Houma-Choctaw."

In 1965, Anthropologist Ann Fischer documented that some members of the group could still recall numbers in their ancestral language and that they recognized a connection between the language and Choctaw.

In the early 1970s, Mennonite Missionary Greg Bowman recorded another song in the language from Elvira Molinere Billiot. In 2015, elders in the UHN could still recall words from the language, mainly relating to the environment, including “nita” (bear), “šankoló” (cypress), “santé” (snake), “okélawaféna” (water), and “sakčé” (crawfish).

==== Houma French ====
The dialect of French spoken by members of the UHN is considered to have a distinct accent in Louisiana and is known as Houma French. The ancestral language of the UHN has influenced the phonology and morpho-syntax of this dialect, its vowel and consonant patterns have been described as resembling western Muskogean languages more closely than other varieties of French spoken in Louisiana.

=== Material culture ===
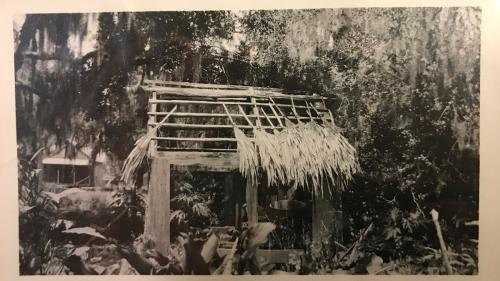
Thatched house under construction in Point Au Chien in 1907.

David Bushnell described the group's traditional houses as having palmetto-thatched roofs, with walls made of branches, saplings, clay and Spanish moss. According to Bushnell, houses could be constructed within a day, with communal labour used during construction. A particularly large house served as a meeting place for men in the village.

Bushnell also reported that the group had formerly practiced tattooing on the hands, cheeks, and neck. The tattoos were described as red and black in colour, with the pigments coming from the giant ragweed and from burned yellow pine. He further noted that the group made pottery vessels from clay, spoons from cow horns, and pirogues were made out of cypress.

He learned that bows and arrows were primarily used by elderly people, while blowguns remained in use. Janel M. Curry-Roper noted that blowguns continued to be used by this group well into the 20th century. Two distinct variants of blowgun were documented among the group. One was the southeastern blowgun, made from marsh elder and widely used among Native American tribes in Southeastern USA. The second variant, made from a split cypress stick, was identified as unique to this group within the USA. The style of blowgun dart used by the group is similar to those used by the Choctaw and Muscogee People.

A cypress blowgun was collected from Bartholemy Billiot by anthropologist M.R Harrington in 1908, the Indigenous term for the item was recorded as "ga na pa." The blowgun is currently held by the National Museum of the American Indian.

Frank Speck documented that the group had traditional healers known as “Traiteurs”, these healers provided herbal remedies and memorized prayers during treatment, they reportedly chanted while attending to a patient. He noted that, among more than 70 plants used by the group for herbal remedies, only four were of European origin.

Curry-Roper documented the use of three materials in the group's basket-making traditions: cane, cypress, and palmetto. The techniques employed included wicker, coiled, twilled and checkered basketry.

Toy mortars were made by the group as well as by the Koasati, Jena Choctaw, and Tunica-Biloxi. Members of the group also carved small cypress idols depicting kneeling men, cats, and birds. The Houma along with the Koasati, made dolls out of Spanish moss, and some dolls made by Houma artisans are displayed at the Mashantucket Pequot Museum and Research Center.

== Organization ==
The United Houma Nation incorporated as a 501(c)(3) nonprofit organization in Houma, Louisiana, in 1979. Their funders include the Ananda Fund, Common Counsel Foundation, Louisiana Endowment for the Humanities, NEO Philanthropy, and Institute of Indian Development.

=== Administration ===
The United Houma Nation Inc. established a governing body that includes a council consisting of elected representatives for each tribal district and elect a principal chief as well as a vice principal chief.

They are based in Houma, Louisiana, and their principal chief is Lora Ann Chaisson.

=== Population ===
The United Houma Nation, Inc. has the largest membership of any state-recognized tribe in Louisiana and has more members than any of the four federally recognized tribes in Louisiana. The UHN has over 19,000 members.

== Activities ==
The organization holds an annual powwow in Louisiana.

In 2024, the United Houma Nation received a $56 million federal grant for projects aimed at addressing climate change.

The United Houma Nation is currently one of the seven members of the Intertribal Council of Louisiana(ITCLA). The ITCLA is composed of 4 federally recognized tribes: the Jena Choctaw, Coushatta Tribe of Louisiana, Tunica-Biloxi, and the Chitimacha, and 3 state-recognized tribes: the UHN, Clifton Choctaw, and Choctaw-Apache Tribe of Ebarb. The Intertribal Council was founded in 1975 by the Coushatta, Chitimacha, Jena Choctaw and Houma. The Tunica-Biloxi later joined the council in 1979.

== Notable members ==
- Mariah Hernandez-Fitch, film director, writer, activist
- N. Bruce Duthu, Dean of Vermont School of Law
- R.J. Molinere, TV personality, Swamp People

== See also ==
- Houma people
- State-recognized tribes in the United States
- Biloxi-Chitimacha Confederation of Muskogees
- Biloxi people
- Chitimacha tribe
- Pointe-au-Chien Indian Tribe

== Bibliography ==
- Miller, Mark Edwin (2004). Forgotten Tribes: Unrecognised Indians and the Federal Acknowledgement Process. University of Nebraska Press.
- D'Oney, J. Daniel (2020). A Kingdom of Water: Adaption and Survival in the Houma Nation. University of Nebraska Press.
- Summary under the Criteria and Evidence for proposed Finding against Federal Acknowledgement for the United Houma Nation, Inc (PDF) (Report). Washington D.C: United States Department of the Interior. 1994.
- Roy, Edison Peter (1959). The Indians of Dulac: A Descriptive Study of a Racial Hybrid Community in Terrebonne Parish, Louisiana (Science thesis). LSU Historical dissertations and Theses.
