= Biloxi-Chitimacha Confederation of Muskogees =

Alliance of three state-recognized tribes in Louisiana

Biloxi-Chitimacha Confederation of Muskogees, Inc.
- Abbreviation: BCCM
- Formation: 1995
- Type: Alliance of state-recognized tribes, 501(c)(3) organization
- Legal status: active
- Location: United States
- Members: 2,545 (2008)
- Website: www.biloxi-chitimacha.com

The Biloxi-Chitimacha Confederation of Muskogees, Inc. (BCCM) is a confederation of three state-recognized tribes, the Bayou Lafourche Band, the Grand Caillou/Dulac Band and the Isle de Jean Charles band. The organization is based in Terrebonne and Lafourche Parishes in Louisiana.

The organization identifies its members as descending from five historical tribes: the Biloxi, Choctaw, Atakapa, Chitimacha and Acolapissa.

== History ==
In January 1995, the Biloxi-Chitimacha Confederation of Muskogees and the Pointe-au-Chien Indian Tribe split from the United Houma Nation.

The BCCM and the Pointe-au-Chien Indian Tribe received state recognition in 2004. In 2008, the BCCM received a negative proposed finding from the Bureau of Indian Affairs. The BIA concluded that the group had failed to satisfy criteria 83.7(b), 83.7(c), 83.7(d), and 83.7(e), stating that sufficient evidence had not been provided to demonstrate continuous existence of the group from historical times to the present. The BIA also stated that the organization had not submitted a governing document and that the group's grand council had not certified the membership lists submitted by its three bands.

== Environmental displacement ==
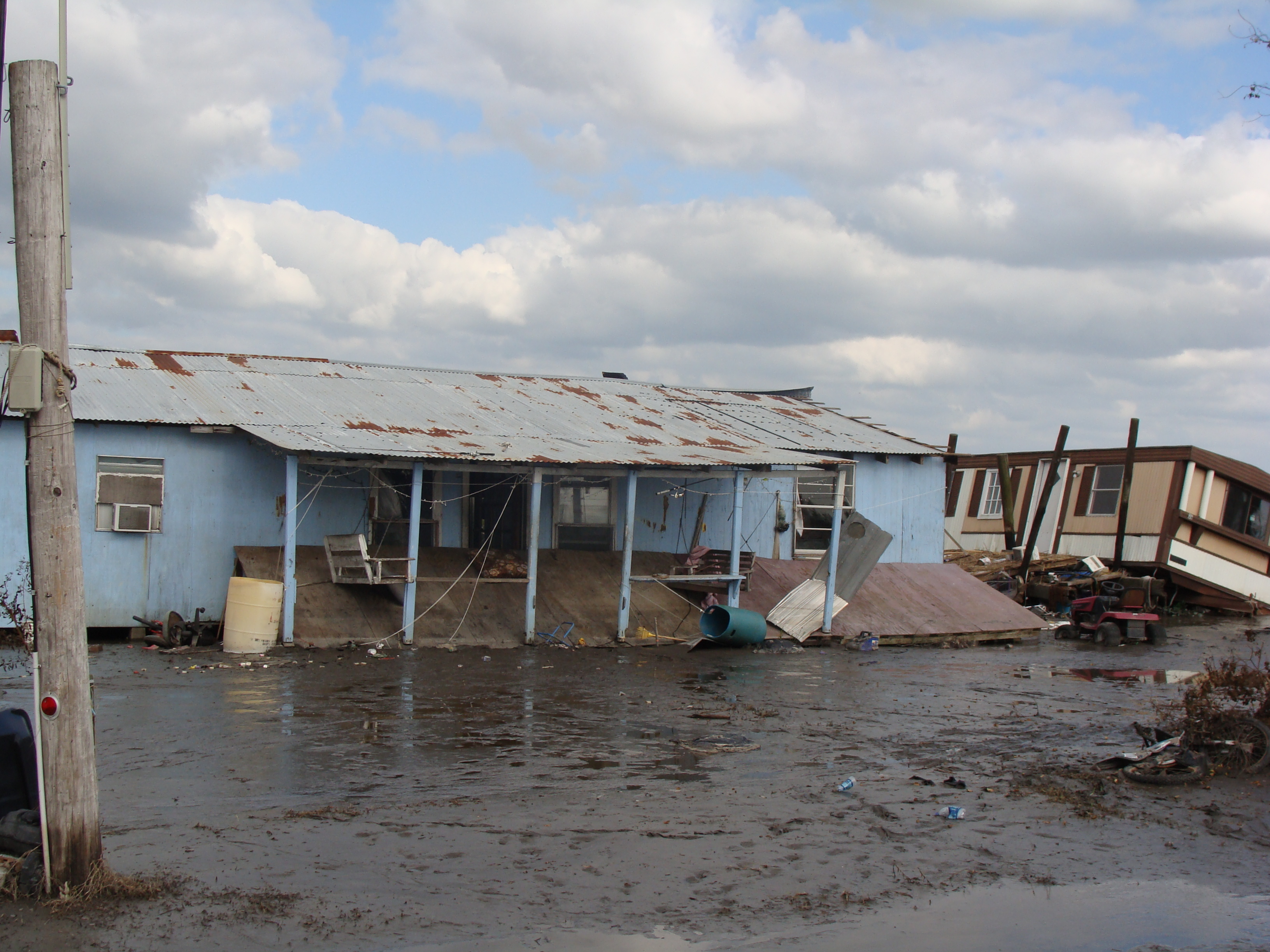
Isle de Jean Charles after hurricane Gustav.

Isle de Jean Charles, the home of the Isle de Jean Charles Band, has lost 98% of its land due to coastal erosion, while hurricanes have caused extensive damage to the island. In 2016, Chief Albert Naquin advocated for the band to apply for the National Disaster Resilience Competition, a joint project between the Louisiana state government and federal government intended to assist communities affected by climate change. Following consultation with residents, a resettlement plan was developed and residents were moved to a new island.

== Organization ==
The three bands of the BCCM each maintain their own governing document and council of elders. As state-recognized tribes, the Bayou Lafourche Band, the Isle de Jean Charles Band, and Grand Caillou/Dulac Band are also non-profit organizations.

=== Grand Caillou Dulac Band ===
Since 2022, the chief of the Grand Caillou/Dulac Band has been Devon Parfait. According to the organization, the position is hereditary and was passed to him from his cousin Shirell Parfait-Dardar.

=== Isle de Jean Charles Band ===
Since 1997, Albert Naquin has served as chief of the Isle de Jean Charles Band.

=== Bayou Lafourche Band ===
Quincy Verdun serves as chief of the Bayou Lafourche Band.
