= H. L. Bourgeois High School =

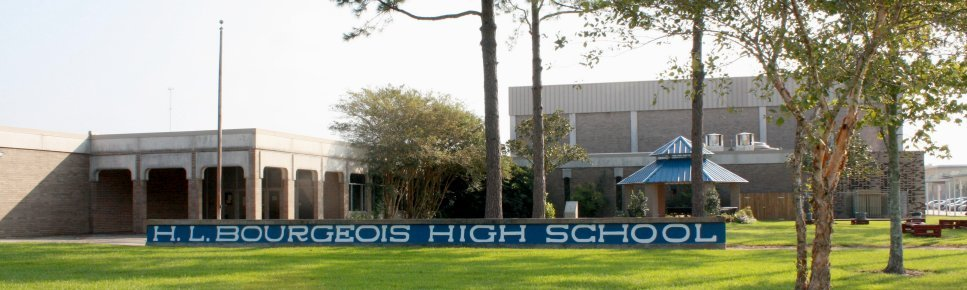

Location
- 1 Reservation Court; Gray, Louisiana 70359; United States; 29.675°N 90.7768°W

Information
- School type: public high school
- Motto: It's a Matter of Pride!
- Established: 1973
- School district: Terrebonne Parish School District
- Principal: Casannah Moses
- Teaching staff: 82.46 (FTE)
- Grades: 9–12
- Enrollment: 1,340 (2023-2024)
- Student to teacher ratio: 16.25
- Hours in school day: 7
- Campus type: Suburb/rural
- Colours: Blue & gray
- Fight song: "Cherokee"
- Mascot: Brave
- Nickname: Braves
- Newspaper: Smoke Signals (ceased)
- Yearbook: Calumet
- Feeder schools: Evergreen Junior High
- Website: www.tpsd.org/schools/hlb/index

H. L. Bourgeois High School is a public high school in Gray, Louisiana, United States and one of four traditional high schools in the Terrebonne Parish School District. The school is named after Henry Louis Bourgeois, an educator who served as superintendent of the school district from 1914 to 1955. Built in response to a rising population at Terrebonne High School, the school opened in 1973 and was first accredited by the Southern Association of Colleges and Schools in 1975. For its first 40 years, HLB primarily served students in grades 10–12. For the 2013–2014 school year, an all-new Freshman Center was completed to serve ninth-grade students. Prior to this, freshman students were housed at nearby Evergreen Junior High School.

The school serves the communities of Gray, Schriever, Gibson, Donner, and Chacahoula, as well as parts of Houma and Thibodaux.

== Athletics ==
The school is classified as 5A in the Louisiana High School Athletic Association and competes in several sports:

- Baseball
- Basketball (girls and boys)
- Bowling (girls and boys)
- Cheerleading (non-sanctioned)
- Cross Country (girls and boys)
- Football
- Golf
- Powerlifting (girls and boys)
- Raindancers (dance team)
- Soccer (girls and boys)
- Softball
- Swimming (girls and boys)
- Tennis (girls and boys)
- Track and Field (girls and boys)
- Volleyball (girls and boys)

== Principals ==
- L. P. Bordelon III (1973–1980)
- Luther Fletcher (1980–1994)
- Nolan Harris (1994–1997)
- Sherry Jones (1997–2004)
- Nason Authement (2004–2010)
- Bridget Olivier (2010–2013)
- Matthew Hodson (2013–2022)
- Casannah Moses (2022–present)

== Notable alumni ==
- Beryl Amedee (1982), state representative for District 51, based in Houma, since 2016
- "Bubba" (1990), co-host of nationally syndicated radio talk show Big D and Bubba
- LTG Dana K. Chipman (1976), West Point graduate and Judge Advocate General of the US Army
- JaJuan Dawson (1995), NFL wide receiver for the Cleveland Browns, Houston Texans, and Indianapolis Colts
- Jesse Myles (1979), former NFL running back for the Denver Broncos
- Brady Vilcan (1988) and Vicky Vilcan (1987), contestants on the sixth season of the NBC's The Biggest Loser
