= EPAC =

EPAC may refer to:

- rap guanine nucleotide exchange factor 3 (RAPGEF3), also known as exchange factor directly activated by cAMP 1 (EPAC1) or cAMP-regulated guanine nucleotide exchange factor
- Electrically Power Assisted Cycle, a term used in EU regulations for E-bikes
- Eastern Pacific Ocean Hurricane basin
- École Pointe-au-Chien
