= Tristan Leigh =

American football player (born 2003)

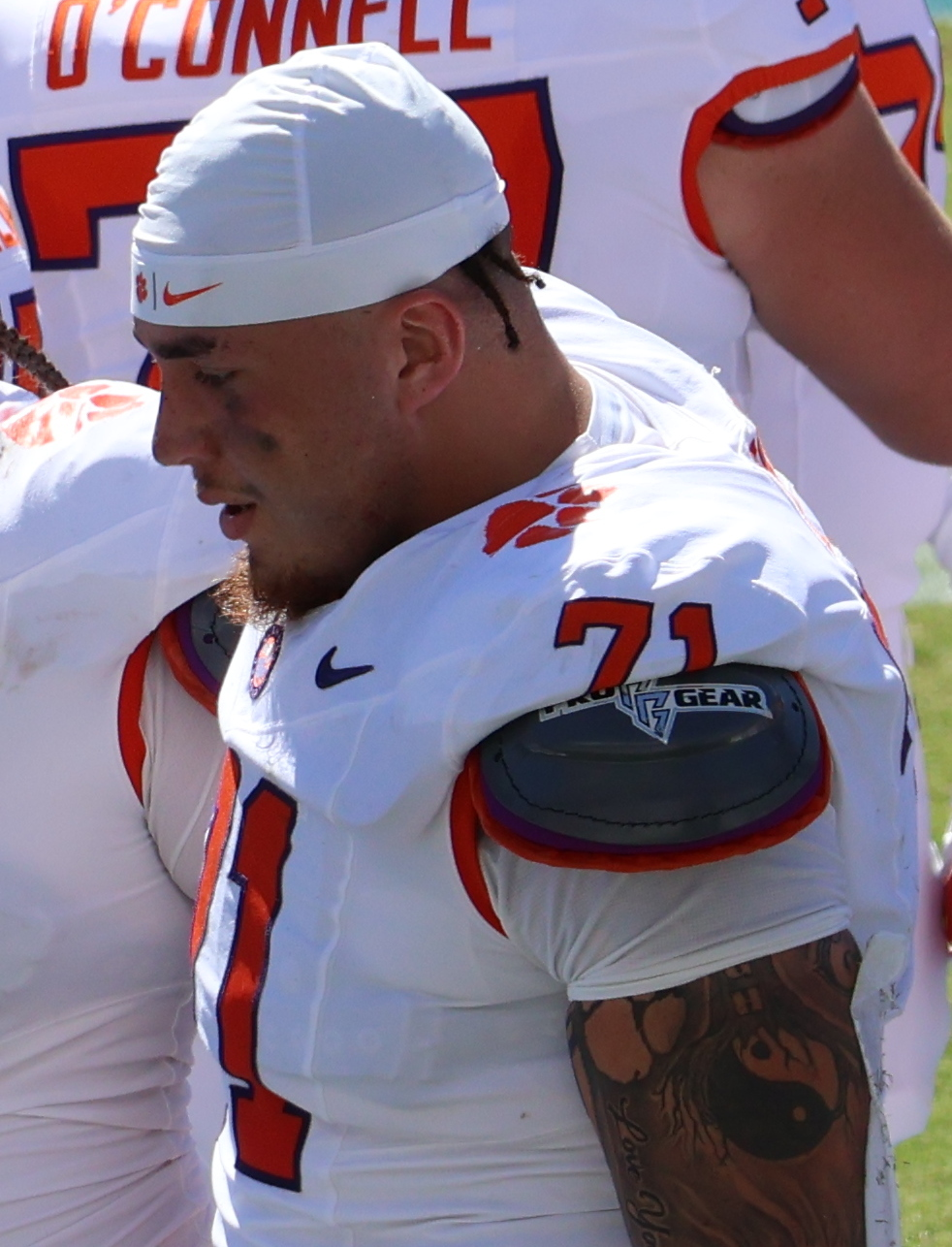
- Leigh with the Clemson Tigers in 2025

DC Defenders
- Position: Offensive tackle
- Roster status: Unsigned draft pick

Personal information
- Born: April 28, 2003 (age 23); Fairfax, Virginia, U.S.
- Listed height: 6 ft 5 in (1.96 m)
- Listed weight: 312 lb (142 kg)

Career information
- High school: Robinson (Fairfax)
- College: Clemson (2021–2025)
- NFL draft: 2026: undrafted

Career history
- Minnesota Vikings (2026)*; DC Defenders (2027-present)
- * Offseason or practice squad member only
- Stats at Pro Football Reference

Tristan Leigh (born April 28, 2003) is an American professional football offensive tackle. He played college football for the Clemson Tigers and he was signed as an undrafted free agent by the Minnesota Vikings in 2026.

== Early life ==
Leigh was born on April 28, 2003, and grew up in Fairfax, Virginia. He grew up playing soccer and basketball, later starting to play football after his mother initially was unwilling to let him. He attended Robinson Secondary School in Fairfax where he played football and was a top offensive tackle, receiving his first scholarship offer in January 2019. He was named first-team All-DMV by NBC Sports Washington and the Virginia High School Player of the Year. He was invited to the Polynesian Bowl and the All-American Bowl. A five-star recruit and one of the top 15 overall players in the 2021 recruiting class, he committed to play college football for the Clemson Tigers.

== College career ==
As a freshman for the Tigers in 2021, Leigh redshirted and appeared in two games. He appeared in five games the following season. He won a starting role in 2023, appearing in 13 games while starting 11. He then started 12 games during the 2024 season and helped Clemson win the Atlantic Coast Conference (ACC) Championship Game. He announced a return for a final season in 2025.

== Professional career ==
Pre-draft measurables
| Height | Weight | Arm length | Hand span | Wingspan | 20-yard shuttle | Three-cone drill | Vertical jump | Broad jump | Bench press |
|---|---|---|---|---|---|---|---|---|---|
| 6 ft 4 5/8 in (1.95 m) | 314 lb (142 kg) | 34 3/8 in (0.87 m) | 9 1/2 in (0.24 m) | 7 ft 0 3/8 in (2.14 m) | 5.00 s | 7.98 s | 26.0 in (0.66 m) | 8 ft 7 in (2.62 m) | 16 reps |
All values from Pro Day

=== Minnesota Vikings ===
Leigh was signed as an undrafted free agent by the Minnesota Vikings after the conclusion of the 2026 NFL draft. On August 30, 2026, he was waived by the Vikings as a part of final roster cuts. Leigh was re–signed to the Vikings' practice squad the next day. Minnesota waived Leigh from the practice squad on September 2. On October 6, he was re-signed to the Vikings practice squad. On October 23, he was released from the practice squad.
