= 2021 college football recruiting class =

Recruiting of students for US college football

The college football recruiting class of 2021 refers to the recruiting of high school athletes to play college football starting in the fall of 2021. The scope of this article covers: (a) the colleges and universities with recruiting classes ranking among the top 20 in the country as assessed by at least one of the major media companies, and (b) the individual recruits ranking among the top 20 in the country as assessed by at least one of the major media companies.

The Alabama Crimson Tide, led by head coach Nick Saban, had the top recruiting class according to Rivals.com, 247Sports, and On3. Ohio State was ranked second by all three services.

Media outlets disagreed over who was the nation's top recruit. Rivals.com and 247Sports selected quarterback Quinn Ewers as the No. 1 recruit. Ewers committed to Ohio State but later transferred to Texas. Defensive end Jack Sawyer was selected as the No. 1 recruit by ESPN and also committed to Ohio State. Defensive end Korey Foreman was selected as the No. 1 recruit by the USA Today and committed to USC.

== Top ranked classes ==
| School | Rivals | 247 | On3 |
|---|---|---|---|
| Alabama | 1 | 1 | 1 |
| Ohio State | 2 | 2 | 2 |
| Oregon | 3 | 6 | 6 |
| LSU | 4 | 3 | 5 |
| Georgia | 5 | 4 | 3 |
| Clemson | 6 | 5 | 4 |
| Texas A&M | 7 | 8 | 7 |
| USC | 8 | 7 | 8 |
| Notre Dame | 9 | 9 | 11 |
| Florida | 10 | 12 | 13 |
| Michigan | 11 | 13 | 14 |
| Miami | 12 | 11 | 10 |
| Oklahoma | 13 | 10 | 9 |
| Wisconsin | 14 | 16 | 17 |
| North Carolina | 15 | 14 | 12 |
| Texas | 16 | 15 | 16 |
| Ole Miss | 17 | 17 | 19 |
| Nebraska | 18 | 20 | 24 |
| Missouri | 19 | 27 | 28 |
| Maryland | 20 | 18 | 25 |
| Auburn | 22 | 19 | 22 |
| Penn State | 25 | 21 | 18 |
| Florida State | 27 | 23 | 20 |
| Jackson State | | | 15 |

== Top ranked recruits ==
| Player | Position | School | ESPN | Rivals | USA Today | 247Sports |
|---|---|---|---|---|---|---|
| Quinn Ewers | Quarterback | Ohio State (Texas transfer) | 3 | 1 | | 1 |
| Jack Sawyer | Defensive end | Ohio State | 1 | 12 | 3 | 5 |
| Korey Foreman | Defensive end | USC | 4 | 4 | 1 | 2 |
| Tommy Brockermeyer | Offensive tackle | Alabama | 2 | 9 | 4 | 6 |
| Maason Smith | Defensive tackle | LSU | 58 | 2 | 23 | 20 |
| JT Tuimoloau | Defensive end | Ohio State | 5 | 7 | 2 | 4 |
| JC Latham | Offensive tackle | Alabama | 6 | 3 | 7 | 3 |
| Caleb Williams | Quarterback | Oklahoma (USC transfer) | 17 | 6 | 5 | 7 |
| Amarius Mims | Offensive tackle | Georgia | 21 | 5 | 6 | 8 |
| Leonard Taylor III | Defensive tackle | Miami | 7 | 41 | 11 | 11 |
| Jeremiah Trotter Jr. | Linebacker | Clemson | 8 | 89 | | 37 |
| Brock Vandagriff | Quarterback | Georgia | 38 | 8 | 12 | 17 |
| Sam Huard | Quarterback | Washington (Cal Poly transfer) | 16 | 17 | 8 | 12 |
| Keeshawn Silver | Defensive end | North Carolina | 9 | 88 | | 31 |
| Dallas Turner | Linebacker | Alabama | 13 | 19 | | 9 |
| TreVeyon Henderson | Running back | Ohio State | 10 | 81 | | 23 |
| Ty Thompson | Quarterback | Oregon | 68 | 10 | | 40 |
| Terrence Lewis | Linebacker | Maryland | 11 | 30 | 14 | 21 |
| Emeka Egbuka | Wide receiver | Ohio State | 31 | 11 | 9 | 10 |
| Smael Mondon | Athlete | Georgia | 12 | 97 | | 35 |
| Donovan Jackson | Offensive guard | Ohio State | 71 | 13 | | 19 |
| Ja'Tavion Sanders | Athlete | Texas | 14 | 14 | 21 | 13 |
| James Williams | Safety | Miami | 36 | 20 | 13 | 15 |
| Tristan Leigh | Offensive tackle | Clemson | 25 | 27 | 10 | 14 |
| Shemar Turner | Defensive end | Texas A&M | 15 | 32 | | 22 |
| Bryce Foster | Offensive guard | Texas A&M | 147 | 15 | | |
| Mario Williams Jr. | Wide receiver | Oklahoma (USC transfer) | 18 | 16 | 15 | 43 |
| Camar Wheaton | Running back | Alabama | 44 | | 16 | 34 |
| Nolan Rucci | Offensive tackle | Wisconsin | 37 | 18 | 18 | 16 |
| J. J. McCarthy | Quarterback | Michigan | 26 | | 17 | 25 |
| Damon Payne | Defensive tackle | Alabama | 27 | | 18 | 24 |
| Kyle McCord | Quarterback | Ohio State | 32 | | 18 | 28 |
| Kool-Aid McKinstry | Cornerback | Alabama | 41 | | | 18 |
| Dylan Brooks | Defensive end | Auburn | 19 | 124 | | |
| Jaxson Dart | Quarterback | USC (Ole Miss transfer) | 20 | 107 | | |
