= Damon Payne =

American football player (born 2003)

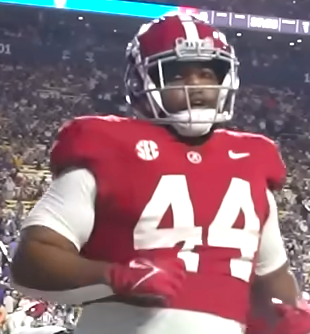
- Payne with the Alabama Crimson Tide in 2024

Profile
- Position: Defensive tackle

Personal information
- Born: April 15, 2003 (age 23)
- Listed height: 6 ft 3 in (1.91 m)
- Listed weight: 308 lb (140 kg)

Career information
- High school: Belleville (Belleville, Michigan)
- College: Alabama (2021–2024); Michigan (2025)
- NFL draft: 2026: undrafted

Career history
- Kansas City Chiefs (2026)*
- * Offseason or practice squad member only

Damon Lamont Payne Jr. (born April 15, 2003) is an American football defensive tackle. He played college football for the Alabama Crimson Tide and the Michigan Wolverines. Payne was signed by the Kansas City Chiefs as an undrafted free agent in 2026.

== Early life ==
Payne was born on April 15, 2003, and attended Belleville High School in Belleville, Michigan. He played prep football and was ranked as the No. 39 overall player in the country in the 2021 college football recruiting class by 247Sports, holding offers from Michigan, Ohio State, LSU, Alabama, Oregon, USC, Penn State and Oklahoma. Payne committed to play college football for Nick Saban and Alabama in July 2020.

== College career ==
=== Alabama ===
In 2021, Payne enrolled at the University of Alabama and used his freshman year to redshirt. From 2022 to 2024, he had 30 tackles with a half sack. Alabama defensive line coach Freddie Roach in December 2024 said: "Payne's done a really good job; he's improved a lot. He played some last year, is playing a good amount this year and we look forward to watching him play even more. He works his butt off. He's really good kid, mature kid, who helps the young guys out." After his senior season, he entered the NCAA transfer portal.

=== Michigan ===
In December 2024, Payne transferred to his home-state to attend the University of Michigan, playing for the Wolverines in his final season.

=== College statistics ===
Year	Team	Games	Tackles				
Year	Team	GP	Solo	Ast	Comb	TFL	Sacks
2022	Alabama	5	4	3	7	0.5	0.0
2023	Alabama	14	1	8	9	1	0.5
2024	Alabama	12	5	9	14	0.5	0.0
2025	Michigan	12	8	6	14	1	0.0
Career		43	18	26	44	3	0.5

== Professional career ==
Pre-draft measurables
Height	Weight	Arm length	Hand span	Wingspan	40-yard dash	10-yard split	20-yard split	20-yard shuttle	Three-cone drill	Vertical jump	Broad jump	Bench press
6 ft 3 3/8 in (1.91 m)	308 lb (140 kg)	32 in (0.81 m)	9 1/2 in (0.24 m)	6 ft 4 3/4 in (1.95 m)	5.42 s	1.79 s	3.06 s	4.85 s	7.93 s	26.0 in (0.66 m)	8 ft 4 in (2.54 m)	20 reps
All values from Pro Day

Payne signed with the Kansas City Chiefs as an undrafted free agent on April 26, 2026. Payne was released by Kansas City on August 30.
