= Maason Smith =

American football player (born 2002)

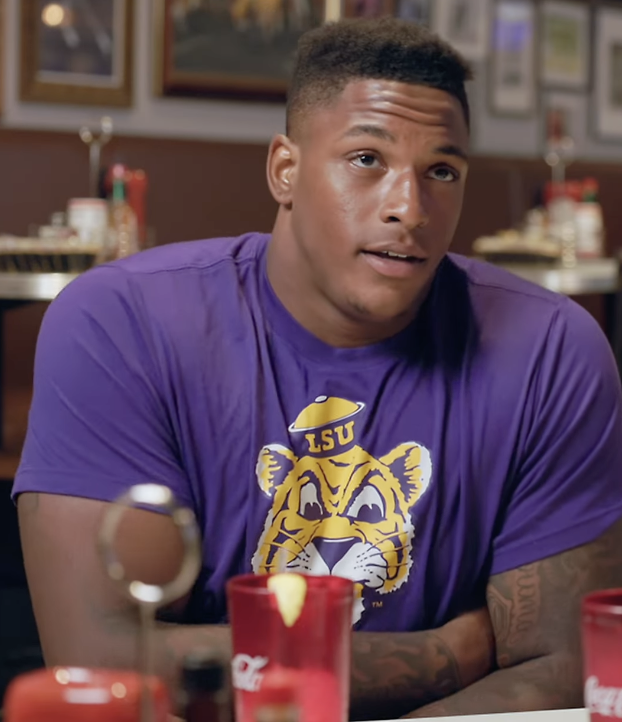
- Smith with the LSU Tigers in 2023

No. 92 – Atlanta Falcons
- Position: Defensive tackle
- Roster status: Active

Personal information
- Born: October 13, 2002 (age 24); Houma, Louisiana, U.S.
- Listed height: 6 ft 5 in (1.96 m)
- Listed weight: 306 lb (139 kg)

Career information
- High school: Terrebonne (Houma)
- College: LSU (2021–2023)
- NFL draft: 2024: 2nd round, 48th overall pick

Career history
- Jacksonville Jaguars (2024–2025); Atlanta Falcons (2026–present)

Awards and highlights
- Freshman All-SEC (2021)

Career NFL statistics as of Week 10, 2026
- Total tackles: 49
- Sacks: 4.0
- Forced fumbles: 1
- Pass deflections: 5
- Stats at Pro Football Reference

Maason Smith (born October 13, 2002) is an American professional football defensive tackle for the Atlanta Falcons of the National Football League (NFL). He played college football for the LSU Tigers, and selected by the Jacksonville Jaguars in the second round of the 2024 NFL draft.

== Early life ==
Smith attended Terrebonne High School in Houma, Louisiana. Smith was one of the top rated recruits in the 2021 class, recording more than 40 tackles and nine sacks in his senior season. As a result, Smith would be named to the All-American Bowl roster. Rated as the highest recruit in Louisiana, Smith decided to stay in state and play college football at Louisiana State University over offers from Miami, Georgia, and Alabama.

== College career ==
At LSU, Smith became the first player to wear the number zero in school history. In his freshman year, Smith would tally 19 tackles, four sacks, and five tackles for loss. Three of Smith's sacks would come against McNeese State. Smith would suffer a leg injury and miss the rest of the season. Smith was named to the All-SEC Freshman Team and the Freshman All-America Team. To open the 2022 season, LSU played Florida State in the Louisiana Kickoff. During the game, while celebrating a play, Smith tore his ACL prematurely ending his season. He returned the following season, totaling 27 tackles and four and a half sacks, before declaring for the 2024 NFL draft.

== Professional career ==
Pre-draft measurables
Height	Weight	Arm length	Hand span	Wingspan	40-yard dash	10-yard split	20-yard split	20-yard shuttle	Three-cone drill	Vertical jump	Broad jump	Bench press
6 ft 5 1/8 in (1.96 m)	306 lb (139 kg)	35 in (0.89 m)	8 1/2 in (0.22 m)	7 ft 0 5/8 in (2.15 m)	5.01 s	1.75 s	2.91 s	4.64 s	7.22 s	31.0 in (0.79 m)	9 ft 0 in (2.74 m)	21 reps
All values from NFL Combine/Pro Day

=== Jacksonville Jaguars ===
Smith was selected by the Jacksonville Jaguars with the 48th overall pick in the second round of the 2024 NFL draft.

=== Atlanta Falcons ===
On April 17, 2026, the Jaguars traded Smith to the Atlanta Falcons in exchange for defensive tackle, Ruke Orhorhoro, who was selected thirteen picks ahead of Smith in the NFL draft.

== NFL career statistics ==
Legend
**Bold**	Career high

=== Regular season ===
Year	Team	Games		Tackles						Fumbles	
Year	Team	GP	GS	Cmb	Solo	Ast	Sck	TFL	PD	FF	FR
2024	JAX	11	5	**17**	**10**	7	**3.0**	**3**	**3**	0	0
2025	JAX	13	2	15	4	**11**	0.0	0	1	0	0
2026	ATL	10	10	17	8	9	1.0	4	1	1	0
Career		34	17	49	22	27	4.0	7	5	1	0
