= Southdown High School =

Former school in Louisiana, United States

Coordinates: 29.5944°N 90.7423°W

Southdown High School was a segregated school for black students in Houma, Louisiana. It was a part of Terrebonne Parish School District

It opened in 1946 as Houma Colored High School, and in 1949 it became Southtown High School. In 1952 grades 6-12 began classes and in 1953 the first class graduated. Its name changed to Southdown High School when it moved into its final location, a St. Charles Street building. Its books originated from the then-white Terrebonne High School and South Terrebonne High School. Eventually it became a grade 9-12 school. In 1969 the school closed following desegregation, and students moved to South Terrebonne High School and Terrebonne High School.
