= Pointe-au-Chien Indian Tribe =

State-recognized tribe and non-profit organization in Louisiana

Pointe au Chien Indian Tribe
- Named after: Pointe-aux-Chênes ("Oak Point"), a community in Terrebonne Parrish
- Formation: 1993
- Type: state-recognized tribe, 501(c)(3) organization
- Tax ID no.: EIN 72-1460716
- Legal status: active
- Purpose: A23: Cultural, Ethnic Awareness
- Headquarters: Montegut, Louisiana
- Location: United States
- Members: about 800 (2022)
- Official language: English
- Leader: Melissa Verdin
- Revenue: $247,037 (2024)
- Website: pactribe.com

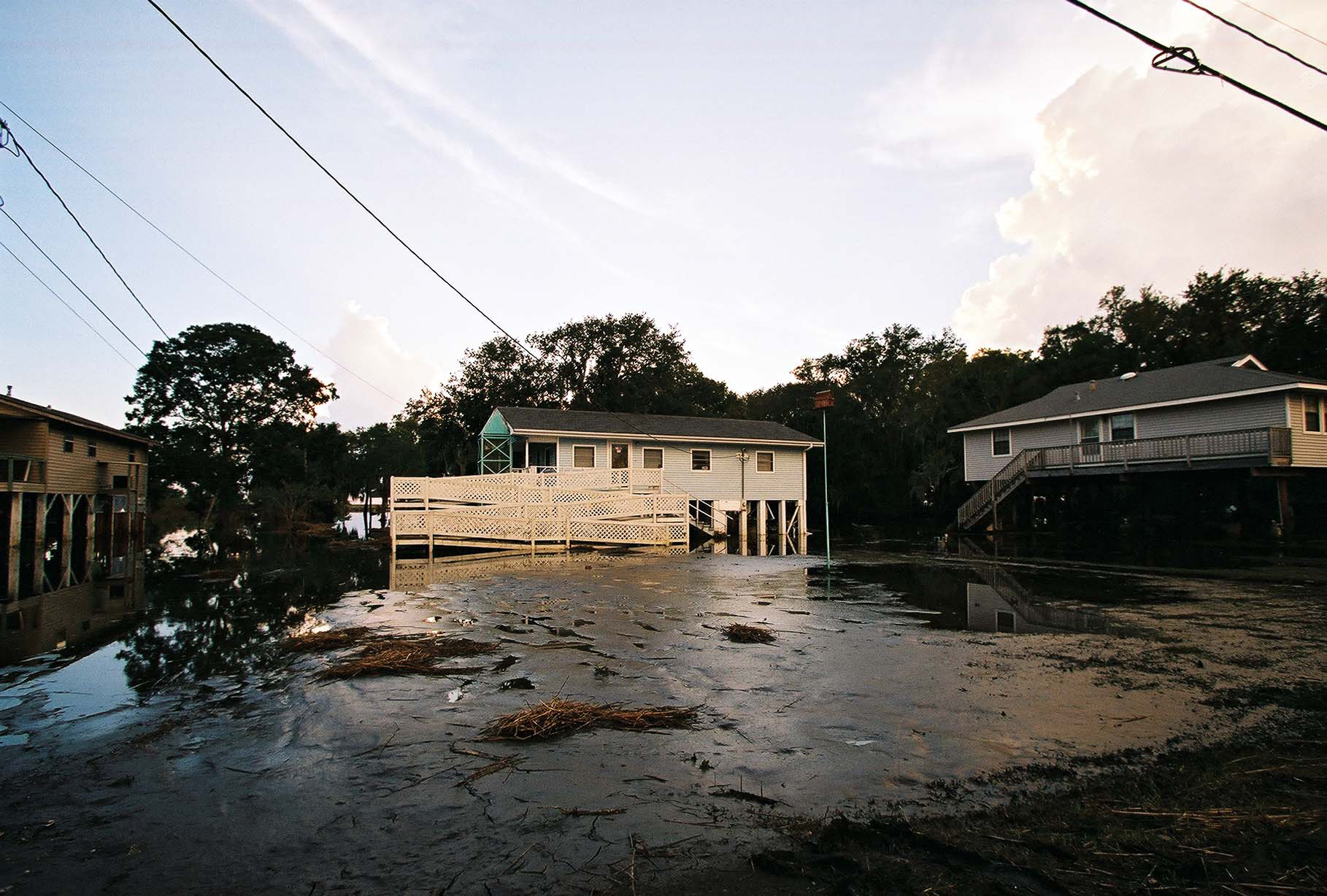
Point-Aux-Chenes, LA, October 7, 2002

Pointe-au-Chien Indian Tribe is a state-recognized tribe and nonprofit organization in Louisiana. It is headquartered in Montegut, Louisiana. It is active in Terrebonne and Lafourche Parishes.

Pointe-au-Chien Indian Tribe (PACIT) identify as descendants of the Acolapissa, Atakapa, Biloxi, Chitimacha, and Choctaw peoples. The organization formerly identified as descending from the Houma people since at least 1907 to 1993.

The group has approximately 800 members.

== History ==
The Pointe-au-Chien Indian Tribe and the Biloxi-Chitimacha Confederation of Muskogees broke away from the United Houma Nation in the 1990s. All three are state-recognized tribes today in Louisiana.

== Nonprofit organization ==
The Pointe Au Chien Indian Tribe organized as a 501(c)(3) nonprofit organization based in Montegut, Louisiana. Its tax-exempt status was temporarily revoked in 2023 but has been restored by 2024.

Its principal officer is Melissa Verdin. Its total assets were $517,288 in 2024.

== Petition for federal recognition ==
In 1996, the group petitioned to the United States Bureau of Indian Affairs for federal recognition after breaking away from the United Houma Nation, whose petition had been denied. In 2008, the proposed amending finding stated that the Pointe-au-Chien Indian Tribe "is not an Indian tribe within the meaning of the Federal law," since their ancestors did not constitute a community or hold political influence over the group before 1830. The preliminary finding states, "The evidence in the record has not demonstrated that the PACIT petitioner's members descend from a historical Indian tribe..." Their petition is still being processed under the revised 2015 criteria for recognition.

== Hurricane Ida ==
Although the Pointe Au Chien Indian Tribe has survived hurricanes for hundreds of years, Hurricane Ida devastated the Pointe-au-Chien community on August 29, 2021, leaving unprecedented damage with about 150 tribal families in need of assistance for temporary housing and rebuilding. Because of not being a federally recognized tribe, important disaster proclamations and rescue funds were not forthcoming from U.S. government relief agencies.

== Education ==
The tribe established a French immersion charter school, École Pointe-au-Chien, in Pointe-aux-Chenes, after the Terrebonne Parish School District closed that community's public school in 2021. The school district sold the former Pointe-aux-Chênes school building to the tribe, for one dollar, so the French immersion school could be housed there.

In the summers, they host Pointe-au-Chien Indian Tribe Culture Camp.

== Further media ==
- Johnson, Ben (2023). The Precipice. Louisiana Public Broadcasting.
