= Jesse Myles =

American football player (1960–2010)

No. 14
- Position: Running back

Personal information
- Born: September 28, 1960; New Orleans, Louisiana
- Died: March 7, 2010 (aged 49); Gray, Louisiana
- Listed height: 5 ft 10 in (1.78 m)
- Listed weight: 210 lb (95 kg)

Career information
- High school: Gray (LA) H. L. Bourgeois
- College: LSU
- NFL draft: 1983: undrafted

Career history
- Denver Broncos (1983–1984)
- Stats at Pro Football Reference

Jesse Myles (September 28, 1960 – March 7, 2010) was an American football running back. He played for the Denver Broncos from 1983 to 1984.

He died on March 7, 2010, in Gray, Louisiana at age 49.
