= Troy Johnson (wide receiver) =

American football player (born 1962)

No. 87, 85, 83
- Position: Wide receiver

Personal information
- Born: October 20, 1962 (age 64); New Orleans, Louisiana, U.S.
- Listed height: 6 ft 1 in (1.85 m)
- Listed weight: 180 lb (82 kg)

Career information
- High school: South Terrebonne (Bourg, Louisiana)
- College: Southeastern Louisiana; Southern
- NFL draft: 1984: undrafted

Career history
- Denver Gold (1985); Dallas Cowboys (1986)*; St. Louis Cardinals (1986–1987); Pittsburgh Steelers (1988); Detroit Lions (1989); Winnipeg Blue Bombers (1991); Connecticut Coyotes (1995)
- * Offseason or practice squad member only

Career NFL statistics
- Games played: 50
- Receptions: 41
- Receiving yards: 777
- Touchdowns: 2
- Stats at Pro Football Reference
- Stats at ArenaFan.com

Troy Dwan Johnson (born October 20, 1962) is an American former professional football player who was a wide receiver in the National Football League (NFL) for the St. Louis Cardinals, Pittsburgh Steelers and Detroit Lions. He played college football for the Southeastern Louisiana Lions and Southern Jaguars. He also played in the USFL for the Denver Gold, Canadian Football League for the Winnipeg Blue Bombers and the Arena Football League for the Connecticut Coyotes.
