= Terrebonne Parish School District =

School district in Louisiana, United States

Address
- 201 Stadium Drive Houma, Louisiana, 70360; United States
- Coordinates: 29.6003°N 90.7390°W

District information
- Type: Public
- Grades: PreK–12
- NCES District ID: 2201740

Students and staff
- Students: 16,563 (2020–2021)
- Teachers: 880.05 (on an FTE basis)
- Staff: 761.67 (on an FTE basis)
- Student–teacher ratio: 18.82:1

Other information
- Website: www.tpsd.org

Terrebonne Parish School District is a school district headquartered in Bayou Cane, an unincorporated area in Terrebonne Parish, Louisiana, near Houma. The district serves residents in Terrebonne Parish, including the city of Houma as well as the surrounding unincorporated areas of Bayou Cane, Bourg, Chauvin, Gibson, Gray, Montegut, and Schriever.

Residents of select portions of Lafourche Parish (particularly in parts of Grand Bois and Bourg) may attend schools in the Terrebonne Parish School District. Students with certain medical problems and children of certain teachers residing in Terrebonne Parish may attend school in the Lafourche Parish Public Schools only if superintendents of both systems approve it on a case-by-case basis.

== History ==
The school district made academic improvement between 2015 and 2016; it received a higher score in the Louisiana Department of Education rankings, 95.1 from 90.5; both levels are classified as "B".

== School uniforms ==
The school district requires its PK-12 students to wear school uniforms.

== Schools ==
=== Elementary schools ===
- Acadian Elementary School (PK-4, Houma)
- Bourg Elementary School (PK-4, Bourg)
- Broadmoor Elementary School (PK-6, Houma)
- Coteau-Bayou Blue Elementary School (PK-6, Houma)
- Dularge Elementary School (PK-6, Houma)
- Grand Caillou Elementary School (PK-4, Houma)
- Legion Park Elementary School (PK-6, Houma)
- Lisa Park Elementary School (PK-6, Houma)
- Montegut Elementary School (PK-4, Montegut)
- Mulberry Elementary School (PK-6, Houma)
- Oakshire Elementary School (PK-6, Houma)
- Schriever Elementary School (PK-3, Schriever)
- Southdown Elementary School (PK-6, Houma)
- Upper Little Caillou Elementary School (PK-4, Chauvin)
- Village East Elementary School (PK-6, Houma)

=== Middle schools ===
- Caldwell Middle School (4-6, Schriever)
- Grand Caillou Middle School (5-8, Houma)
- Lacache Middle School (5-8, Chauvin)
- Montegut Middle School (5-8, Montegut)
- Oaklawn Middle School (5-8, Houma)

=== Junior high schools ===
- Evergreen Junior High School (7-8, Houma)
- Houma Junior High School (7-8, Houma)

=== High schools ===
- Ellender Memorial High School (9-12, Houma)
- H. L. Bourgeois High School (9-12, Gray)
- South Terrebonne High School (9-12, Bourg)
- Terrebonne High School (9-12, Houma)
- Louis Miller Terrebonne Career and Technical High School (9-12, Houma)

=== Alternative schools ===
- Bayou Cane Adult Education (Houma)
- East Street Alternative School (Houma)
- School for Exceptional Children (Houma)

== Former schools ==
- Pointe-Aux-Chenes Elementary School (PK-4, Pointe-aux-Chenes, near Montegut)
  - In 2021, the enrollment was around 100. Most of the students were Cajun and Native American, and these students came from French-speaking households. The board of trustees agreed to close the school in 2021. Six board members voted to close the school while three voted against it. Area parents held protests as the board held its closure vote, then sued the district in federal court to attempt to stop the closure. Students were re-assigned to Montegut Elementary School. The Pointe-aux-Chenes school closed, and Hurricane Ida caused damage to the facility. The lawsuit prompted members of the Louisiana Legislature to consider authorizing a French immersion school. École Pointe-au-Chien. The Louisiana House of Representatives approved that proposal, as did John Bel Edwards, then Governor of Louisiana. The new charter school opened in 2023. It had plans to relocate to the former Pointe-Aux-Chenes building. The plans were realized after the district sold the school building for one dollar to the Pointe-au-Chien Tribe.

Schools for black people:

- Southdown High School (originally Houma Colored High School)
