= Terrebonne High School =

Location
- 7318 Main Street; Houma, Louisiana 70360; United States; 29°35′58″N 90°44′13″W

Information
- Type: Public
- Motto: Where Learning Lasts a Lifetime
- Established: 1908
- Principal: Trisha Melancon
- Teaching staff: 65.50 (FTE)
- Grades: 9 - 12
- Enrollment: 1,346 (2024-2025)
- Student to teacher ratio: 19.65
- Colors: Crimson and gold
- Mascot: Ida the Tiger
- Nickname: Tigers
- Website: Terrebonne High School

Terrebonne High School is a high school in Houma, Louisiana. It is a part of the Terrebonne Parish School District.

== History ==
In 1969, Southdown High School (originally Houma Colored High School), which educated black students in Terrebonne Parish, was closed. Students were moved to Terrebonne High and South Terrebonne High School.

From 2015 to 2016, the Louisiana State Department of Education score for this school declined from 100.1 to 99.3; as an "A" level school makes 100 points or more, Terrebonne's rank fell from A to B.

In the fall of 2017, the 9th grade was scheduled to be moved from Houma Junior High School to Terrebonne High. In all other areas of Terrebonne Parish, 9th graders were already at the high school level. From February 2017 until the fall of 2017, existing 9th-grade students were reclassified as Terrebonne High students but continued to take classes in portable buildings at Houma Junior High.

== Athletics ==
Terrebonne High athletics competes in the LHSAA.

== Notable alumni ==
- Sherman A. Bernard, Louisiana insurance commissioner from 1972 to 1988
- Richie Cunningham, NFL placekicker.
- Gordon Dove, Houma businessman and state representative
- Hunt Downer, former Speaker of the Louisiana House of Representatives; first secretary of the Louisiana Veterans Affairs Department
- Earl Gros, NFL running back
- Jay Pennison, former NFL and USFL player
- Maason Smith, current defensive tackle for the Atlanta Falcons, former Jacksonville Jaguar and LSU Tiger
- Wally Whitehurst, former MLB player (New York Mets, San Diego Padres, New York Yankees)
- Justin Williams (baseball), Professional Baseball Player, (Tampa Bay Rays, St. Louis Cardinals)
