= École Pointe-au-Chien =

Louisiana elementary school

Coordinates: 29.484°N 90.511°W

Location
- 1558 LA 665; Montegut postal address, Louisiana 70377

Information
- Established: 2023
- Principal: Christine Verdin
- Grades: PK–4
- Enrollment: 9 (2024)
- Language: French of France; Louisiana French
- Website: https://www.ecolepointeauchien.org/

École Pointe-au-Chien (EPAC) is a public French immersion elementary school in Pointe-aux-Chênes, an unincorporated area in Terrebonne Parish, Louisiana. It has a Montegut postal address, but is not in the Montegut census-designated place. The Louisiana Legislature created the school, which is governed by a board of trustees appointed by various entities.

The school teaches the French of France and Cajun French, but also "Indian French", meaning the varieties of French spoken by indigenous communities in southern coastal Louisiana. It is the first school to teach Indian French.

The chief executive officer of Télé-Louisiane, Will McGrew, described it as the first such school in several categories: the first French immersion school in its parish, the first local French dialect immersion school, and the first French immersion school with a majority of students who are members of a state-recognized tribe. As of 2023, McGrew is the president of the appointed board of directors that operates the school.

== History ==
The school was established after the Terrebonne Parish School Board closed Pointe-aux-Chenes Elementary School. Most students were Cajun and members of the Pointe-au-Chien Indian Tribe and came from French-speaking households.

A lawsuit contesting the school closure prompted members of the Louisiana Legislature to consider authorizing a French immersion school. The bill to do so, HB 261 (Act 454), was filed by Tanner Magee, a Republican legislator from Houma. This bill set aside $3,000,000 to establish and fund the institution. The Louisiana House of Representatives approved that proposal, with all members voting in favor. John Bel Edwards, then Governor of Louisiana, also approved the proposal.

The new school opened in 2023. Its initial location was in Bourg, in the Vision Christian Center. Christine Verdin became the first principal; she is an enrolled member of the Pointe-au-Chien Tribe whose first language is French.

Activists also created a proposal for a charter school, but the school district rejected the charter application. The rejection occurred on the day the Louisiana House voted to approve the proposal.

The school had plans to relocate to the former Pointe-Aux-Chenes building, which needed renovations as the building had been affected by Hurricane Ida. In the meantime, it used a facility owned by the Knights of Columbus. The plans to move to the former public school grounds were realized after the district sold the school building for one dollar to the Pointe-au-Chien Tribe. In November 2023, Edwards attended the opening of the permanent facility of school.

In 2024, the enrollment was nine students, with the majority belonging to the Pointe-au-Chien Tribe.

== Governance ==
The school is operated by a board with 13 members, with the Consulate-General of France in New Orleans, local state-recognized tribes, and state agencies of Louisiana appointing the board members.

The only governing authority of the school is the appointed board. The Louisiana State Superintendent of Education has no direct say over the school, nor does any school district or any other educational authority.

== Admissions ==
The school gives preference in admissions to students who have been forced to move from their original residences due to Hurricane Ida, and to residents of Pointe-aux-Chenes and Isle de Jean Charles.

== Curriculum ==
As of 2023, the school administration intends to have formal coursework in local French dialects, but uses informal methods of teaching local French dialects while using formal materials in the French of France. This was due to a lack of formal teaching materials and lesson plans for these French dialects.

== Further media ==
- "2022 Regular Session HOUSE BILL NO. 261". Louisiana Legislature.
- "Ecole Pointe-Au-Chien Board of Directors". Louisiana Legislature.
- "Ecole Pointe-Au-Chien: A Historic Victory | La Veillée". Louisiana Public Broadcasting. October 6, 2023.
- "Louisiana's first Indigenous French immersion school fights to preserve culture of Pointe-au-Chien T (sic)". WWL-TV. December 28, 2023. - On an official YouTube channel
