= Ellender Memorial High School =

Allen J. Ellender Memorial High School

Location
- 3012 Patriot Drive; Houma, Louisiana; United States; 29.56595°N 90.67762°W

Information
- Type: High school
- Motto: Excellence, Enthusiasm, Endeavor
- Established: 1976 (junior high); 1988 (high school)
- School district: Terrebonne Parish School District
- Principal: Darrell Dillard
- Teaching staff: 47.00 (FTE)
- Enrollment: 883 (2023-2024)
- Student to teacher ratio: 18.79
- Colors: Red, white, and blue
- Mascot: Patriots
- Newspaper: The Stars And Stripes
- Website: www.tpsd.org/schools/emh

Ellender Memorial High School, is a public high school located in Houma, Louisiana, United States. It is within the Terrebonne Parish School District and is the fourth public high school to open in that district.

Ellender Memorial High School was named after United States Senator Allen Joseph Ellender.

In 2008, two co-valedictorians used a Vietnamese phrase to thank their families during their graduation speech. After the speech, the school board proposed rules to require that graduation speeches use only English. This proposal was met with heavy backlash and was rejected.

== School uniforms ==
The school requires its students to wear school uniforms. The school's designated alternate shirt colors are "Royal Blue" and Navy Blue.

== Athletics ==
Ellender Memorial High athletics competes in the LHSAA.

== Notable alumni ==
- Tay Martin - NFL Wide receiver
