= The Biggest Loser season 6 =

The Biggest Loser
- Season 6
- No. of episodes: 13

Release
- Original network: NBC
- Original release: September 16 – December 16, 2008

Season chronology
- ← Previous; Season 5 (Couples) Next → Season 7 (Couples 2)

The Biggest Loser: Families is the sixth season of the NBC reality television series The Biggest Loser. The sixth season premiered on September 16, 2008, featuring Alison Sweeney as the host and Bob Harper and Jillian Michaels as the contestants' trainers.

The cast was revealed on August 29, 2008. Eight duos began the challenge, for a total of 16 contestants.

From Week 1 to Week 5, the Green, Red, Orange, and Brown Teams (husband and wives) trained with Bob, while the Purple, Gray, Yellow, and Pink Teams (parents and children) trained with Jillian. In Week 5, these "Family Teams" were disbanded and the contestants were split into the Blue Team and the Black Team. In week 8, the teams were split again and the competition went into individuals. Amy Cremen was originally under Jillian's training, but in week 5, was placed in and eliminated under Bob's training. Phillip Parham started the competition under Bob's training but was eliminated under Jillian's training.

Michelle Aguilar was named the Biggest Loser on December 16, 2008, after losing 110 pounds. She won $250,000. Heba was named the Biggest Loser of the eliminated contestants, and won $100,000.

== Contestants ==
Contestant	Families Team	Blue vs. Black	Status	Total votes
† Adam Capers, 39, Gainesville, VA	Green Team		Eliminated Week 1	4
Stacey Capers, 33, Gainesville, VA	Green Team		Eliminated Week 1	4
LT Desrochers, 23, Everett, MA	Gray Team		Eliminated Week 2	3
Tom Desrochers, 42, Everett, MA	Gray Team		Eliminated Week 2	3
Jerry Skeabeck, 51, Cleveland, OH	Yellow Team		Eliminated Week 3	1
Ed Brantley, Returned Week 8	Orange Team		Eliminated Week 4	1
Shellay Cremen, 51, Royal Oak, MI	Purple Team	Black Team	Eliminated Week 5	3
Amy Parham, 40, Greer, SC	Red Team	Blue Team	Eliminated Week 6	3
Phillip Parham, 41, Greer, SC	Red Team	Black Team	Eliminated Week 7	3
Brady Vilcan, 36, Houma, LA	Brown Team	Blue Team	Eliminated Week 8	3
Coleen Skeabeck, 24, Cleveland, OH	Yellow Team	Black Team	Eliminated Week 9	3
Amy Cremen, 26, Auburn Hills, MI	Purple Team	Blue Team	Eliminated Week 10	2
Renee Wilson, 46, Fort Worth, TX	Pink Team	Black Team	Eliminated Week 11	2
Heba Salama, 30, Raleigh, NC	Orange Team	Blue Team	Eliminated at Finale	America's Vote Victim
Vicky Vilcan, 37, Houma, LA	Brown Team	Blue Team	2nd Runner-Up	2
Ed Brantley, 31, Raleigh, NC	Orange Team	Blue Team	Runner Up	2
Michelle Aguilar, 26, Fort Worth, TX	Pink Team	Black Team	Biggest Loser	4

Total Votes counts only the votes given to the eliminated contestant that were revealed at the elimination. The total does not count unrevealed votes (if the contestant has already received the required number of votes needed to be eliminated).

== Weigh-ins ==
Contestant	Age	Height	Starting BMI	Ending BMI	Starting weight	Week														Weight lost	Percentage lost
Contestant	Age	Height	Starting BMI	Ending BMI	Starting weight	1	2	3	4	5	6	7	8		9	10	11	12	Finale	Weight lost	Percentage lost
Michelle	26	5'3"	42.9	23.4	242	225	223	220	216	209	202	200	X	194	186	176	171	162	132	**110**	**45.45%**
Ed	31	6'3"	41.9	24.5	335	318	309	299	299				277	273	262	253	250	252	196	139	41.49%
Vicky	37	5'6"	39.4	23.6	246	227	223	220	217	211	203	201	X	193	187	180	176	170	145	101	41.06%
Heba	30	5'10"	42.2	22.4	294	282	280	274	266	258	253	247	X	238	231	224	217	210	156	138	46.94%
Renee	46	5'7"	41.8	25.2	267	253	248	242	237	232	225	222	X	215	207	199	195		161	106	39.70%
Amy C.	26	5'5"	39.8	22.5	239	222	219	213	208	199	193	187	X	181	173	168			135	104	43.51%
Coleen	24	5'2"	39.9	28.2	218	208	202	195	192	187	179	177	X	170	167				154	64	29.36%
Brady	36	6'0"	46.2	30.4	341	313	306	301	292	286	283	270	X	264					224	117	34.31%
Phil	41	5'9"	48.9	26.6	331	308	300	290	287	279	272	269	263						180	151	45.62%
Amy P.	40	5'4"	39.3	21.3	229	213	209	204	199	193	191		182						124	105	45.85%
Shellay	51	5'7"	33.8	22.2	216	204	201	198	194	189			177						142	74	34.26%
Jerry	51	5'10"	54.5	38.0	380	363	358	360					339						265	115	30.26%
LT	23	5'8"	54.3	41.0	357	339	342						300						270	87	24.37%
Tom	42	5'10"	45.0	33.9	314	290	287						266						236	78	24.84%
Adam	39	6'4"	41.4	31.6	340	321							305						260	80	23.53%
Stacey	33	5'7"	34.6	24.4	221	212							191						156	65	29.41%

Teams

In week 5, the teams were shuffled up. Heba won the temptation that gave her the power to choose the new blue and black teams, and as a result, Heba, Vicky, Brady, Amy C. and Amy P. formed the new Blue Team, while Shellay, Phillip, Michelle, Renee, and Coleen formed the new black team. When Ed re-entered the game in week 8, he went to Bob's Blue Team.

Game
Results from "Eliminated Players" Weigh-in.
Week's Biggest Loser
Immunity (Challenge or Weigh-In)
Last person eliminated before finale (by America voting).
Winners
$250,000 Winner (among the finalists)
$100,000 Winner (among the eliminated contestants)
BMI
Normal (18.5 – 24.9 BMI)
Overweight (25 – 29.9 BMI)
Obese Class I (30 – 34.9 BMI)
Obese Class II (35 – 39.9 BMI)
Obese Class III (greater than 40 BMI)
Notes

In week 7, the Black Team lost the team challenge, and as a penalty, Michelle's weight loss was not counted towards their total team's weight loss.

=== Weigh-in figures history ===
Contestant	Week												
Contestant	1	2	3	4	5	6	7	8	9	10	11	12	Finale
Michelle	−17	−2	−3	−4	−7	−7	−2	−6	−8	−10	−5	−9	−30
Ed	−17	−9	−10	0	-22			−4	−11	−9	−3	+2	−56
Vicky	−19	−4	−3	−3	−6	−8	−2	−8	−6	−7	−4	−6	−25
Heba	−12	−2	−6	−8	−8	−5	−6	−9	−7	−7	−7	−7	-54
Renee	−14	−5	−6	−5	−5	−7	−3	−7	−8	−8	−4	-34	
Amy C.	−17	−3	−6	−5	−9	−6	−6	−6	−8	−5	-33		
Coleen	−10	−6	−7	−3	−5	−8	−2	−7	−3	-13			
Brady	−28	−7	−5	−9	−6	−3	−13	−6	-40				
Phillip	−23	−8	−10	−3	−8	−7	−3	-6	-83				
Amy P.	−16	−4	−5	−5	−6	−2	-9		-58				
Shellay	−12	−3	−3	−4	−5	-12			-35				
Jerry	−17	−5	+2	-21					-74				
L.T.	−18	+3	-42						-30				
Tom	−24	−3	-21						-30				
Adam	−19	-16							-45				
Stacey	−9	-21							-35				

On-ranch weigh-in figures (except between week 12 and finale)
At-home weigh-in figures

=== Weigh-in percentages history ===
Contestant	Week												Finale
Contestant	1	2	3	4	5	6	7	8	9	10	11	12	Finale
Michelle	−7.02%	−0.89%	−1.35%	−1.82%	−3.24%	−3.35%	−0.99%	−3.00%	−4.12%	−5.38%	−2.84%	−5.26%	−18.52%
Ed	−5.07%	−2.83%	−3.24%	0.00%	-7.36%			−1.44%	−4.03%	−3.44%	−1.19%	+0.80%	−22.22%
Vicky	−7.72%	−1.76%	−1.35%	−1.36%	−2.77%	−3.79%	−0.99%	−3.98%	−3.11%	−3.74%	−2.22%	−3.41%	−14.71%
Heba	−4.08%	−0.71%	−2.14%	−2.92%	−3.01%	−1.94%	−2.37%	−3.64%	−2.94%	−3.03%	−3.13%	−3.23%	-25.71%
Renee	−5.24%	−1.98%	−2.42%	−2.07%	−2.11%	−3.02%	−1.33%	−3.15%	−3.72%	−3.86%	−2.01%	-17.44%	
Amy C.	−7.11%	−1.35%	−2.74%	−2.35%	−4.33%	−3.02%	−3.11%	−3.21%	−4.42%	−2.89%	-19.64%		
Coleen	−4.59%	−2.88%	−3.47%	−1.54%	−2.60%	−4.28%	−1.12%	−3.95%	−1.76%	-7.78%			
Brady	−8.21%	−2.24%	−1.63%	−2.99%	−2.05%	−1.05%	−4.59%	−2.22%	-15.15%				
Phillip	−6.95%	−2.60%	−3.33%	−1.03%	−2.78%	−2.51%	−1.10%	-2.23%	-31.56%				
Amy P.	−6.99%	−1.88%	−2.39%	−2.45%	−3.02%	−1.04%	-4.71%		-31.87%				
Shellay	−5.56%	−1.47%	−1.49%	−2.02%	−2.58%	-6.35%			-19.77%				
Jerry	−4.47%	−1.38%	+0.56%	-5.83%					-21.83%				
L.T.	−5.04%	+0.88%	-12.28%						-10.00%				
Tom	−7.64%	−1.03%	-7.32%						-11.28%				
Adam	−5.59%	-4.98%							-14.75%				
Stacey	−4.07%	-9.91%							-18.32%				

On-ranch weigh-in percentages (except between week 12 and finale)
At-home weigh-in percentages

=== Total Overall Percentage of Weight Loss (Biggest Loser on Campus) ===
Bold denotes who has the overall highest percentage of weight loss as of that week

Contestant	Week											
Contestant	1	2	3	4	5	6	7	8	9	10	11	12
Michelle	−7.02%	−7.85%	−9.09%	−10.74%	−13.64%	−16.53%	−17.36%	−19.83%	−23.14%	−27.27%	**-29.34%**	**-33.06%**
Ed	−5.07%	−7.76%	−10.75%	−10.75%	-17.31%			−18.51%	−21.79%	−24.48%	−25.37%	−24.78%
Vicky	−7.72%	−9.35%	−10.57%	−11.79%	−14.23%	−17.48%	−18.29%	−21.54%	−23.98%	−26.83%	−28.46%	−30.89%
Heba	−4.08%	−4.76%	−6.80%	−9.52%	−12.24%	−13.95%	−15.99%	−19.05%	−21.43%	−23.81%	−26.19%	−28.57%
Renee	−5.24%	−7.12%	−9.36%	−11.24%	−13.11%	−15.73%	−16.85%	−19.48%	−22.47%	−25.47%	−26.97%	
Amy C.	−7.11%	−8.37%	−10.88%	−12.97%	**-16.74%**	**-19.25%**	**-21.76%**	**-24.27%**	**-27.62%**	**-29.71%**		
Coleen	−4.59%	−7.34%	−10.55%	−11.93%	−14.22%	−17.89%	−18.81%	−22.02%	−23.39%			
Brady	**-8.21%**	**-10.26%**	−11.73%	**-14.37%**	−16.13%	−17.01%	−20.82%	−22.58%				
Phillip	−6.95%	−9.37%	**-12.39%**	−13.29%	−15.71%	−17.82%	−18.73%					
Amy P.	−6.99%	−8.73%	−10.92%	−13.10%	−15.72%	−16.59%						
Shellay	−5.56%	−6.94%	−8.33%	−10.19%	−12.50%							
Jerry	−4.47%	−5.79%	−5.26%									
L.T.	−5.04%	−4.20%										
Tom	−7.64%	−8.60%										
Adam	−5.59%											
Stacey	−4.07%											

== Elimination voting history ==
Name	Week 1	Week 2	Week 3	Week 4	Week 5	Week 6	Week 7	Week 8	Week 9	Week 10	Week 11	Week 12
Eliminated	Adam & Stacey	Tom & LT	Jerry	Ed	Shellay	Amy P.	Phillip	Brady	Coleen	Amy C.	Renee	Heba
Michelle	?	?	X	X	Shellay	X	Phillip	X	Vicky	Heba	Ed	Biggest Loser
Ed	X	Tom & LT	X	X	Eliminated Week 4, Returned Week 8			Michelle	Coleen	Amy C.	X	X
Vicky	Adam & Stacey	?	X	X	X	Amy P.	X	Michelle	X	Amy C.	Renee	X
Heba	X	Tom & LT	X	Ed	X	Amy P.	X	Michelle	Coleen	X	Renee	Eliminated at Finale
Renee	?	?	X	X	Shellay	X	Phillip	Brady	Vicky	Heba	X	Eliminated Week 11
Amy C.	?	Tom & LT	X	X	X	Brady	X	Brady	Coleen	X	Eliminated Week 10	
Coleen	?	X	Jerry	X	Shellay	X	Phillip	Brady	X	Eliminated Week 9		
Brady	Adam & Stacey	?	X	X	X	Amy P.	X	X	Eliminated Week 8			
Phillip	Adam & Stacey	Tom & LT	X	X	Renee	X	Michelle	Eliminated Week 7				
Amy P.	Adam & Stacey	Tom & LT	X	X	X	Brady	Eliminated Week 6					
Shellay	?	Tom & LT	X	X	Renee	Eliminated Week 5						
Jerry	?	X	X	Eliminated Week 3								
LT	Adam & Stacey	X	Eliminated Week 2									
Tom	Adam & Stacey	X	Eliminated Week 2									
Adam	X	Eliminated Week 1										
Stacey	X	Eliminated Week 1										

Immunity
? Immunity, vote not revealed
X Below yellow line, unable to vote
X Not in elimination, unable to vote
? Hidden vote
Eliminated or not in house
Valid vote cast
X Below yellow line, America Votes
Last person eliminated before the finale (by America voting)
$250,000 winner (among the finalists)

== Episode summaries ==
=== Week 1 ===
First aired September 16, 2008

The Biggest Loser: Families includes eight duos – four married couples and four parent-child pairings. It was announced that the married teams would train with Bob on his side of the gym, while the parent–child teams would train with Jillian on her side of the gym. As with prior seasons, the contestants were selected in surprise announcements—among notable ones, the Pink team was announced during a service at Fellowship Church (the large DFW-area megachurch).

The teams visited with Dr. Robert Huizenga, or Dr H., who showed the contestants how unhealthy they had become up to this point in their lives. The doctor displayed images of the contestants' unhealthy bodies, and explained their biological age (age based on health) as compared with their physical age (age based on how long the person has actually lived). All of the contestants' biological ages were significantly older than their physical ages; all gained at least 10 years, and two contestants were actually 25 years or more older internally than they were externally.

The teams participated in the first challenge, which was a mile hike over a hill. There were seven prizes available for claiming: $5,000, a luxury spa and massage, a 24-hour visit home, a phone call home, an extra vote at the elimination, 24 hours alone with their trainer, or immunity at the weigh-in. The last pair up the mountain would have to claim a two-pound penalty for their total weight loss. Due to health concerns, both Jerry (Yellow) and Tom (Gray) had to sit out the challenge. Colleen of the Yellow team made it up the hill first and claimed immunity. The Gray team won the extra vote, the Red team won the 24-hour visit home, the Green team won the luxury, the Orange team won the $5,000, the Pink team won the phone call home, and the Purple team was rewarded with 24 hours with their trainer. The Brown team came in last and were given the two-pound penalty.

At the weigh-in the Brown team had the highest percentage of weight loss for the week despite their two-pound penalty. The Orange team and the Green team fell below the yellow line with the lowest percentages of weight loss. At the elimination ceremony only the votes of the Brown, Red and Gray teams were revealed. The Gray Team won the extra vote at the challenge, and cast two votes. All three teams voted for the green team. Having received four out of the seven votes, the Green team was the first team to be eliminated.

=== Week 2 ===
First aired September 23, 2008

Alison addressed the teams, warning them that during previous seasons, on average, teams only experienced an average of 2% weight loss during week 2. She offered the teams an opportunity to participate in an auction, bidding on their percentage of weight loss for their duo. Teams started bidding at 1%, and incremented by 0.1%. The winning duo was the Yellow team, bidding to lose 2.4% of the weight that week, the equivalent of 14 pounds total. The prize for achieving this goal was $10,000; if penalty for not achieving this goal was to automatically be placed below the yellow line.

At the challenge, teams were to go down a Slip 'n Slide, then walk back up a hill. For each timed round, team members took turns on the hill. If a contestant did not make it up the hill within the time limit, their team was eliminated from competition. The last team remaining was declared the winner, and won a call home. Ed and Heba of the Orange team won, and then Ali told them that they would be able to choose another team that would also be allowed to call home. They gave that chance to the Red team, Amy P. and Phillip.

Teams were then visited by celebrity chef Rocco DiSpirito, who worked with one member of each team to make a healthy, affordable meal. The non-cooking contestants selected the Amy C. of the Purple Team as having cooked the best meal. As a prize, the Purple Team was awarded a year's worth of groceries.

At the weigh in, Amy P. and Phillip won while Tom and LT fell below the yellow line, with LT having gained three pounds. The Yellow team weighed in last, losing only 11 combined pounds, falling three pounds short of their goal, and were placed below the yellow line as a penalty. Of the five teams that could vote, the first three all voted for LT and Tom, the Gray team, resulting in their elimination.

Though the outcome would not have changed salt was added to the wounds when Heba and Ed went against their word and voted the grey team out after being saved by grey the previous week.

=== Week 3 ===
First aired September 30, 2008

For this week, the contestants spent most of the week on a trip in the Grand Canyon. During the trip, it is shown that the contestants may have not exercised as much as they should have, and had a difficult time adapting to the new environment.

This week's challenge was a canoe challenge. Players would have 90 seconds to paddle their canoe out into the water, then after that, players from the other teams would have to pull in opponent's canoes to stop them from paddling out more. The Orange Team won the challenge and were rewarded with a stay in a luxury RV while the rest of the teams remained in tents. While at the canyon, the contestants celebrated Colleen's 24th birthday.

Upon returning to the ranch, the contestants and trainers have conflict over the lack of exercise. The contestants complained of either not knowing how to use the equipment given to them or being in an environment not conducive to exercise.

At the weigh-in, Ali announces that starting this week, only one family will fall below the yellow line instead of two. The family below the yellow line will have to pick one of the family members to be eliminated, and that team will have the only vote at the elimination. The Red Team was the biggest loser team of the week, with a percentage of 2.95%, while Colleen & Jerry fell below the yellow line for the second week in the row; with Jerry gaining 2 pounds. After an hour of deliberating, the Yellow Team decided to send Jerry home to allow his hamstring injury to heal.

=== Week 4 ===
First aired October 7, 2008, and October 8, 2008, due to the presidential debate

The episode begins with Colleen in the confessional talking about what it's like being the only one without her partner. Later, Amy P. and Phillip (Red Team) cash in their prize for their 24-hour visit home, which they won in the first week, and back at the ranch, the purple team used their 24 hours with their trainer, also a prize from the first week. Jillian took the girls to a fitness center for personal training. She found it difficult to work with Shellay, as she was always reluctant to work out as hard as Amy C.

For the Week 4 challenge, contestants were made to stand on a bar in a pool full of water, while holding another bar overhead. During the challenge the pool was drained, thus affecting the buoyancy of the contestants (making it harder for them to hold the bar). After 90 minutes, with the rules changed to where the contestants could hold the bar with only one hand, several contestants began to fall into the water and were eliminated. Over the next 10 minutes, the remaining teams are eliminated until only Vicky, from the Brown Team, and Amy C. from the Purple Team, were remaining. After nearly 2 hours of the challenge, Amy C. finally dropped and Vicky was victorious. As a prize, the Brown team received a package from home. They also got to pick another team to receive the same prize. Vicky and Brady selected the Purple team, who were runners-up in the challenge.

Later on, while working out, Jillian found out that her players were not keeping up to her standards, thus sending her into a rage. She even went as far as kicking Amy C. out of the gym. But she came back later, and Jillian complimented her for her choice.

At the weigh-in, the elimination risk was once again based on last week's twist: only one team would fall below the yellow line and had to decide between them who would continue on the ranch and who would go home (if Colleen were to fall below the yellow line, she would go home automatically). The Biggest Losers of the week were Vicky and Brady of the Brown Team, with a total loss of 2.30% (12 lbs) while the Orange Team fell below the yellow line, by only one pound (Heba managed to lose 8 lbs, but Ed pulled a 0). The Orange team decided to send Ed home, with Heba remaining on campus, joining Coleen now as the only two contestants without their partners.

At home, Ed has done very well, losing over 85 lbs from his starting weight of 335 lbs.

=== Week 5 ===
First aired October 14th, 2008

The temptation is one that could turn the game upside down forever. The contestants were in a room with baked goods. Whoever ate the most calories in 10 minutes would be able to choose the new teams, black and blue. However, the lights were off so no one could see who was eating what. In the end, Heba won the temptation and kept her original team except for switching Phillip to the black team and putting Amy C. into the blue team. The challenge this week was the longest challenge in Biggest Loser history. It lasted for 14 hours. The teams would have to walk up and down the mountain for 14 hours. After they reached the top or bottom of the mountain, they had to take a picture. If all 5 members were in the picture, they would get a bonus point. After several hours, it started to become hotter and hotter. Everyone decided to take a break. Shellay and Colleen wondered if the other team was actually telling the truth. They were thinking of going out during the break to walk but did not. In the end, the black team won the 2 pound advantage at the next weigh in. Also, Brady walked the most out of anyone, by walking 20 miles. Michelle was emotional because she thought her dad wouldn't love her if she loved her mom. Jillian let Michelle talk to her dad and he encouraged her to stay and said she was his inspiration. He thought that what she was thinking was silly and that he loves her. At the weigh in, Ali wonders if Michelle is going to quit, and in the end, Michelle ends up staying. The black team loses a combined total of 30 pounds plus the 2 pound from the challenge. The blue team had to lose more than 33 pounds in order to stay safe. Amy C. lost 9 pounds moving out of the 200s and weighing 199. Brady, Vicky, and Amy P. all lost 6 pounds. The pressure was on Heba and she had to lose more than 6 pounds. Phillip was thinking she would not be able to lose more than 6 pounds, since she had lost 8 pounds the week before. In the end, Heba lost another 8 pounds and the black team had to vote someone out. At an emotional voting ceremony, Colleen had to break the tie breaker between Renee and Shellay, and Shellay was voted out. This was a very tearful elimination. Shellay feels like she is now 30 years old and has continued to work out. Shellay started the competition wearing a size 18 and is now a size 10. Shellay hopes to be a size 6 at the finale.

=== Week 6 ===
First aired October 21, 2008

The Blue Team leaves the ranch with Bob to visit a gym called Absolutions, where the team takes part in self-defense exercises. The Black Team remains on the ranch to try their hand at a rope course, which forces Colleen to attempt to overcome her fear of heights. The challenge this week involves the contestants walking on a circular balance beam above a pool of water. For each revolution completed by a contestant, their respective team earns one point, requiring a total of twenty five points to win. If a contestant loses his or her balance and falls, that person must wait until all other members of both teams also fall into the water before being allowed another attempt. The entire Blue Team falls almost immediately without scoring a single point, while the Black Team manages to keep at least a single member throughout the competition, and eventually wins 25–0. As a prize for victory, the team receives a live conference with loved ones.

At the weigh-in, The Blue Team loses and is forced to go to elimination. Amy P. pleads her case to her group on why she "is not her husband", but Heba and her allies Vicky and Brady still hold a resentment against Phillip. The three friends all decide to vote Amy P. off. Since leaving The Biggest Loser, Amy is now a size 8, and hopes to continue her pursuit of weight loss.

=== Week 7 ===
First aired October 28, 2008

The episode began with the eight remaining contestants meeting Ali outside for this week's temptation, which was a calorie quiz; a revised version of "This or That?". They had to guess which of two foods had fewer calories. If the teams got it right, they would get a point. The first team to five points would win. For the first three rounds, the Blue and Black Teams were tied, but eventually, Blue pulled ahead and won the temptation, and the prize was a 40 lbs advantage, which the teams would learn about later.

The challenge this week consisted of both teams hanging from cranes having to hold up their own body weight. Both teams were able to hold on for about 50 minutes. After 30 minutes, each team had to let one player let go of their weight. The Blue Team chose Vicky, and The Black Team chose Michelle. The black team had to hold up 918 pounds (this included the 40 pound addition the blue team won in the Temptation) and the blue team had to hold up 932 pounds. The blue team won giving them the right to pick one person from the black team to sit out at the weigh in.

Later that week, Heba from the Blue Team is seen getting into another fight with Phillip about him talking about her behind her back, though he is never shown talking about her off-camera. The fight gets so out of control that Colleen goes outside.

At the weigh in the Black team went first. The Blue Team chose Michelle to have her weight not count towards the Black Team's total. Despite this, she only lost 2 pounds. Colleen also lost 2 pounds, and Phillip & Renee both dropped 3 pounds each. Collectively, (and without Michelle) The Black Team lost 8 pounds with a total percentage of 1.18%. The blue team had to lose 11 pounds to win the weigh in.

History was made, as Brady was the first blue team member to weigh in and had dropped 13 pounds, which was more than enough to defeat the entire black team. He became the first person to have a weight loss that was high enough to beat out an entire team. Then Vicky had shed 2 pounds, and Heba & Amy C. also dropped 6 pounds each (Alison also said that percentage-wise, Amy C. was the Biggest Loser so far) The Blue team lost a total of 27 pounds, or 2.9%. Renee of the black team is the biggest loser from her team giving her immunity at the elimination.

At the elimination, the Black Team revealed their votes, with Phillip getting 3 out of the 4 votes. As a result he was eliminated, which left Jillian's Black Team an all-girl Black Team (it also left Brady as the sole man of the ranch).

Meanwhile, the home-footage shows us that when Phillip returned home, he surprised his wife Amy P. (who had been eliminated the previous week) in the mall, with a ring. He proposed to her, and then the two of them remarried there, with their friends & family watching. Phillip has lost over 100 pounds since starting on the ranch.

=== Week 8 ===
First aired November 11th, 2008 due to the election on November 4th

Ali announced that the Blue Team and the Black Team will merge into one team, which means that the competitors will now compete as individuals. All of the eliminated contestants returned to the ranch for a chance to stay, which was decided by a step challenge. If the contestants were to come back solely based on weight loss, Phillip would have been the one to come back, but this was not the case this season.

The person who would be allowed to return was based on the challenge this week that determined who would stay and who would go. The task was simple but difficult. Do 1,000 steps up and down, and the first one to do it would come back into the game and win immunity for the week. In the end, Ed won after being the first to reach 1,000 steps, with Stacey close behind with 987.

At the weigh in, Ali reminded the contestants of the rules: the two individuals with the lowest weight loss percentage would fall below the yellow line and be up for elimination. Ultimately, Brady and Michelle fell under the yellow line and the Black team assumed the Blue Team would stay together and vote Michelle out. Ali told everyone that a twist was going to happen and that it never happened before in Biggest Loser history. After the weigh in, they immediately went to the elimination room and deliberated together about the two contenders up for elimination. Although most of the Blue team was confident, Amy C. voted for Brady, which created a 3–3 tie. Brady was eliminated since he had a lower percentage of weight loss.

Brady started with a size 48 waist and is now a size 34. He has lost 100 pounds and teaches his children healthy ways of eating and exercising. Brady continues to lose weight and hopes to look skinnier at the finale.

=== Week 9 ===
First aired November 18th, 2008

The contestants received a surprise as it was 80's week at the ranch. Vicky plotted revenge against Amy C. after she went against her team and voted-off Brady the previous week. As motivation, Vicky created a sign on her door stating, "Fool me once, shame on you. Fool me twice, shame on me. I will not rest until that lying bitch is out of this house." In the challenge, the contestants had to hold onto a rope attached to large buckets of water over their heads while answering 80's trivia questions. The starting weight of each bucket was equal to 50 percent of that contestant's body weight. If a contestant answered a question incorrectly, water was added to the bucket (in an amount equal to 25 percent of that contestant's body weight). If the contestant answered a question correctly, the contestant could add water to another person's bucket. Michelle won the 80's trivia challenge after promising her mother a new purse if her mother would let go. As a reward, Michelle was allowed to choose between $5,000 or the ability to give a 1-pound penalty to anyone at the weigh-in. She was given until the weigh-in to make her decision. Later, Bob urged the blue team to try to "move forward" and bury the hatchet. Amy C. eventually apologized to Vicky, who accepted her apology, but stated that she still did not trust Amy C. At the weigh-in, Michelle announced that she was giving Vicky the 1 pound penalty. Colleen lost the least, placing her below the yellow line with Vicky, who lost 6 pounds, which was reduced to 5 points with the penalty. Had she not been given the penalty, it would have been Heba below the yellow line instead. Colleen reacted very emotionally in disappointment after learning that she had lost only three pounds, causing Jillian to react very emotionally as well. At the vote, Amy C. decided to join her team in voting off Colleen, who received 3 out of 5 votes, as Michelle and Renee voted for Vicky. Colleen's elimination left the mother-daughter team of Michelle and Renee as the last two members of Jillian's black team.

24 hours later, the home footage shows Colleen celebrating a welcome home party, reuniting her with Jerry, who was previously eliminated 6 weeks ago. She now wears a size 10 dress, lost 51 pounds during the show, hopes to weigh 147 pounds at the finale in her effort to become the winner among eliminated contestants.

=== Week 10 ===
First aired November 24, 2008

It's NFL week at the Biggest Loser ranch, and NFL stars Jerry Rice and Steve Young pay a visit to give the contestants a little challenge of their own: an obstacle course including strength training, catching, running, and tackling. The contestants had to run the course once, and then a second time, and whoever beat their time by the largest margin would win. The contestants were not told about the second trial until after the first trial was finished, to make sure they put forth an honest effort both times. In the end, the winner was Vicky, who held back in the first trial and beat her time by 23 seconds, after realizing that there might be a second trial. For her efforts, Vicky won $50,000 to be donated to the school of her choice to support an NFL sponsored fitness program for children.

The second reward challenge had an NFL theme as well. A football was fired into the air, and the contestants had to catch or retrieve it. Whoever retrieved the ball had the power to put it in any of the other contestants' bins (and as a side bonus, anyone who caught it in mid-air won $500 cash). Once a contestants bin had ten footballs in it, that contestant was eliminated. Vicky won this challenge as well, winning an all-inclusive trip to the 2009 NFL Pro Bowl in Hawaii. Ed won $500 for catching one ball. A few of the contestants were critical of Vicky's behavior during the challenge, in particular when Vicky put a ball in Amy C.'s rack when she had a perfect opportunity to eliminate Ed.

At the weigh-in, Michelle lost 10 pounds (5.38%), which was her best week since the first week, making her the week's Biggest Loser. Amy C. and Heba were both below the yellow line, with Amy C. in last place for the week.

After deliberating in the elimination room, everyone cast their votes. Michelle & Renee voted for Heba, while Ed voted for Amy C. It was up to Vicky. Amy C. believed that since they 'reconciled' last week, Vicky would keep her in, but her dreams were dashed when Vicky revealed that she had made promises to both Heba and Amy C., and ultimately voted for Amy C. Because the votes were tied 2–2, and Amy C. had a lower percentage of weight loss for the week, it was Amy C. who was eliminated.

At home, she's now able to go clothes shopping for regular clothing. She started out as a size 22, and is now a size 8, and hopes to weigh less than 130 pounds at the finale.

=== Week 11 ===
First aired December 2, 2008

The five remaining contestants traveled to New York City, where they received a makeover. After having their hair cut, colored, and styled at the Stuart Hirsch Salon, they met with Christian Siriano at Macy's to pick out new clothes in preparation for their appearance on the Tyra Banks Show. On the show, the revealed their new looks and met with their family members who were there as a surprise. Backstage after the show, the contestants received $1000 gift cards from Macys. The next day, they worked out with their family members at various locations around New York City.

After returning to Los Angeles, the contestants competed in a reward challenge for a two-week trip for two to the Fitness Ridge Resort and Spa in St. George, Utah. The contestants had to wedge themselves in a box suspended fifteen feet above water. Vicky dropped out of the competition first, but did not want to drop due out of fear. Michelle eventually won the competition, but Vicky refused to drop even after the competition was over. She ultimately did jump into the water after receiving encouragement from the other contestants.

At the weigh-in, Ed and Renee had the lowest percentage of weight loss and fell below the yellow line. The Blue team refused to vote for Ed, and it was Renee who was eliminated by a vote of 2 to 1.

At home, Renee has been doing some public speaking and leads a fitness group at her place of employment. Since starting the show has lost a total of 95 pounds and dropped from a size 22 to a size 8. She hopes to be a size 6 by the finale.

=== Week 12 ===
First aired December 9, 2008

Renee's elimination in the previous week left Michelle as the last black team member still on the ranch. While she is distressing over separating with her mother, Vicky, Heba, and Ed celebrate being in the final four. The trainers take the contestants to various spots on the ranch, to help them reflect on how far they've come over the past 12 weeks. Afterwards, Alison shows them a package that contains the clothing that the contestants wore upon first arrival at the ranch. All of the contestants chose to burn this clothing, promising never to return to their original physical condition.

When Vicky told Bob that she had learned a lot about nutrition, she also stated that she did not learn anything about herself. Bob told her that Ryan (the winner of the first season) now weighs at least as much as he did when he first started the show, if not more. Ryan began the show weighing 330 pounds, and lost 122 pounds, or 37% of his body weight back in 2004.

The final weekly challenge involved a reflection upon their past weekly weight losses. The contestants had to run around a race track, carrying the exact number of pounds they've lost since arriving on campus. They each wore various articles of weighted clothing, and after each lap, dropped a piece representing their weight-loss for the corresponding week. They had to run eleven laps, representing the eleven weeks the contestants had been on campus. Michelle and Ed were nearly tied the entire race, but after eleven laps, Ed ultimately emerged victorious and won the Biggest Loser meal plan, along with $10,000.

At the penultimate weigh-in, Michelle lost 9 lbs putting her in first place for the second time and guaranteeing herself a spot in the "Final 3" along with Vicky, who dropped 6 lbs. Heba lost 7 lbs and Ed gained 2 lbs, putting them both below the yellow line. But in a surprising twist, Ali revealed that instead of the contestants making this decision, it would be up to the American public to vote (similar to season 5).

In the confessional, Ed asked that people vote for his wife, Heba, instead of him, saying that she deserved it more than he did, while Heba asked the people to vote for her.

The decision was left to America to choose which one moved on as the third and final contestant competing for the grand prize of $250,000, and the results were revealed during the live finale on December 16, 2008.

=== Week 13 (Finale) ===
First aired December 16, 2008

The finale began with a recap of the entire season, after which Ali revealed who (between Heba and Ed) would be the third finalist in the competition for $250,000. Despite pleading to America to vote for his wife, it was Ed who won, with a whopping 84 percent of America's vote. Heba was "eliminated", which meant that she would be in the competition for the $100,000 prize.

The eliminated contestants were introduced four at a time, starting with Adam & Stacey (Green Team), LT & Tom (Gray Team), Jerry & Colleen (Yellow), and Shellay & Amy C. (Purple). Before the weigh-ins continued, Dr. Robert Huizenga informed Jerry that since starting the show, his health had a dramatic turn around. He started out on 5 different medications, 3 different life-threatening diseases, could barely walk 3 minutes on a treadmill. But since then, he's gotten off of all his medications, he was running 5K's, and he has increased his expected lifespan by 24 years.

The last five contestants were weighed in next: Phillip & Amy P. (Red), Brady (Brown), Renee (Pink), and Heba (Orange). Heba was last to weigh in, and she had dropped 138 pounds from 294, making her the winner of the $100,000 consolation prize.

The final three, Vicky (Brown), Michelle (Pink), and Ed (Orange) changed into their original Biggest Loser uniforms (with the exception of Michelle, who chose to wear her Black shirt). Since Michelle had the highest weight loss percentage of the three, she was allowed to choose the order in which they were weighed.

Ed was the first to be weighed in, and from his starting weight of 335 pounds, had dropped 139 pounds, giving him a weight loss percentage of 41.49%. Vicky was next, and from her starting weight of 246 pounds, she had shed 101 pounds, two pounds short of beating Ed, putting her in second place with 41.06%. Finally, Michelle weighed in, and it was revealed she had dropped 110 pounds, enough to beat Ed, take home the $250,000 prize, and become the second female winner in US Biggest Loser history.

The final results were directly affected by America's vote: Heba had a percentage of 46.94, compared to Michelle's 45.45. If voting had gone the way Ed and Heba wanted, Heba would have been the Biggest Loser, and Amy P., whose percentage was 45.85 would have won the at-home prize.

=== After the Show ===
NBC has announced that there will be another "Did They Keep The Weight Off" special, which will feature more than 40 Contestants from all 7 seasons so far. Those confirmed to appear in the episode include: Finalists Michelle, Vicky, and eliminated contestants Renee, Colleen, Adam, Stacey, Amy C., Shellay, Amy P., Phillip, and Jerry.

On July 7, 2017, Adam Capers died at the age of 48.
