= Isle de Jean Charles, Louisiana =

Island in the United States of America

Isle de Jean Charles
- Unincorporated community
- Location of Isle de Jean Charles in Louisiana Isle de Jean Charles (the United States)
- Coordinates: 29°23′15″N 90°28′59″W
- Country: United States
- State: Louisiana
- Parish: Terrebonne
- Elevation: 2 ft (0.61 m)

Population (2019)
  - Total: 26 families (just over 700 people)
- Time zone: UTC-6 (CST)
  - Summer (DST): UTC-5 (CDT)
- Area code: 985

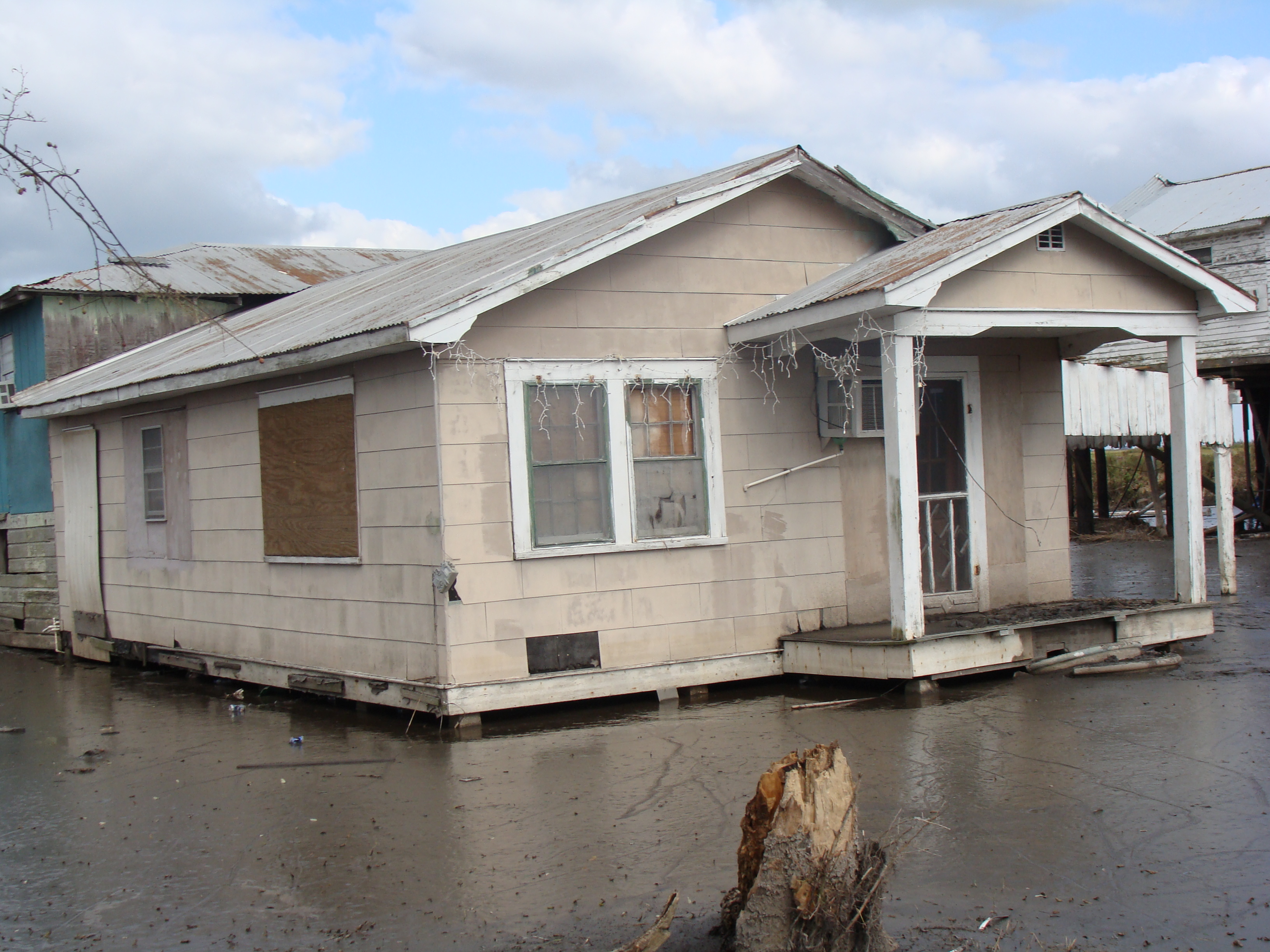
House in Isle de Jean Charles after Hurricane Gustav in 2008.

Isle de Jean Charles (known locally in Louisiana French as Isle à Jean Charles) is a narrow ridge of land situated in Terrebonne Parish, Louisiana. For over 170 years, it has been the historical homeland and burial ground of the state-recognized tribe of the Isle de Jean Charles Band of Biloxi-Chitimacha-Choctaw Indians. Residents of the Island have long been threatened by Louisiana's coastal erosion, as coastal Louisiana loses a landmass the size of Manhattan every year. In 1955, Isle de Jean Charles consisted of over 22,000 acres (8,900 ha) and has since lost about 98% of its land due to saltwater intrusion, and subsidence. In January 2016, the state of Louisiana received substantial funding from the United States Department of Housing and Urban Development to fund a community resettlement that was designed.

== Background ==
In the 1830s, the Biloxi-Chitimacha-Choctaw tribe's ancestors moved to Isle de Jean Charles to escape the Indian Removal Act and the Trail of Tears. By 1910, the island had grown from 16 to 77 families. The population of Jean Charles sustained themselves through fishing, oyster farming, trapping and subsistence farming. In the 1930s, a missionary grade school on the mainland was built for the nearby indigenous peoples. In 1959, Daigleville Indian High School in Houma, 25 miles (40 km) inland from the Isle de Jean Charles, became the first Indigenous high school in Louisiana. Until 1953, when the road that connects the island to the mainland was built, the tribe could commute to and from the inland only by boat. Due to the road's traveling through open waters, it was extremely susceptible to flooding and erosion, and frequently became uncrossable. In the 1940s, companies began offshore oil drilling projects and dredging near the island, activities which contributed to the erosion of the island and its island road. Processes such as fracking hastened land subsidence in Isle de Jean Charles, threatening the land mass.

The Isle de Jean Charles was over 5 miles (8.0 km) wide and 11 miles (18 km) long, but today it has shrunk to 1/4 mile (400 m) wide and 2 miles (3.2 km) long. The causes of land loss have been both natural and man-made. Hurricanes, such as Katrina in 2005, flooded the area with salt water, ruining homes and causing land subsidence. Rising sea levels have also contributed to land loss. The increase of sea level rise due to climate change in the past century has hastened the erosion process for coastal islands such as Isle de Jean Charles. Man made disturbances such as dams and levees as well as the dredging of canals for shipping and oil pipelines all eroded the marshland to almost bare nothingness. Fracking leaves the area vulnerable to land subsidence as the extraction of subsurface materials decreases support for the land, causing it to gradually sink. Levees promote sediment pollution around the area, which furthers a loss of biodiversity among vegetation.

These disturbances have decreased the plant and animal biodiversity in the marshland, negatively impacting the tribe's quality of life. As a result, most of the Biloxi-Chitimacha-Choctaw members who could afford to move off the island have done so. The dispersal of their tribal community disrupted their customs, traditions, and culture. Recent coastal restoration efforts have not been able to salvage the island. The Army Corps of Engineers left the Isle de Jean Charles out of levee projects, in part due to the $100 million additional costs needed to include it in ongoing land preservation projects, thus making the land even more vulnerable to natural disasters than the other surrounding areas. In the early 2000s, only 25 families remained on the island, and the Biloxi-Chitimacha-Choctaw's Chief Albert Naquin began tireless efforts to relocate the entire community to save the tribe's culture and traditions. In 2016, over a decade later, the tribe was finally rewarded with a partial victory. The relocation of Isle de Jean Charles inhabitants reflects the first case of climate migration in Louisiana. The impact of climate change increasing sea level rise and land subsidence in this island have hastened the urgency of Isle de Jean Charles' erosion.

Before the Biloxi-Chitimacha-Choctaw's tribe's victory, an award-winning documentary, Can't Stop The Water, was filmed in 2013 about the community's on-going environmental hardships.

== Community resettlement efforts ==
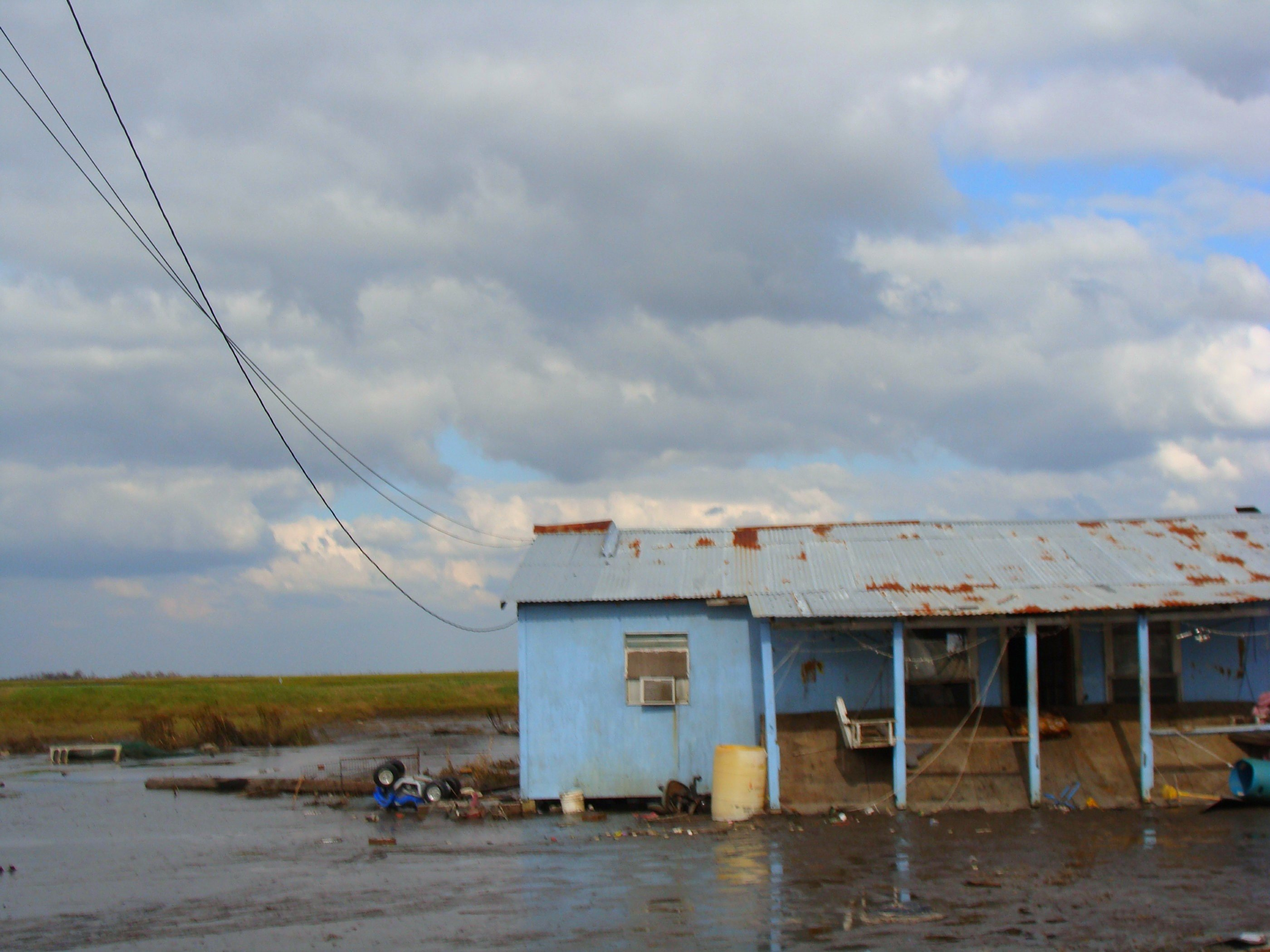
Rising waters on the Isle de Jean Charles

Due to lack of government support for flood mitigation and land restoration, the Isle de Jean Charles Tribal Council decided they needed action and assistance for relocation of their whole community. Traditional Chief Albert Naquin and the Tribal Council have recently seen significant progress towards community resettlement after their 16-year battle of working within the community developing plans, building partnerships, and conducting outreach in order to relocate to higher, safer ground inland. While progress has been made, there have also been multiple setbacks which stalled their momentum.

In 2002, the US Army Corps of Engineers worked with the leadership of the Tribe to identify a nearby site where the community could rebuild.. The USACE hired architects for the relocation proposal, with the idea of maintaining a cohesive community to be consistent with the tribe's federal recognition process.. But when it came time to vote, the majority of people from Isle de Jean Charles did not want to relocate due to their culture's close ties to the land. Some residents felt the government wanted residents to relocate so the oil industry could have free range over the area without political conflict. Conflicts over property and land with the tribe, multinational oil and gas corporations and land developers, had been an ongoing process. The land was a part of their culture and life style. The Biloxi-Chitimacha-Choctaw people wanted to move as an entire community so as to keep their traditions and culture together and alive.

The USACE stated that if the community could find an appropriate property to relocate to, they would grant them funding and reconsider including the community in the hurricane protection system. However, the Louisiana government did not consider the social, psychological, and financial costs associated with moving fishing families inland. The tribe would encounter a great loss of local knowledge and a gain of mental stress of being constantly fighting for their land and traditional lifestyle.

Since 2010, the Isle de Jean Charles Tribe has been working with longtime partners at The Lowlander Center and a team of experts in hazard mitigation, climate adaptation, community planning, architecture, and other relevant fields, to develop their own plan for resettlement. On January 25, 2016, the State of Louisiana received $48 million from the Department of Housing and Urban Development to put towards the Isle de Jean Charles resettlement, as part of the National Disaster Resilience Competition (NDRC).

== Oil and gas production in Terrebonne Parish ==
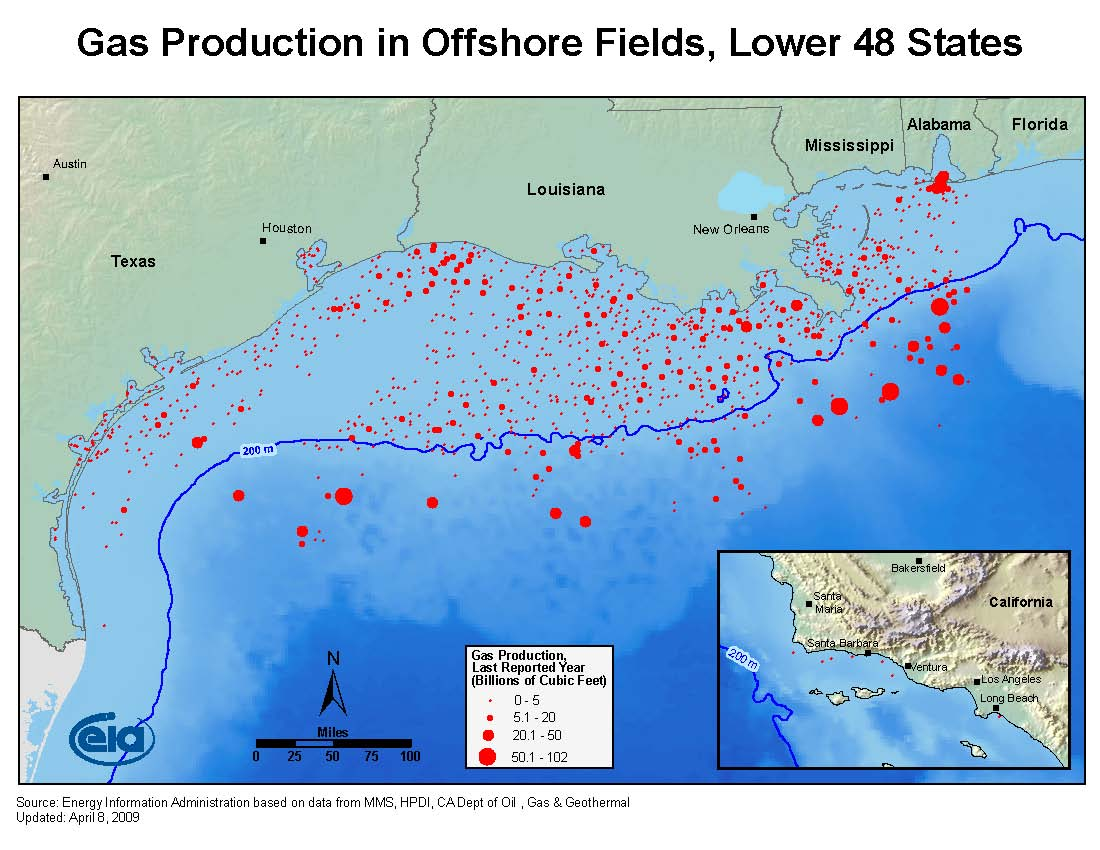
Offshore Oil Drilling in the Gulf of Mexico

Louisiana's Terrebonne Parish has been a prime location for oil extraction and production. Oil and gas production corporations largely influence the coastal communities of Southern Louisiana, with around 90% of land in Terrebonne Parish belonging to non-local manufacturing companies. The Isle de Jean Charles is entrenched in numerous oil fields that are still utilized by oil manufactures. Construction and development of oil-rigs and pipelines continue to disrupt the geography of the wetlands.

=== Discovery of oil ===
In the late 1920s, the Texas-based oil corporation Texaco began exploring the bayous and marshlands of Louisiana in search of oil. Land leases were negotiated between Texaco (and other oil extraction enterprises), the Louisiana Land & Exploration Company, and the state of Louisiana. Oil was first discovered in Terrebonne Parish in 1929. Texaco and other groups quickly monopolized the land in the area.

=== Production levels ===
Oil and natural gas extraction and production rapidly expanded in Terrebonne Parish, reaching an all-time high in the 1960s and 1970s. Peak production reached 31,520,394 Barrel units of oil and 550,018,432 cubic feet (15,574,787.6 m^{3}) of gas in 1977. The OPEC Embargo of 1973 and 1974 influenced this boom, as domestic sources of oil production were particularly desirable and valuable. Oil and gas production levels have steadily fallen since their peak in the late 1970s. In 2014, 3,260,362 Barrel units of oil and 31,100,655 cubic feet (880,672.5 m^{3}) of gas were produced in Terrebonne Parish.

=== Environmental impact ===
In order to facilitate the extraction and transportation of oil and natural gas, the Houma Navigation Canal was built. This man-made waterway connected Terrebonne Parish's largest and only city, Houma, to the Gulf of Mexico and was completed in 1962. It has been thought to have directly contributed to the degradation of the wetlands of southern Louisiana, especially those in Terrebonne Parish. Higher levels of water salinity from the adjacent bay and the increase of artificial waterways, pipelines, and smaller navigation canals have exacerbated the degradation of the wetlands east of the Houma Navigation Canal, where the Isle de Jean Charles is located.

== Education ==
The community is in Terrebonne Parish School District.

Additionally, the non-district public school École Pointe-au-Chien gives preferential admission to residents of Isle de Jean Charles.

== In popular culture ==
- Director Benh Zeitlin of Beasts of the Southern Wild (2012) said in interviews that Isle de Jean Charles was the geographic inspiration for the setting of "The Bathtub," the fictional island portrayed in his film.
- Cottage Films filmed tribal life for years on Isle de Jean Charles for a documentary film called Can't Stop The Water (2013), directed by Rebecca and Jason Ferris.

Sandra Winther directed Lowland Kids about the displacement of the residents. The film features siblings Howard and Juliette and their uncle Chris as they face resettlement as refugees from the isle.
