= Gray, Louisiana =

Gray
- CDP
- Location of Gray in Louisiana
- Coordinates: 29°40′52″N 90°46′53″W
- Country: United States
- State: Louisiana
- Parish: Terrebonne

Area
  - Total: 11.48 sq mi (29.73 km^{2})
  - Land: 11.48 sq mi (29.73 km^{2})
  - Water: 0 sq mi (0.00 km^{2})
- Elevation: 10 ft (3.0 m)

Population (2020)
  - Total: 5,518
  - Density: 480.7/sq mi (185.59/km^{2})
- Time zone: UTC-6 (CST)
  - Summer (DST): UTC-5 (CDT)
- ZIP code: 70359
- Area code: 985
- FIPS code: 22-31180

Gray is a census-designated place (CDP) in Terrebonne Parish, Louisiana. The population was 5,518 in 2020. It is part of the Houma–Bayou Cane–Thibodaux metropolitan statistical area.

== Geography ==
Gray is located at 29°40′52″N 90°46′53″W (29.680993, -90.781414).

According to the United States Census Bureau, the CDP has a total area of 11.6 square miles (30 km^{2}), all land.

== Demographics ==
Historical population
Census	Pop.	Note	%±
1990	4,260		—
2000	4,958		16.4%
2010	5,584		12.6%
2020	5,518		−1.2%
U.S. Decennial Census; 1950 1960 1970 1980; 1990 2000 2010

Gray first appeared as a census designated place the 1990 U.S. census.

Gray racial composition as of 2020
Race	Number	Percentage
White (non-Hispanic)	2,769	50.18%
Black or African American (non-Hispanic)	2,048	37.11%
Native American	151	2.74%
Asian	47	0.85%
Pacific Islander	1	0.02%
Other/Mixed	257	4.66%
Hispanic or Latino	245	4.44%

As of the 2020 United States census, there were 5,518 people, 2,094 households, and 1,370 families residing in the CDP.

== Government and infrastructure ==
Several parish government facilities are in Gray. They include:

- Joseph L. Waitz Emergency Operations Center - It opened in 2017. The state of Louisiana paid $4,340,000 out of the $7,340,000 that was spent to have the facility built.
- The Terrebonne Parish Sheriff's Office headquarters
- The parish animal shelter

== Education ==
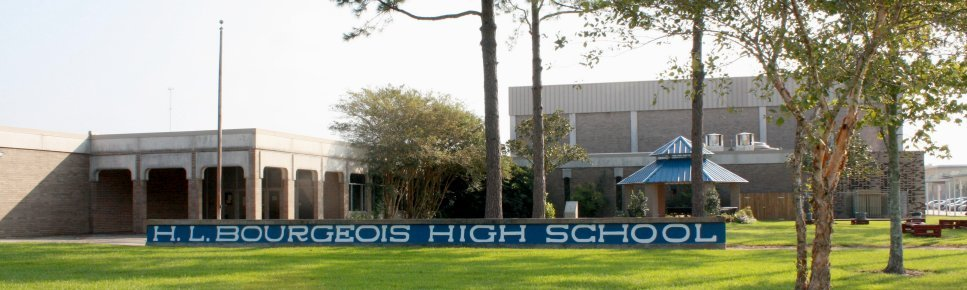
H. L. Bourgeois High School

The school district is Terrebonne Parish School District, as with other locations in the parish.

Public schools include:

- H. L. Bourgeois High School

Private schools:

- Covenant Christian Academy

Terrebonne Parish Public Library operates the North Branch in Gray.

The parish is in the service area of Fletcher Technical Community College. Additionally, a Delgado Community College document stated that Terrebonne Parish was in the college's service area.

== Notable people ==
- Beryl Amedee, member of the Louisiana House of Representatives
- JaJuan Dawson, NFL wide receiver
- Jesse Myles, NFL running back
- Bubba Radio personality
