= Pointe-aux-Chenes, Louisiana =

Unincorporated community in Louisiana, US

Coordinates: 29.49086°N 90.51998°W

Pointe-aux-Chênes ("Oak Point") is an unincorporated community located in Terrebonne Parish, Louisiana, United States. The community shares a zip code with Montegut (70377) and has many residents of Houma descent and others of Chitimacha descent. In 1993, they established the independent Pointe-au-Chien Indian Tribe, which is one of three state-recognized Houma tribes.

== History ==
Pointe-aux-Chenes is home to many members of the United Houma Nation, which was formally recognized by the State of Louisiana in 1990 and whose population of 19,000 is of Houma descent.

The Pointe-au-Chien Tribe members are recognized by the State of Louisiana for educational purposes in Terrebonne Parish and Lafourche Parish state recognized Indian tribe but not federally recognized. The Pointe-au-Chien tribe was formed in 1993 as a breakaway group from the United Houma Nation. Tribal members consider themselves related to the Chitimacha, Choctaw, Acolapissa, and Atakapa.

Since the 1970s, tribal members have become increasingly involved in environmental preservation, as industrialization and dredging by shipping and oil companies have caused extensive damage to coastal wetlands and loss of property. The oil company dredged elsewhere, but the results were still catastrophic. Tribe members say the deep cuts made through the marshes brought in saltwater and led to coastal erosion of the wetlands. That erosion has turned the once abundant oak trees in Pointe-aux-Chenes, which means "Oak Point" in French, into empty husks. Erosion has also turned areas where people once lived into waterlogged marshes or open water. In 2005, Hurricane Rita caused flooding in the town of up to 8 feet (2.4 m) of water to parts of the town.

In 2023, the community was struggling to hold onto remaining members due to coastal erosion, a lack of community amenities, and increasing costs of insuring property.

== Geography ==
Houses in Pointe-aux-Chenes are built on stilts to accommodate seasonal and storm flooding.

== Demographics ==
Many members of the 19,000 strong United Houma Nation live in Pointe-aux-chenes and neighboring Montegut and Isle de Jean Charles. Some members of the 680 strong Pointe-au-Chien Indian Tribe live in the community.

== Education ==
Terrebonne Parish School District operates public schools. The zoned school for the community is Montegut Elementary School in Montegut. The community has a French immersion public school, École Pointe-au-Chien. That school gives preferential admission to Pointe-aux-Chenes residents.

Formerly Point-aux-Chenes Elementary School was in the community. In 2021, the enrollment was around 100. Most of the students were Cajun and Native American, and these students came from French-speaking households. The board of trustees agreed to close the school in 2021. Six board members voted to close the school while three voted against it. Area parents held protests as the board held its closure vote, then sued the district in federal court to attempt to stop the closure. Students were re-assigned to Montegut Elementary School. The Pointe-aux-Chenes school closed, and Hurricane Ida caused damage to the facility.

The lawsuit prompted members of the Louisiana Legislature to consider authorizing a French immersion school. The bill to do so was filed by Tanner Magee, a Republican Party member from Houma. The Louisiana House of Representatives approved that proposal, as did John Bel Edwards, then Governor of Louisiana. The new school opened in 2023. It had plans to relocate to the former Pointe-Aux-Chenes building. The plans were realized after the district sold the school building for one dollar to the Pointe-au-Chien Tribe. In 2024, the enrollment was 9, with Native Americans being the majority.

The parish is in the service area of Fletcher Technical Community College. Additionally, a Delgado Community College document stated that Terrebonne Parish was in the college's service area.
