= Senator Chabert =

Senator Chabert may refer to:

- Leonard J. Chabert (1932–1991), Louisiana State Senate
- Marty J. Chabert (born 1956), Louisiana State Senate
- Norby Chabert (born 1975), Louisiana State Senate
