= Brad Villavaso =

American football coach

Biographical details
- Born: Louisiana

Playing career
- 1985–1988: Nicholls State

Coaching career (HC unless noted)
- 1989–1992: Thibodaux HS (LA) (asst. coach)
- 1993–1995: Nicholls State (LB)
- 1996: St. John HS (LA) (HC/AD)
- 1997–2006: Vandebilt Catholic HS (LA)
- 2007–2008: Ole Miss (asst. coach)
- 2009–2011: Vandebilt Catholic HS (LA) (asst. coach)
- 2012–2013: Vandebilt Catholic HS (LA)

Brad Villavaso is a former college and high school football coach. He was an assistant coach at Ole Miss and Nicholls State University.

He also served as head coach at Vandebilt Catholic High School in Houma, Louisiana and St. John High school in Plaquemine, Louisiana.

== Playing career ==
Villavaso played football and is an alumnus of Nicholls State University.

== Coaching career ==
Villavaso started his coaching career at Thibodaux High School in Thibodaux, Louisiana. He then moved on to Nicholls State as outside linebackers coach from 1993 to 1995. Villavaso's first head coaching position was at St. John High School in Plaquemine, Louisiana during the 1996 season where he also served as athletic director. He then became head coach at Vandebilt Catholic High School from 1997 to 2006.

Villavaso was a graduate assistant at Ole Miss from 2007 to 2008 under coaches Ed Orgeron and Houston Nutt. He returned to Vandebilt Catholic High School as an assistant coach from 2009 to 2011 and accepted the head coaching position starting with the 2012 season. He resigned from his position as head coach on November 4, 2013.
