= Carl W. Bauer =

American politician (1933–2013)

Carl Wiegmann Bauer

Louisiana State Representative for St. Mary Parish
- In office 1966–1972
- Preceded by: Spencer G. Todd
- Succeeded by: V.J. Bella

Louisiana State Senator for District 21 (Assumption, St. Mary, St. Martin, and Terrebonne parishes)
- In office 1972–1976
- Preceded by: Harvey Peltier Jr.
- Succeeded by: Anthony Guarisco Jr.

Personal details
- Born: Carl Packard Wiegmann; October 4, 1933 Centerville, St. Mary Parish, Louisiana, US
- Died: June 11, 2013 (aged 79) Lafayette, Louisiana, US
- Cause of death: Cancer
- Party: Democratic
- Spouses: Divorced from Jane Colvin Bauer Desonier; Mary Jane Peacher Bauer (born c. 1949, married c. 1980–2013, his death)
- Relations: Ralph Norman Bauer and Margaret Wooster Bauer (adopted parents)
- Education: Louisiana State University; Louisiana State University Law Center
- Occupation: Lawyer; Lobbyist; Businessman

Carl Wiegmann Bauer (October 4, 1933 – June 11, 2013) was a lawyer and businessman who served as a Democrat in both houses of the Louisiana State Legislature from 1966 to 1976 and capped his career as the chief lobbyist, specifically the "Coordinator of Governmental Relations," for the University of Louisiana at Lafayette.

== Background ==
Born Carl Packard Wiegmann in rural Centerville in St. Mary Parish in south Louisiana, Bauer, also known by the nickname "Wimpy", was the third son of Fred and Mary Packard Wiegmann. After his parents divorced, Carl was placed in foster care at the age of five in Alpine in Brewster County in southwestern Texas. A foster mother, Elma Wooster Boudreaux, cared for Carl until he was twelve. He was then adopted by a distant cousin and Elma's niece, Margaret Wooster Bauer, and her husband, Ralph Norman Bauer, both lawyers in their middle forties and childless. As a teenager, Carl was reared in Franklin, the parish seat of St. Mary Parish. His father, a leading figure in anti-Long politics in Louisiana, served as a member of the Louisiana House from 1928 to 1936 and again from 1940 to 1948. He was the Speaker for his last two terms during the administrations of Governors Sam Houston Jones and Jimmie Davis. In 1929, as a freshman lawmaker, Ralph Bauer led the "Dynamite Squad" which sought to impeach and remove Governor Huey Pierce Long Jr., from office, but Long was spared conviction in the state Senate.

In 1951, Bauer graduated from Franklin Senior High School. He then studied at Louisiana State University in Baton Rouge and in 1955 completed his first year at the LSU Law School. An alumnus of the LSU Reserve Officer Training Corps program, he was called into active duty in the United States Air Force. Bauer was trained as a navigator at Ellington Air Force Base in Houston, Texas. Until his release from duty in 1957, he was stationed in Waco, Texas, Panama City, Florida, and Sacramento, California. He thereafter finished his legal studies at LSU and joined the law firm Bauer and Bauer, named for his father and his uncle, Theodore Bauer.

== Public career ==
In 1966, freshman state Representative Spencer G. Todd of St. Mary Parish died in office. Bauer won the special election to fill the remaining two years in the term. He was then elected in 1968 to a full term in the state House. His House service coincided with the administration of Governor John McKeithen. In 1972, voters elevated him to the state Senate for a single term, and he served alongside future Lieutenant Governor Paul J. Hardy of St. Martin Parish. As a representative, Bauer was among sponsors of the 1971 law that created Acadiana as an official cultural and regional designation recognized by the state government.

Bauer worked to four-lane U.S. Route 90. During the 1990s, he was the chairman of the Governor's Interstate 49 Task Force while also a member of the Greater Lafayette Chamber of Commerce. During this time U.S. 90 from Interstate 10 in Lafayette to New Orleans was officially designated as the future route of Interstate 49 South. The task force successfully argued that the upgrading of U.S. 90 to interstate standards would accommodate the south Louisiana energy industry and ease hurricane evacuation. The upgrade also prevents highway crashes that occur from crossovers and signals along U.S. 90.

A few months after he entered the state Senate, in which he served alongside Claude B. Duval of Houma, Bauer ran in an open election for Louisiana's 3rd congressional district for the seat vacated by fellow Democrat Patrick T. Caffery, who stepped down after only two terms in office. He led the primary by 262 votes in an eight-candidate field, but he lost the runoff election to attorney and later Judge J. Louis Watkins Jr., of Houma in Terrebonne Parish. Watkins was then defeated in the 1972 general election by David C. Treen, then of Jefferson Parish, the first Republican in the 20th century to represent Louisiana in Congress. Seven years later Treen was elected as the first Republican governor of his state since Reconstruction. Treen and a Republican "search committee" had offered to support Bauer for the House seat in 1972 if the Democrat would switch parties, but Bauer remained Democrat and expected to face Treen in the general election.

Bauer served as the chief lobbyist for twenty years at ULL, when he retired in 2010. Ray Authement, the former university president, termed Bauer "one of the most effective leaders, as far as grants and contracts, that we ever had."

Bauer served on the boards of several financial institutions and a sugar-processing company. In addition to the Chamber of Commerce, Bauer was affiliated with many organizations over the years, including the Louisiana Bar Association, the Lafayette Economic Development Association, the Louisiana Enterprise Center, the Gulf and Great Plains legal foundations. In 1968, Bauer was named president of the LSU Foundation; he was later a member of the board of the USL Foundation. He was affiliated with the Boy Scouts of America and was a long-term member and past board chairman of Goodwill Industries of Acadiana. He was a member of the Masonic lodge, the Shriners, and Rotary International.

== Death ==
Ray Authement termed Bauer "courageous" for his struggles with cancer and failing eyesight. The loss of vision required that he learn to use a computer for the visually impaired.

Bauer died at the age of seventy-nine. He was twice married, first to the former Jane Colvin, later Jane Desonier, from whom he was divorced, and second to the former Mary Jane Peacher, a Realtor whom he married c. 1980. He had six children, four from his first marriage and two from Mary Jane's former marriage to a man named "Heymann": Carla R. Bauer, of Atlanta, Georgia; Margaret Donovan Bauer of Greenville, North Carolina; Irene Colvin Bauer Casper and her husband, Trevor Allen Casper, of Lafayette; Theodore Norman "Ted" Bauer and his wife, Cassie, of Lafayette; Kelli Claire Heymann Dautreuil and her husband, Bryan, of Cecilia, Louisiana, and Blake Ronald Heymann and his wife, Kristi, of New Orleans. There were eight grandchildren. Bauer donated his body to medical science. A memorial service was held on June 14, 2013, at Asbury United Methodist Church in Lafayette.

Preceded by Spencer G. Todd	Louisiana State Representative for St. Mary Parish; Carl Wiegmann Bauer; 1966–1972	Succeeded by V.J. Bella
Preceded by Harvey Peltier Jr.	Louisiana State Senator for District 21 (Assumption, St. Mary, St. Martin, and Terrebonne parishes); Carl Wiegmann Bauer; 1972–1976	Succeeded by Anthony Guarisco Jr.
