= Louisiana's 20th State Senate district =

American legislative district

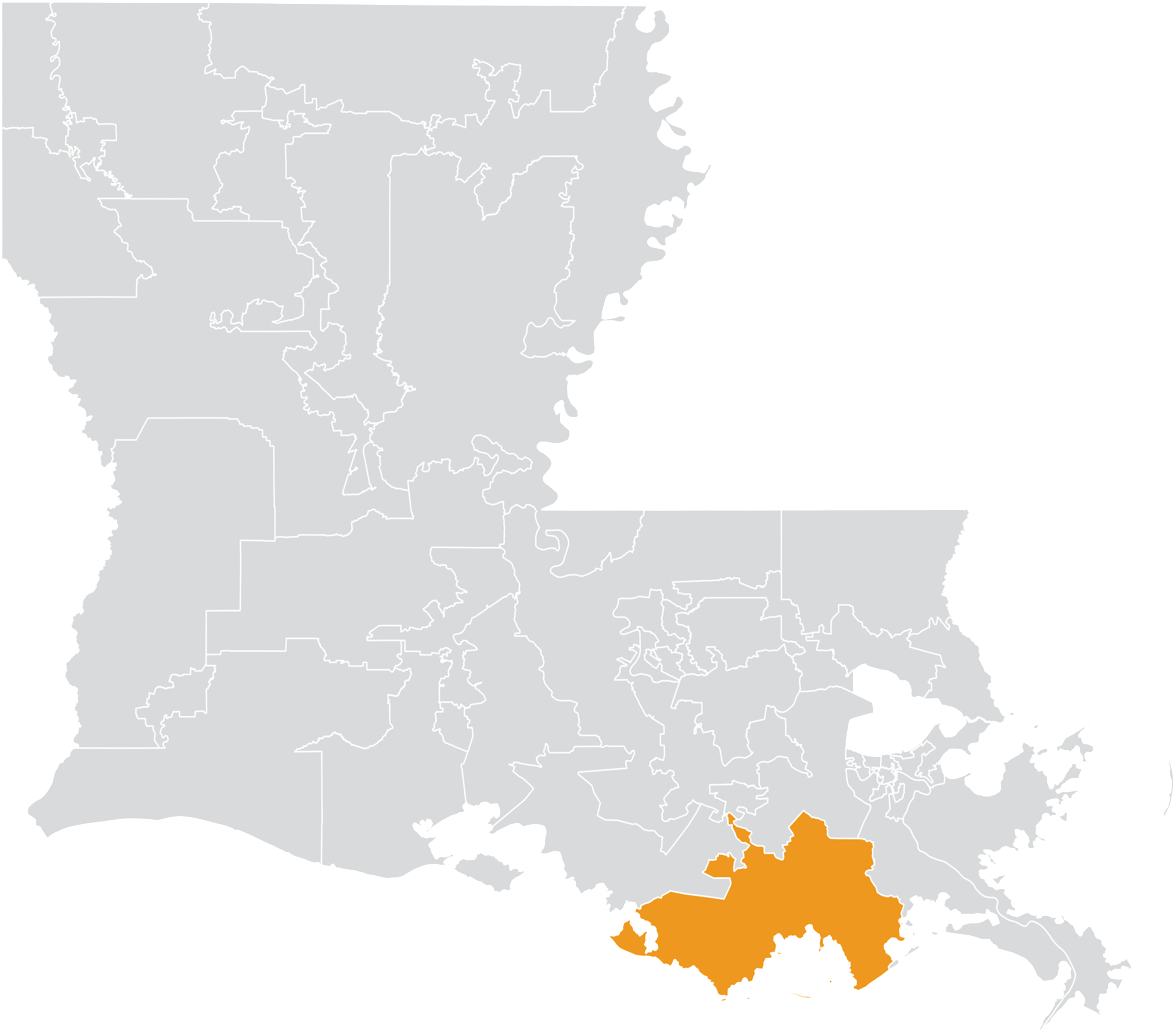
Senator
Mike Fesi; R–Houma
- Registration: 36.3% Democratic; 33.4% Republican; 30.3% No party preference
- Demographics: 72% White; 13% Black; 5% Hispanic; 1% Asian; 6% Native American; 3% Other
- Population (2019): 113,481
- Registered voters: 63,726

Louisiana's 20th State Senate district is one of 39 districts in the Louisiana State Senate. It has been represented by Republican Mike Fesi since 2020, succeeding fellow Republican Norby Chabert.

== Geography ==
District 20 is located in Lafourche and Terrebonne Parishes along the Gulf of Mexico, including some or all of Thibodaux, Lockport, Cut Off, Golden Meadow, Houma, Dulac, and Chauvin.

The district overlaps with Louisiana's 1st and 6th congressional districts, and with the 51st, 52nd, 53rd, 54th, and 55th districts of the Louisiana House of Representatives.

== Recent election results ==
Louisiana uses a jungle primary system. If no candidate receives 50% in the first round of voting, when all candidates appear on the same ballot regardless of party, the top-two finishers advance to a runoff election.

=== 2019 ===
2019 Louisiana State Senate election, District 20
Party	Candidate	Votes	%
Republican	Mike Fesi	15,546	54.5
Republican	Damon Baldone	5,162	18.1
Democratic	Jerry "Truck" Gisclair	4,070	14.3
Democratic	Brenda Leroux Babin	2,785	9.8
Republican	Shane Swan	974	3.4
Total votes		28,537	100
Republican hold			

=== 2015 ===
2015 Louisiana State Senate election, District 20
Party	Candidate	Votes	%
Republican	Norby Chabert (incumbent)	11,921	51.1
Republican	Mike Fesi	9,944	42.6
Independent	Mark Atzenhoffer	1,456	6.2
Total votes		23,321	100
Republican hold			

=== 2011 ===
2011 Louisiana State Senate election, District 20
Party	Candidate	Votes	%
Republican	Norby Chabert (incumbent)	Unopposed	100
Total votes		Unopposed	100
Republican hold			

=== Federal and statewide results ===
Year	Office	Results
2019	Governor (runoff)	Rispone 79.7–18.9%
2020	President	Trump 59.7–37.8%
2016	President	Trump 77.1–19.9%
2015	Governor (runoff)	Vitter 58.9–41.1%
2014	Senate (runoff)	Cassidy 63.3–36.7%
2012	President	Romney 72.8–25.1%
