= V. J. Bella =

American politician

Vincent Joseph "V. J." Bella

Louisiana State Representative for District 50 (Iberia and St. Mary parishes)
- In office 1972–1990
- Preceded by: At-large members: (1) Carl W. Bauer (2) J. Richard "Dickie" Breaux (3) Helen L. Laperouse
- Succeeded by: Jack D. Smith

Louisiana State Fire Marshal
- In office 1990–1992
- In office 1996–2004

Personal details
- Born: July 29, 1927 (age 98) Patterson, Louisiana
- Party: Republican
- Children: 7
- Parent(s): Joseph John and Loreta L. Bella
- Occupation: Firefighter; businessman

Vincent Joseph Bella, known as V. J. Bella (born July 29, 1927), is a former member of the Louisiana House of Representatives for District 50 in Iberia and St. Mary parishes, whose service extended from 1972 to 1990. Thereafter, Bella served in Baton Rouge as the appointed state fire marshal from 1990 to 1992 and again from 1996 to 2004. As a representative, Bella was a pioneer in fire sprinkler legislation.

Louisiana House of Representatives
Preceded by At-large members: Carl W. Bauer; Richard J. "Dickie" Breaux Helen L. Laperouse	Louisiana State Representative for District 50 (Iberia and St. Mary parishes); Vincent Joseph "V. J." Bella; 1972–1990 (alongside Ted Haik, Elward Thomas Brady, Jr., J. Burton Angelle, Jesse J. Guidry, J. Richard Breaux, and Harry L. Benoit)	Succeeded by Jack D. Smith
