= Terrebonne Parish Library System =

Library service in Louisiana, US

The Terrebonne Parish Library System (TPLS) is the public library system that serves the residents of Terrebonne Parish with headquarters in Houma, Louisiana. The system is made up of seven locations, with a main library in central Houma and six branches throughout the Terrebonne Parish. Library staff also reach the community through the outreach programs Reading Well, which is geared towards local early childhood centers, and Reading Forever, which partners with local assisted living facilities and nursing homes.

As of the 2020 United States census, the Terrebone Parish Library System serves over 100,000 people and according to the State Library of Louisiana circulates over 400,000 books, CDs and digital downloads annually.

== History ==
The Terrebonne Parish Library System originates from a small social club founded in the late 1920s. The club opened to the public with 428 donated books and Sylvia Ray Johnson as its first librarian. The collection would continue to grow with the support of the City Government, Police Jury, School Board, and private donors. After its first location was sold the library was forced to move to several locations until finally settling in a renovated wooden house on the corner of Roussell and Verret. This location would officially establish the Terrebonne Parish Public Library.

After a successful tax-election with the theme, "A Library Says a Lot about a Community," funds were raised for the new main library that opened in 2001.

== Branches ==
There are currently seven branches located throughout the Terrebonne Parish area with the main library centered in the city of Houma, Louisiana.

=== Main Library ===
The Main Library is located in central Houma. The Terrebonne Parish Library Genealogy Collection is housed on the second floor. This location is also home to the Creative Lab, where patrons 15 years and older have access to 3-D printers, cutting machines, sewing machines, a serger, lightboxes, a laminator, and assorted handcraft tools.

=== Chauvin Branch ===
Located in Chauvin, southeast of Houma and offers a variety of arts and craft programs for patrons, as well as access to books, computers, and genealogy e-resources on site.

=== Dulac Branch ===
Located in Dulac, south of Houma and offers arts and craft programs, local creative group gatherings, and family programs such as movie time.

=== Dularge Branch ===
Located south of Houma and facilitates a book club, local creative groups, and STEAM programs for children. This location also hosts weekly storytimes and free play programs for families.

=== East Houma Branch ===
Located east of Houma and facilitates a variety of programs for healthy living, quiet time to study, arts and crafts, and local community groups.

=== Gibson Branch ===
Located in Gibson, west of Houma and hosts several book clubs, local community groups, and storytimes.

=== North Branch ===
Located north of Houma in Gray, Louisiana and is a popular meeting space for a variety of local community groups. This location also hosts storytimes, arts and crafts for all ages, and STEAM programs.

== Genealogy Research ==
The Terrebonne Parish Library system houses an extensive local genealogy collection, as well as general resources across several states. The library system also allows researchers access to well-known online genealogy databases such as Ancestry.com, HeritageQuest, Fold3 History, and Sanborn Digital Maps through free in-library connection.
