= Reggie Dupre =

American politician

Reggie Paul Dupre, Jr. (pronounced du-PRAY) was born 1957 in Bourg, Louisiana, to Alida D. Naquin and Reggie Dupre Sr. Effective 2009 July 1, Reggie Dupre became director of levees for Terrebonne Parish, Louisiana.

At the time of his selection by the Levee Board, Reggie Dupre was a Democratic state senator for District 20 (Houma area), to which he was first elected in a special election in February 2001. He submitted his resignation on June 2, 2009, to state senate president Joel Chaisson, to take effect at close of business on June 30.

Dupre is a former member of the Louisiana House of Representatives for House District 53, to which seat he was first elected in 1999.

Dupre is a 1976 honor graduate of South Terrebonne High School. He completed a B.A. in political science from Louisiana State University in 1979 and worked for 5 years in the Terrebonne Parish Sheriff’s Department, receiving a Certificate from the Police Training Academy at Nicholls State University in 1981. He received a juris doctor from the Loyola University New Orleans School of Law in 1995 and entered the practice of law. Dupre is married and has three grown children and, as of 2009, two grandchildren. He is a parishioner of Saint Charles Borromeo Roman Catholic Church and a 3rd Degree Knight in the Knights of Columbus (Council 8616). He belongs to the Montegut and Bourg volunteer fire departments. Dupre is also in the supermarket business as owner of the independent Bourg Supermarket in Bourg, Louisiana.

Louisiana governor Bobby Jindal called a Louisiana Senate District 20 special election for 2009 July 10 to choose Dupre's successor.

== See also ==
- List of Knights of Columbus members
