= Patrick T. Caffery =

American politician (1932–2013)

Patrick Thomson "Pat" Caffery, Sr.
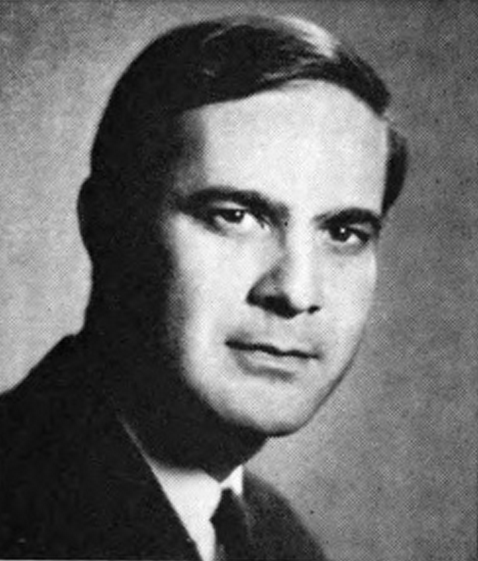

Member of the U.S. House of Representatives from Louisiana's 3rd district
- In office January 3, 1969 – January 3, 1973
- Preceded by: Edwin E. Willis
- Succeeded by: David C. Treen

Louisiana State Representative from Iberia Parish
- In office 1964–1968
- Preceded by: Fred V. Decuir
- Succeeded by: At-large delegation: J. Richard "Dickie" Breaux; Carl W. Bauer Lionel Laperouse, Jr.

Personal details
- Born: July 6, 1932 St. Mary Parish, Louisiana, U.S.
- Died: December 17, 2013 (aged 81) New Iberia, Louisiana, U.S.
- Resting place: Beau Pre Cemetery in Jeanerette, Louisiana
- Party: Democratic
- Spouse: Anne Leontine Bercegeay (married 1954-2013, his death)
- Children: Patrick, Jr., Kevin M., and Michael M. Caffery; Six grandchildren
- Parent(s): Ralph Earl and Letitia Decuir Caffery
- Education: University of Louisiana at Lafayette; Paul M. Hebert Law Center
- Occupation: Attorney

Patrick Thomson Caffery, Sr., known as Pat Caffery (July 6, 1932 – December 17, 2013), was an attorney from New Iberia, Louisiana, who formerly served as a Democrat in the Louisiana House of Representatives from 1964 to 1968 and then as a U.S. representative from Louisiana's 3rd congressional district from 1969 to 1973.

== Early life ==
Patrick Thomson Caffery, Sr. was born in St. Mary Parish in South Louisiana. His great-great-great-grandfather, Colonel John Donelson, was the co-founder of the City of Nashville, Tennessee. His great-great-great uncle, Andrew Jackson, served as the President of the United States. His grandfather, Donelson Caffery, served as a United States Senator. Pat Caffery was born at Haifleigh Plantation in St. Mary Parish and reared in the parish seat of Franklin. He was the eleventh of twelve children of Ralph Earl Caffery and the former Letitia Decuir. An Eagle Scout, he was selected in 1950 in a nationwide competition by the Boy Scouts of America to present a "State of the Nation" report in the White House to then U.S. President Harry S. Truman.

He graduated in 1955 from Southwestern Louisiana Institute (now the University of Louisiana at Lafayette), having been awarded a music scholarship. He was an accomplished trumpet player and was named as coronet soloist with the SLI Stage Band. In 1956, he received a law degree from the Paul M. Hebert Law Center at Louisiana State University in Baton Rouge. He was the managing editor of the Louisiana Law Review.

== Career ==
Caffery defeated fellow Democrat Edwin E. Willis, a 20-year incumbent, and a committee chairman, in the primary election held in August 1968. Two years earlier, Willis had survived the challenge waged by the Republican oilman Hall Lyons of Lafayette, the younger son of GOP state chairman Charlton Lyons.

In 1970, at the behest of Governor John McKeithen, U.S. Senator Russell Long (who considered Caffery a formidable challenger to his U.S. Senate seat) and U.S. Representative Edwin Edwards, (who feared a challenge by Caffery in Edwards' planned 1971 gubernatorial race) the Louisiana Legislature gerrymandered Caffery's district to remove his stronghold of Lafayette Parish (moving it to Edwards' 7th District) and replace it with portions of Jefferson Parish, in which they thought he would fare poorly.

In spite of this opposition from the Democratic political machine, Caffery polled extremely well in Jefferson Parish and even more so in the rest of the district and easily defeated the Machine candidate, State Senator Jules Mollere of Jefferson Parish in the 1970 Democratic Primary. Caffery ran without opposition in the general election in both 1968 and 1970.

Caffery did not seek a third term in 1972 and returned to his law practice in New Iberia. His seat then went Republican with the victory of future Governor David C. Treen, who had lost three House elections in the 1960s in Louisiana's 2nd congressional district. In defeating the Democrat J. Louis Watkins, Jr., of Houma in Terrebonne Parish, Treen became the first Republican to represent a Louisiana district in the U.S. House since Hamilton D. Coleman held the Second District seat from 1889 to 1891.

== Personal life ==
In 1954, Caffery married Anne Leontine Bercegeay of Charenton in St. Mary Parish. There are three Caffery sons, Patrick, Jr., Kevin, and Michael.

== Death ==
Caffery died in New Iberia at the age of eighty-one a week before Christmas, 2013. He is interred at Beau Pre Cemetery in Jeanerette in Iberia Parish.

== Notes ==
Preceded by Fred V. Decuir	Louisiana State Representative from Iberia Parish; 1964–1968	Succeeded by At-large delegation: J. Richard "Dickie" Breaux, Carl W. Bauer, Lionel Laperouse, Jr.
U.S. House of Representatives
Preceded by Edwin E. Willis	Member of the U.S. House of Representatives from Louisiana's 3rd congressional district 1969–1973	Succeeded by David C. Treen
