= Marty J. Chabert =

American politician

Marty James Chabert

Louisiana State Senator from District 20 (Terrebonne and Lafourche parishes)
- In office 1992–1996
- Preceded by: Leonard J. Chabert
- Succeeded by: Michael Robichaux

Personal details
- Born: April 12, 1956 (age 70) Terrebonne Parish, U.S. Louisiana, USA
- Party: Democratic
- Spouse: Elodie Brown Chabert
- Relations: Father Leonard J. Chabert; Brother Norby Chabert
- Education: Vandebilt Catholic High School; Nicholls State University
- Occupation: Businessman

Marty James Chabert (born April 12, 1956) is a businessman from Houma, Louisiana, who is a Democratic former member of the Louisiana State Senate. He served a single term from 1992 to 1996 to succeed his father, Leonard J. Chabert, also a Democrat, who died in office in 1991. His younger brother, Norby Chabert, a Democrat-turned-Republican, now holds this same District 20 seat, which encompasses Terrebonne and Lafource parishes.

Chabert's mother is the former Viona Lapeyrouse; both parents were born in Chauvin in Terrebonne Parish. He graduated from Vandebilt Catholic High School in Houma and attended Nicholls State University in Thibodaux in Lafourche Parish. As of 1996, he was the president of Mallard Pipe Testing & Tool Rental, Inc. He has also worked for Louisiana State University in Baton Rouge and the Houma Courier.

Chabert ran unsuccessfully in 1983 for the District 53 seat in the Louisiana House of Representatives before he won the Senate race eight years later upon his father's death. Chabert did not seek reelection in the nonpartisan blanket primary in 1995 and was succeeded by fellow Democrat Michael Robichaux.

On February 2, 2013, the Chaberts, Leonard J., Marty J., and Norbert N., were inducted into the Louisiana Political Museum and Hall of Fame in Winnfield, along with several other individuals, including the late State Senator Charles C. Barham and George Dement, the former mayor of Bossier City.

Louisiana State Senate
Preceded by Leonard J. Chabert	Louisiana State Senator from District 20 (Terrebonne and Lafourche parishes); Martry James Chabert; 1992–1996	Succeeded by Michael Robichaux
