= Senator Dupre =

Senator Dupre or Dupré may refer to:

- Reggie Dupre (born 1957), Louisiana State Senate
- Jacques Dupré (1773–1846), Louisiana State Senate
