= Leonard J. Chabert =

American politician (1932–1991)

Leonard Joseph Chabert, I

Louisiana State Senator from District 20 (Terrebonne and Lafourche parishes)
- In office March 1980 – 1991
- Preceded by: Claude B. Duval; Anthony Guarisco, Jr.
- Succeeded by: Marty James Chabert

Louisiana State Representative from District 53, including Terrebonne Parish
- In office 1972 – March 1980
- Preceded by: Gerald F. Lofaso
- Succeeded by: Murray J. Hebert

Personal details
- Born: November 18, 1932 Chauvin; Terrebonne Parish; Louisiana, USA
- Died: September 26, 1991 (aged 58)
- Party: Democratic
- Children: inter alia: Marty James Chabert; Norby Chabert
- Occupation: Businessman

Leonard Joseph Chabert, I (November 18, 1932 – September 26, 1991), of Houma, Louisiana, served in each house of the Louisiana State Legislature. He was born in rural Chauvin in Terrebonne Parish in South Louisiana.

== Political career ==
Chabert served in the Louisiana House of Representatives from 1972 to 1980, along with Dick Guidry, Morris Lottinger, Jr., and Elward Thomas Brady, Jr., who represented other districts which included a portion of Terrebonne Parish. He served in the Louisiana State Senate from District 20 from 1980 until 1992.

In 1983, Chabert won his second term in the Senate in a general election race against fellow Democrat, Glenn F. Voisin, 19,530 votes (55.2 percent) to 15,862 (44.8 percent). In 1987, Chabert was again forced into a second race with Glynn Voisin. The third-place candidate, Elward Brady, had switched to the Republican Party and finished with 19.6 percent of the vote in the nonpartisan blanket primary. In the general election, he defeated Voisin once again but narrowly, 17,419 (51.5 percent) to 16,405 (48.5 percent).

Chabert died near the end of his third Senate term and was succeeded for one term by his son, Marty James Chabert, who won easily over Republican Paul E. Brown. A younger son, Norby Chabert of Houma, was elected to the same seat in a special election held in August 2009, upon the resignation of Reggie Paul Dupre, Jr., who had succeeded Marty Chabert in 1996. Like his father and brother, Norby Chabert held Democratic Party allegiance.

In 2011, however, Norby Chabert switched to the Republican Party, which had already become the majority in the chamber.

== Chabert Medical Center ==
Leonard Chabert was employed at some point after 1988 and prior to his death at the Pennington Biomedical Research Center in Baton Rouge.

The Leonard J. Chabert Medical Center in Houma, a regional acute-care facility, is named in his honor. The center began in 1978 as a teaching hospital providing clinical training to medical students and physicians. In 2009, LJCMC completed a study of patients with heart failure. Some 42 percent of the patients there are Medicaid recipients. LJCMC is a surgical facility too; it has 156 beds.

In his Senate campaign, Norby Chabert recalled his father's dedication to bringing the Chabert Medical Center to Acadiana:

Not only did my father bring the Impossible Dream of a charity hospital to the bayou region, but he fought every session, not only to have it funded, but he fought to keep its very doors open. He knew what it was like to grow up poor and have no health care. ... It was his life's mission to take care of the sick and the uninsured of the bayou region. Upon his death, his legacy of fighting for the medical center was rewarded by having "his hospital" renamed in his honor. ... Chabert Medical faces the same deep cuts that used to keep my father awake at night wondering how he would overcome the funding shortfalls that threatened its closure. ...

== Louisiana Political Hall of Fame ==
On February 2, 2013, the Chaberts, Leonard J., Marty J., and Norbert N., were inducted into the Louisiana Political Museum and Hall of Fame in Winnfield, along with several other individuals, including the late State Senator Charles C. Barham of Ruston, a former Leonard Chabert colleague, and George Dement, the former mayor of Bossier City in northwestern Louisiana.

Preceded by Gerald F. Lofaso	Louisiana State Representative from Terrebonne Parish; Leonard Joseph Chabert, I 1972—1980	Succeeded by Murray J. Hebert
Louisiana State Senate
Preceded by Claude B. Duval; Anthony Guarisco, Jr.	Louisiana State Senator from District 20 (Terrebonne and Lafourche parishes); Leonard Joseph Chabert, I 1980–1991	Succeeded by Marty J. Chabert
