= Anthony Guarisco Jr. =

American politician

Anthony Joseph Guarisco Jr.

Louisiana State Senator for District 21 (Assumption, St. Mary, St. Martin, and Terrebonne parishes)
- In office 1976–1988
- Preceded by: Carl W. Bauer
- Succeeded by: Murphy J. "Mike" Foster Jr.

Personal details
- Born: September 29, 1938 (age 88) Morgan City, St. Mary Parish; Louisiana, USA
- Party: Democratic
- Spouse(s): (1) Sherry Perdue Guarisco (married 1968, divorced) (2) Sherry Lynelle Spivey Guarisco
- Children: From first marriage: Carla Maria Guarisco; Anthony Guarisco, III Belinda P. Guarisco
- Education: Nicholls State University Loyola University New Orleans Law School; University of New Orleans Louisiana State University
- Occupation: Lawyer; Real estate businessman

Anthony Joseph Guarisco Jr., sometimes known as Tony Guarisco (born September 29, 1938), is a Democratic former member of the Louisiana State Senate from Morgan City in St. Mary Parish in south Louisiana. He represented Senate District 21 from 1976 to 1988, which included the parishes of St. Mary, Assumption, Terrebonne, and St. Martin, two precincts only.

== Background ==
Guarisco is an American/Italian dual citizen as well as a citizen of the European Union, whose father was Anthony J. Guarisco, Sr. (1910–2002); his mother, the former Nathalie Verret (1913-1991). The Guariscos are a large extended Sicilian American family in Morgan City. One of their progenitors, Victor Guarisco (1879-1972) established a large shrimp company in Morgan City and later the Gulf Marine Drilling Company to build offshore oil supply boats.

In 1960, Guarisco received his Bachelor of Science in business administration from Nicholls State University in Thibodaux, Louisiana. In 1966, after three years of study he received his law degree from Loyola University in New Orleans, where he was a member of Delta Theta Phi. While in law school, he was President of the Student Bar Association, Chief Justice of the Judicial Court of Honor and received Honorable Mention on the Moot Court team. He was admitted to the bar in 1966. He also studied political science in 1977 and 1978 at the University of New Orleans. Years later from 2008 to 2012, he studied at Louisiana State University and obtained a Master of Arts in liberal arts, while still practicing law and engaged in real estate. Well into his seventies, he served for five months as a student body senator in 2012 at LSU.

On February 24, 1968, in the Sacred Heart Catholic Church in Morgan City, Guarisco married the former Sherry Perdue, the daughter of Theodore Paul Perdue, Jr., and the former Peggy Palmer, both of Morgan City. She too graduated from Nicholls State University and became a classroom teacher.

At the time of his marriage, Guarisco was affiliated with the Morgan City law firm Levy, Burleigh, Russo and Bourg. In a 1974 murder case, Guarisco successfully obtained the first verdict of "Not guilty by reason of insanity" in Louisiana criminal law history.

== Political races ==
In 1972, Guarisco was elected on a non-partisan ballot as a delegate to the 1973 Louisiana Constitutional Convention held in Baton Rouge. where he served on the Declaration of Rights Committee.

He first won his seat in the 1975 election, the first in Louisiana under the nonpartisan blanket primary format, and served three four-year terms. To win the seat, he defeated State Representative Elward Thomas Brady Jr., of Houma in Terrebonne Parish, who had worked to control the damage from the 1973 Mississippi River floods.

In 1978, Guarisco successfully sponsored a bill to permit physicians in Louisiana to prescribe marijuana for therapeutic use glaucoma or in treatment by chemotherapy. Cases involving paralysis were later added. Governor Edwards signed Guarisco's bill into law. The Marijuana Control Board was created to monitor the law, but that panel never functioned and was abolished, along with many other inactive boards and commissions, in a 1989 law signed by Governor Buddy Roemer.

In 1980, Guarisco ran in a special election for Louisiana's 3rd congressional district, a position vacated by incoming Republican Governor David C. Treen. The two major candidates were State Representative Billy Tauzin, then a Democrat but later a Republican from Thibodaux and newly turned Republican Jim Donelon of Jefferson Parish, the current state insurance commissioner who had run unsuccessfully for lieutenant governor in the 1979 general election when he was defeated by fellow Democrat Robert "Bobby" Freeman of Plaquemine in Iberville Parish. Guarisco, considered a social liberal because of his earlier support of the failed Equal Rights Amendment to the United States Constitution, and Bob Namer, then a conservative Democrat, rounded out the four-candidate field. Treen endorsed Donelon, who switched parties on February 20. Treen's predecessor (and successor) as governor, Democrat Edwin Edwards, supported Tauzin, a former floor leader in the House. Edwards had first told Donelon, his former aide, that he would not become involved in the race, but Edwards changed his mind when Treen took an active stance for Donelon. Tauzin also had the support of Lieutenant Governor Freeman, U.S. Senator Russell B. Long, and Representative John Breaux from then Louisiana's 7th congressional district, who had succeeded Edwards in the U.S. House in 1972 and would follow Long in the Senate in 1987.

In the special congressional race, Guarisco carried the support of the New Orleans Times-Picayune and said that he did not want the support of either Treen or Edwards, adding that he was "independent of all that." In the first round of balloting on April 19, Guarisco was eliminated; he polled 8,927 votes (10.7 percent). Donelon led Tauzin 2.2 percentage points; both ran up large margins in their home parishes, but Tauzin fared much better in Lafourche than had Donelon in Jefferson Parish. In the runoff election on May 17, Tauzin prevailed, 53.1 to 46.9 percent.

Guarisco created and served as the first Senate parliamentarian, designed a process for confirming gubernatorial appointees. He founded the Endowed Chairs for Eminent Scholars program in higher education and the LSU Endowment for Excellence, pioneered admission standards for LSU, and laws regarding open meetings and public records. He was the lead author on legislation to prevent punitive damages on the press. In 1981, he was the floor manager for the impeachment and removal of state Senator Gaston Gerald of Greenwell Springs, convicted of extortion.

In 1983, Guarisco won his third term in the Senate, 59-41 percent over fellow Democrat John L. Hadel.

Guarisco was unseated in 1987 by the businessman and future Governor Murphy J. "Mike" Foster Jr., then a Democrat but after 1995 a Republican. In that same election, Buddy Roemer was elected governor, and Foster won all four parishes in the district to unseat Guarisco, 24,183 (64 percent) to 13,599 (36 percent).

== Guarisco today ==
Guarisco maintained a law practice at 266 Seyburn Drive in Baton Rouge, but it is unclear if he still has a law office at this address. He works primarily in personal injury, criminal defense, and mediation. Previously Guarisco served briefly on the boards of both the former Guaranty Bank and Trust Company and Citizen's Bank in Morgan City.

Prior to 2011, Guarisco was the manager and minority owner of the former Guarisco-Evans Shopping Center located next to the Medicine Shoppe in Morgan City. Faced with condemnation and the expense of renovation, Guarisco sold the dilapidated structure to businessman Sidney Moffett, who declared the property structurally sound and pledged to restore it to use.

Guarisco, the owner since 1996 of Guarisco Enterprises LLC, and his second wife, the former Sherry Lynelle Spivey (born c. 1951), the owner of SSG Consulting Services, live in Baton Rouge. Guarisco has three children from his first marriage to the former Sherry Perdue: Carla Maria Guarisco, Anthony Guarisco, III, and Belinda P. Guarisco.

Preceded by Carl W. Bauer	Louisiana State Senator for District 21 (Assumption, St. Mary, St. Martin, and Terrebonne parishes); Anthony Joseph Guarisco Jr. 1976–1988	Succeeded by Murphy J. "Mike" Foster Jr.
