= Hunt Downer =

American politician (born 1946)

Secretary of the Louisiana Department of Veterans Affairs
- In office 2004–2008
- Governor: Kathleen Blanco
- Preceded by: Joey Strickland
- Succeeded by: Lane Carson

Speaker of the Louisiana House of Representatives
- In office 1996–2000
- Preceded by: John Alario
- Succeeded by: Charles W. DeWitt Jr.

Member of the Louisiana House of Representatives from the 52nd district
- In office 1976–2004
- Preceded by: Elward Thomas Brady Jr. Morris Lottinger Jr.
- Succeeded by: Gordon Dove

Personal details
- Born: April 28, 1946 (age 80) New Orleans, Louisiana, U.S.
- Party: Democratic; Republican
- Education: Nicholls State University (BS); Loyola University New Orleans (JD)

Hunt Downer (born April 28, 1946) is an American politician. He served as a Democratic member of the Louisiana House of Representatives.

== Life and career ==
Downer was born in New Orleans, Louisiana. He attended Nicholls State University and Loyola University New Orleans. He served in the United States Army Reserve.

Downer served in the Louisiana House of Representatives from 1976 to 2004.

Downer was a major general of the Louisiana National Guard. He previously served as the Secretary of the Louisiana Department of Veterans Affairs from 2004 until 2008.

In 2010 he attempted to be selected as the Republican candidate for Louisiana's 3rd congressional district but was defeated by Jeff Landry.
