= Morris Lottinger Jr. =

American politician

Morris Albert Lottinger Jr.

Louisiana State Representative from District 52, including Terrebonne Parish
- In office 1971–1975
- Preceded by: Cleveland J. Marcel Sr.
- Succeeded by: Hunt Downer Leonard J. Chabert John J. Siracusa

Personal details
- Born: c. 1937 Houma, Terrebonne Parish; Louisiana, USA
- Party: Democratic
- Spouse: Yvonne U. Lottinger (married 1960)
- Relations: Morris Lottinger Sr.
- Children: Including: Therese L. Wickham; Stephanie L. Irwin Morris Lottinger, III
- Education: Nicholls State University; Louisiana State University Law Center
- Occupation: Retired judge

Morris Albert Lottinger Jr. (born c. 1937), is a retired judge who previously served from 1971 to 1975 as a Democratic member of the Louisiana House of Representatives from his native Houma in Terrebonne Parish in South Louisiana.

Lottinger is one of three children born to the former Effie J. Hellier and the attorney Morris Lottinger Sr. In the 1940 United States census, then listed as two years of age, Lottinger was residing with his parents and his older sister Elizabeth in the home of his maternal grandfather, Harry W. Hellier and his uncle, Harry F. Hellier.

Lottinger received his bachelor's degree from Nicholls State University in Thibodaux in Lafourche Parish. He completed Louisiana State University Law Center and was admitted to the bar in 1965. He is a member of Phi Delta Phi, the international legal honor society.

In the House, Lottinger joined with colleague Elward Thomas Brady Jr., also of Houma, in an effort to adopt boater-safety regulations proposed by the United States Coast Guard, but many constituents objected to the U.S. government dictating policy regarding their boats. Years later, those same safety guidelines were adopted.

In 1976, Representative Lottinger was named "Conservationist of the Year" among the elected official category by the Louisiana Wildlife Federation.

Lottinger left the state House after five years to become a judge of the Louisiana First Circuit Court of Appeal, which includes his Terrebonne Parish. He retired from the judgeship as chief judge on July 15, 1998. Like his father, he was hence both a state representative and a judge. The senior Lottinger was also House Speaker for the last two years of his legislative service.

Preceded by Cleveland J. Marcel Sr.	Louisiana State Representative from Terrebonne Parish; 1971–1976	Succeeded by Hunt Downer; Leonard J. Chabert; John J. Siracusa
