= Ray Authement =

American university president (1928–2020)

5th President of the University of Louisiana at Lafayette/University of Southwestern Louisiana
- In office 1974–2008
- Preceded by: Clyde Lee Rougeou
- Succeeded by: E. Joseph Savoie

Academic Vice-President of the University of Southwestern Louisiana
- In office 1966–1973

Personal details
- Born: Ray Paul Authement; November 19, 1928 near Chauvin, Louisiana, U.S.
- Died: April 5, 2020 (aged 91) Lafayette, Louisiana, U.S.
- Party: Democratic
- Spouse: Barbara Braud Authement
- Children: 2
- Education: University of Louisiana at Lafayette (BS); Louisiana State University (MA, PhD)
- Occupation: College president; mathematics professor

Ray Paul Authement Sr. (November 19, 1928 – April 5, 2020) was an American academic administrator and the longest-serving university president in the United States. From 1974 to 2008, he was the fifth president of the University of Louisiana at Lafayette, formerly known as the University of Southwestern Louisiana in Lafayette, Louisiana.

== Background ==
Authement was born near Chauvin in a rural section of Terrebonne Parish to Elias Lawrence Authement and the former Elphia Marie Duplantis; both parents were natives of Terrebonne Parish and born in 1904. In 1950, Authement received his bachelor's degree from UL Lafayette. He subsequently procured both a master's degree in 1952 and a Ph.D. in mathematics in 1956 from Louisiana State University in Baton Rouge.

Authement and his wife, the former Barbara Braud (born c. 1932), had two daughters, Kathleen A. Prouet, who died in 1999 of leukemia and Julie A. Johnson of Lafayette.

He began his career in higher education on the LSU faculty in 1954. He was also a former faculty member at McNeese State University in Lake Charles and the University of North Carolina at Chapel Hill, North Carolina. Prior to his UL Lafayette presidency, Authement taught mathematics and was thereafter the academic vice-president of Southwestern Louisiana from 1966 until 1970.

== UL Lafayette presidency ==
Under Authement, UL Lafayette launched a $130 million construction program, moved from open enrollment in the manner of a community college to selective admissions, and joined NCAA Division 1, the highest level of collegiate athletic competition. In 1990, he hired the lawyer and former state legislator Carl W. Bauer as the chief lobbyist, or "Coordinator of Governmental Relations," for UL Lafayette, and the two worked together to expand the campus and modernize the institution. Bauer remained at UL Lafayette two years after Authement retired.

Authement worked to develop Ph.D. programs in the fields of computer science, mathematics, English, and history. UL Lafayette became the state's second largest university in enrollment - surpassed only by LSU - and the first public university in Louisiana to obtain a Doctoral II ranking. In 1997, he initiated a drive to increase private endowments to $75 million, which made possible the establishment of 20 endowed chairs worth $1 million each, 217 endowed professorships, and many scholarships. There is also a "super chair" valued at $2 million.

During the Authement years the Cajundome, the popular basketball complex which seats 12,800, was constructed along with Oliver Hall, a $10 million computer science building. Cajun Field, a.k.a. "The Swamp", home of the Ragin' Cajuns football was also built almost ten years into Authement's tenure. UL Lafayette developed University Research Park, the National Wetlands Research Center, and the Louisiana Immersive Technologies Enterprise, which promotes economic development through innovation in digital media . The Edith Garland Dupré library was fully renovated. Newer campus buildings include the Paul and Lulu Hilliard University Art Museum, Moody Hall (the B. I. Moody III College of Business Administration), Legacy Park student apartments, an indoor athletic training facility, and a 400-vehicle parking garage at the busy intersection of Girard Park Drive and St. Mary Boulevard.

== Legacy ==
UL Lafayette under Authement became an economic force within Acadiana and gained national attention in the fields of computer science, environmental and biological research, and French studies. The Carnegie Foundation designated UL Lafayette as a "research university with high research activity", comparable to Baylor, Clemson, and Auburn universities.

The Ray P. Authement Valedictorian Scholarship is available through UL. The Ray P. Authement College of Sciences at UL is named in his honor. UL Lafayette presents the Dr. Ray Authement Excellence in Teaching Award to a faculty member. In 2009, Authement was named the UL Lafayette president-emeritus; he still taught mathematics classes again at UL Lafayette after leaving the presidency of the institution.

Louis J. Michot, the Lafayette businessman who served in the Louisiana House of Representatives from 1960 to 1964, ran for governor of Louisiana in the 1963 Democratic primary election, and served as the state education superintendent from 1972 to 1976, described Authement, prior to retirement from ULL, accordingly:

In spite of all the things he must have put up with in 30-something years, he's still there. ... In a political climate like Louisiana, he stayed head of a public institution for one-third of a century. He must have been doing something right.

Raymond "Coach" Blanco, a former ULL dean of students and the husband of former Governor Kathleen Babineaux Blanco said that Authement, who was in competition with presidents from other state institutions, such as F. Jay Taylor and Dan Reneau of Louisiana Tech University and Rene J. Bienvenu of Northwestern State University, for limited available funds, "never believed in going down and playing the [lobbying] game in Baton Rouge. He always thought that if you did what you're supposed to do and had the merit that you would get rewarded. And sometimes that worked, and sometimes it didn't ..."

In reality though, Authement was like most college presidents a politician but not the kind who places his name on a ballot. He developed close ties to the local political elite, having met on occasion with the late Lafayette Mayor J. Rayburn Bertrand and Sheriff Carlo Listi. Authement also established a close friendship with the clothing merchants, the brothers Edward and Herbert Abdalla, all of these interactions even before he became ULL president.

Former Governor Blanco said of Authement:

He had great academic vision. He knew how to drive areas of excellence. And that takes a lot of fortitude. There's a lot of campus politics that goes on. He had to convince that faculty, and they understood and went along with his program that achieving areas of excellence would bring the university out of being a little country school with limited vision and limited education for its students and into the modern world. And they understood that and supported it. That's very hard to do. There are many campuses that have never been able to get that far down the road.

In retirement, Authement and his wife resided in Lafayette.

== Death ==
On April 5, 2020, Authement succumbed to an "extended illness" at the age of 91 in Lafayette. Due to the COVID-19 pandemic, the family will have a celebration of life at a later date.

Preceded by Clyde Lee Rougeou	President of University of Louisiana at Lafayette; 1974–2008	Succeeded by Joseph Savoie
