= Edward Douglas White Catholic High School =

- E. D. White High School

Location
- 555 Cardinal Drive; Thibodaux, (Lafourche Parish), Louisiana 70301; United States; 29°47′36″N 90°48′37″W

Information
- School type: Private, Co-educational college preparatory
- Religious affiliation: Roman Catholic
- Established: 1965
- President: Tim Robichaux
- Principal: Michelle Chiasson
- Grades: 8–12
- Gender: co-educational
- Colors: Cardinal and gray
- Mascot: Northern cardinal
- Nickname: Cardinals
- Rival: Vandebilt Catholic High School, Thibodaux High School
- Accreditation: Southern Association of Colleges and Schools
- Newspaper: Cardinal Courier
- Affiliation: Louisiana High School Athletic Association
- Website: www.edwhite.org

Edward Douglas White Catholic High School, also known as E. D. White High School, is a private, Roman Catholic junior and senior high school in Thibodaux, Louisiana in the Diocese of Houma-Thibodaux. It is named for Edward Douglass White, ninth Chief Justice of the United States and native of Lafourche Parish.

== Athletics ==
Edward Douglas White Catholic athletics competes in the LHSAA.

Sports offered:

- Football
- Baseball
- Volleyball
- Cross Country
- Tennis
- Track
- Soccer
- Basketball
- Softball
- Swimming
- Golf
- Bowling
- Fishing Team
- Wrestling

E.D. White also offers a marching arts program:

The E.D. White Cardinal Vanguard is 2024 LMEA Class 3A State Champions receiving outstanding scores and awards in overall music, percussion, guard, and general effect. They competed in the 2024 BOA Southeastern Regional in which they placed second in their class and 11th overall. They made a televised appearance in the 2024 National Cherry Blossom Parade. They offer programs for marching band, indoor percussion, winter guard, symphonic concert band, and jazz band.

=== Championships ===
Football championships

- (2) State Championships: 1968, 1969

=== Football ===
Football rivals
Vandebilt Catholic High School: As the only two Catholic high schools in the Houma-Thibodaux area, the football rivalry between E.D. White and Vandebilt has a long-running history. Students of both schools often support their respective teams fervently, even if they have no interest in the sport.

Thibodaux High School: Thibodaux High and E.D. White share the same town. The football rivalry is known as "The Battle for Thibodaux." The first meeting for this battle was in 2007 with the Cardinals winning 30–14. In 2008, the Tigers claimed victory with a 13–3 score over the Cardinals. The teams usually compete against each other in the Thibodaux Jamboree to this day.

== Campus ==
Facilities

E.D. White has facilities for academic, athletic, and extracurricular activities. The E.D. White campus is composed of the main building, the Père-Ménard building (which houses the EDW Media Center and the Academic Enhancement Center), the Preston LeJune Gymnasium, the Cardinal baseball field, the Cardinal softball field, the football field, the St. Teresa music hall, the student union, and the Dr. Richard Morvant Gymnasium.

Improvements, renovations, and new projects have been completed to further the quality of education at the school. All English classrooms have had Smart Boards installed and the science laboratories have been updated as well.
