= Marilyn Kilgen =

American microbiologist and seafood safety scientist

- Born: August 7, 1944 (age 82); Lafourche Parish, Louisiana, US
- Spouse: Ronald H. Kilgen
- Children: 3

Academic background
- Education: B.A., 1966, Biology, Nicholls State University; PhD., 1970, Microbiology, Auburn University
- Thesis: Ultrastructure of some homiothermic viruses in a permanent poikilothermic cell line from the fathead minnow (Pimephales promelas) (1970)

Academic work
- Discipline: Biology
- Institutions: Nicholls State University
- Main interests: Microbiology and virology of seafood

Marilyn Gayle Barrios Kilgen is an American microbiologist and seafood safety scientist. She is the Alcee Fortier Distinguished Service Professor Emeritus at Nicholls State University.

== Personal life and education ==
Growing up, Kilgen thought about becoming a doctor but changed her plans after her mother died of breast cancer. She chose to attend her father's alma mater for post-secondary education, Nicholls State University.

Kilgen received her bachelor's degree in science from Nicholls State University in 1966 before earning her doctorate in microbiology from Auburn University in 1970. As a freshman at Nicholls State University, Kilgen studied under Professor Samuel Burton "Burt" Wilson III who left an impact on her academic future. At the time of his death in 2004, she stated that Wilson "left her better prepared for graduate school than many students from larger universities." After returning from her graduate studies, she worked alongside Wilson in the biology department as a fellow professor.

She married her husband Ronald H. Kilgen. Before his death in 2018, they had three children together.

== Career ==
Kilgen returned to Nicholls State University as a professor on August 23, 1971 after completing her graduate studies. In 1977, she served as the Pre-Professional Medical Association's faculty adviser. She became head of the biology department in 1994 while working three terms as a U.S. Secretary of Agriculture appointee. As Department Head, Kilgen created the University's first master's degree program in marine and environmental biology. The year of its creation, Kilgen helped the university procure a boat for marine and environmental biology. The boat was named after Deanna Bonvillain, Kilgen's former administrative assistant. In 1997, Kilgen was approached by Oysterman Ernie Voisin of Motivatit Seafoods in Houma to help him research high-pressure water processing and its potential for killing food-borne bacteria. Together, they discovered that intense hydrostatic pressure killed the bacterium while also leaving the oyster shucked. This allowed workers to no longer shuck oysters by hand, therefore improving labor costs. After Hurricane Katrina, Kilgen began advocating for the university to fund a seafood institute. That same year, she was selected for the Louisiana Center for Women in Government and Business Hall of Fame. Later in 2009, the federal government agreed to spend more than $325,000 to help create a seafood institute at the university. She eventually stepped down as Department Head to become the Director of the Institute for Seafood Studies.

In 2011, Kilgen helped the university acquire a 25-foot research boat to survey oyster beds in the Barataria-Terrebonne estuaries. The boat, named after the late Samuel Burton "Burt" Wilson III, was procured using $350,000 in donated funds. The following year, Kilgen retired from teaching and was honored by the university with emeritus status. She also sat on the 2012 Louisiana Center for Women in Government and Business Hall of Fame committee. On November 2, 2013, the university dedicated the microbiology lab #208, which Kilgen used to teach cell biology, in her honor. In 2019, Kilgen was appointed to the Nicholls Alumni Federation 2019–2020 Board of Directors. She also sits on the Committee On Evaluation Of The Safety Of Fishery Products.
