= Elward Thomas Brady Jr. =

American politician (1926–2007)

Louisiana State Representative for District 52, including Terrebonne Parish
- In office 1972–1976
- Preceded by: Gerald F. Lofaso
- Succeeded by: Hunt Downer Leonard J. Chabert John J. Siracusa

Personal details
- Born: September 9, 1926 New Orleans, Louisiana, USA
- Died: April 6, 2007 (aged 80) Houma, Terrebonne Parish; Louisiana, USAL
- Resting place: Magnolia Cemetery in Houma
- Party: Democratic
- Occupation: Businessman

Military service
- Branch/service: United States Army Air Forces
- Rank: Airplane mechanic
- Battles/wars: World War II: Pacific Theater of Operations

Elward Thomas Brady Jr. (September 9, 1926 – April 6, 2007), was a businessman from Houma in Terrebonne Parish, Louisiana, who served in the Louisiana House of Representatives from 1972 to 1976 during the first term of Governor Edwin Edwards. He is best remembered for his work against flooding of the Atchafalaya River.

== Background ==
Brady was born in New Orleans but moved with his parents to Bayou Dularge in Terrebonne Parish when he was fourteen years of age. During World War II, he served in the United States Army Air Forces as an airplane mechanic in the Pacific Theater of Operations. Once back in Houma, he joined Brady Engine Company, an oilfield supply firm operated by his father.

== Political career ==
In 1971, prior to regular two-party competition, he was nominated in the Democratic primary election to represent state House District 52, which includes part of Terrebonne Parish.

In less than a year in the legislature, Brady faced the challenge of the 1973 Mississippi River floods, which weakened the Old River Control Structure of the Atchafalaya River. The situation created a threat to Morgan City, located in St. Mary Parish but within Brady's district. Each morning Brady was taken by helicopter from his home on Bayou Dularge to confer with Governor Edwards regarding the flooding. For his work in this venue Brady received the Louisiana Cross of Merit. After much politicking, he convinced Edwards of the need of a bridge at Bayou Dularge over the Intracoastal Waterway, but even after the structure was completed, many of Brady's constituents felt it should have also included a span across the Houma Navigation Canal. Brady also worked to adopt United States Coast Guard boater-safety regulations, but many constituents objected to the U.S. government dictating such policy. Ultimately, those same safety guidelines were implemented.

Brady worked with the Louisiana State Police to investigate financial irregularities at the Louisiana Superdome. Morris Lottinger Jr., a retired judge of the Louisiana First Circuit Court of Appeal who served with Brady in the legislature, described his friend as "the consummate legislator. He was very serious about what he did. As far as I know, he never missed a vote unless it was absolutely necessary."

Brady did not seek reelection in the first ever nonpartisan blanket primary held in Louisiana on November 1, 1975, but instead he ran unsuccessfully for the Louisiana State Senate in District 21, which includes Morgan City. Fellow Democrat Anthony Guarisco Jr., an attorney and native of Morgan City, won the election. Guarisco held the seat for three terms but was unseated in 1987 by future Governor Murphy J. Foster Jr. Brady later challenged the Representative-turned-Senator Leonard J. Chabert of Chauvin in Terrebonne Parish but lost once more. Brady's tenure in the Louisiana House of Representatives was marked by hands-on crisis response, infrastructure advocacy, and fiscal oversight, particularly in relation to flood protection and state-funded development projects like the Louisiana Superdome.

== Civic activities ==
As the chairman of the Budget and Finance Committee of Terrebonne General Medical Center in Houma, Brady was one of the few businessmen on the board. Lottinger recalls that Brady worked to bring the hospital up to "the cutting edge of medical technology."

In 1981, Brady left the family engine company, but two years later founded with his son, Timothy Patrick Brady of Houma, a new company, Brady Diesel. He served on the board of Terrebonne Savings and Loan Association, First National Bankshares, and First National Bank of Houma. Socially, he was active in such groups as the Terrebonne Sportsman's League and the Houma Terrebonne Carnival Club.

Brady died at the age of eighty. His parents were Elward Brady Sr. and the former Elmire Louise Kranz. In addition to his son, Brady was survived by his wife, the former Barbara Robichaux (c. 1924–2012), a daughter of Millard and Ivy Prince Robichaux and a native of Franklin in St. Mary Parish. The Bradys also had a daughter, Ellie Brady Skillman of Baton Rouge, and five grandchildren. The couple is interred at Magnolia Cemetery in Houma.

Preceded by Gerald F. Lofaso	Louisiana State Representative for Terrebonne Parish; Elward Thomas Brady Jr. 1972–1976	Succeeded by Hunt Downer Leonard J. Chabert John J. Siracusa
