= Mike Fesi =

American politician and businessman

Michael A. Fesi, Sr.

Member of the Louisiana Senate from the 20th district
- Incumbent
- Assumed office January 13, 2020
- Preceded by: Norby Chabert

Personal details
- Born: May 20, 1959 (age 67)
- Party: Republican
- Spouse: Carla
- Children: 4
- Profession: Oil & gas businessman
- Website: Campaign website

Michael "Big Mike" A. Fesi, Sr. (born May 20, 1959) is an American politician and businessman from the state of Louisiana. A Republican, Fesi has represented the 20th district in the Louisiana State Senate since 2020.

== Career ==
Prior to serving in elected office, Fesi worked as an oil and gas businessman, founding Pipeline Construction and Maintenance Inc. in 1996. Fesi continues to serve as the company's president, and additionally owns Kid Energy USA.

== Political career ==
In 2015, Fesi ran for State Senate against incumbent Republican Norby Chabert, but lost to Chabert in the first round of voting with 43% of the vote. With Chabert term-limited in 2019, Fesi ran for the same seat once again, this time defeating four other candidates with 54% of the vote.

In May 2021, Fesi announced he had tested positive for COVID-19 after appearing at meetings with his colleagues.
