= Elkins Hall =

Historic college building in Louisiana, United States

- Francis T. Nicholls Junior College Main Building
- U.S. National Register of Historic Places
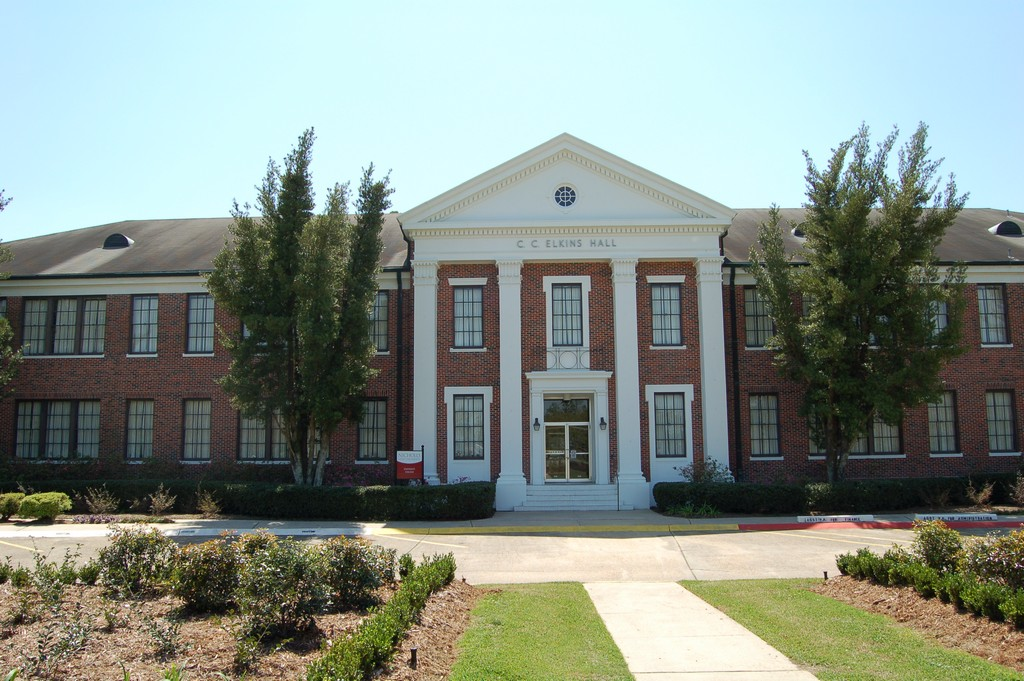

- Location within Louisiana Location within the United States
- Location: Nicholls State University campus, Thibodaux, Louisiana
- Coordinates: 29°47′40″N 90°48′06″W
- Area: 9 acres (3.6 ha)
- Built: 1948
- Architect: Favrot and Reed
- Architectural style: Classical Revival
- NRHP reference No.: 99000184
- Added to NRHP: February 12, 1999

Elkins Hall is a historic administrative building located on the north side of the campus of Nicholls State University fronting Bayou Lafourche. It was the first building constructed on the campus of what was then known as Francis T. Nicholls State College.

== History ==
Ground was broken for the construction of Elkins Hall in 1947, and was first used during the 1948–1949 school year. Originally, it was called simply the Main Building, and housed the college's administrative offices, classrooms, laboratories, cafeteria, bookstore, and library. As more buildings were added to the campus, the building was used more exclusively for administrative offices.

The building was named for Dr. Charles Calvert Elkins (1900–1963), founding dean of Francis T. Nicholls Junior College. In 1956, the school was separated from Louisiana State University and designated it a four-year institution, renamed Nicholls State College. Elkins served as its first President from 1956 until his retirement in 1963. Following his death later that year, the building was renamed Charles Calvert Elkins Hall in his honor in 1964.

Elkins Hall building and a 9 acres (3.6 ha) area comprising the lawn and circular drive in front of it were added as Francis T. Nicholls Junior College Main Building to the National Register of Historic Places on February 12, 1999.

== Design ==
Elkins Hall is a two-story brick building built in the Classical Revival style of architecture. It was designed by the New Orleans–based architectural firm Favrot and Reed (now known as Mathes Brierre). In keeping with the Classical Revival style, the building is two rooms deep and features a rectangular floorplan and gable-fronted roof. The front of the building includes a white two-story portico with a triangular pediment featuring a circular window, supported by four columns on square bases. The central upper window features an ornamental wrought iron balustrade.

Renovations over the years have added an elevator (1983) and two additional wings known as Candies Hall (1986) and Picciola Hall (1978), which connect to Elkins Hall via covered walkways.

== See also ==
- National Register of Historic Places listings in Lafourche Parish, Louisiana
- Neoclassical architecture

== Works cited ==
- Architecture--Nicholls State University--Buildings, Vertical file, Nicholls State University Archives, Thibodaux, La.
- Architecture--Nicholls State University--Elkins Hall, Vertical file, Nicholls State University Archives, Thibodaux, La.
- Delehaye, Alfred N. (2005). Nicholls State University: The Ayo Years, 1980-2003. Thibodaux, La.: Nicholls State University Foundation.
- Harris, Cyril (2006), "Classical Revival Style," Dictionary of Architecture and Construction, New York: McGraw-Hill.
- La Pirogue. Thibodaux, La.: Nicholls State University. 1957.
- La Pirogue. Thibodaux, La.: Nicholls State University. 1986.
- "Mathes Brierre - History". Mathes Brierre Architects. Archived from the original on September 30, 2016.
- National Register of Historic Places, Asset Details: Francis T. Nicholls Junior College Main Building, National Park Service. Accessed on 12 October 2016.
