= National Wetlands Research Center =

US research center

The National Wetlands Research Center (NWRC) was founded in 1975 as part of the U.S. Fish and Wildlife Service's (USFWS) Office of Biological Services. Its headquarters are located in Lafayette, Louisiana.

The NWRC is one of 16 science centers of the Biological Resources Division of the U.S. Geological Survey. The mission of the National Wetlands Research Center is to develop and disseminate scientific information needed for understanding the ecology and values of U.S. wetlands and for managing and restoring wetland habitats and associated plant and animal communities. Its mission's primary goal is to bridge the gap between researchers and decision makers, mostly by using geographic information systems and producing reports such as coastal characterizations, community and estuarine profiles, and species profiles.

== History ==
- 1975 - Began as the National Coastal Ecosystems Team; headquartered at National Aeronautic and Space Administration's rocket-testing site in Stennis, Mississippi.
- 1979 - Moved its headquarters to Slidell, Louisiana.
- 1986 - Gained a new research mission and renamed to the National Wetlands Research Center; opened field stations in Baton Rouge, Louisiana, Corpus Christi, Texas, and Vicksburg, Mississippi.
- 1992 - Moved its headquarters to the University of Louisiana at Lafayette research park in Lafayette, Louisiana, through the recruitment of president Ray Authement.
- 1993 - Secretary Bruce Babbitt consolidated research in several bureaus of the Department of the Interior to form the National Biological Survey, an agency designed to foster scientific understanding and technologies.
- 1994 - The National Wetlands Research Center added a field station in College Station, Texas, and project offices in Gulf Breeze, Florida, Baton Rouge, Louisiana, and Nacogdoches, Texas.
- 1995 - The National Biological Survey became the National Biological Service.
- 1996 - The National Biological Service became the Biological Resources Division of the U. S. Geological Survey.

== Sources ==
- NWRC history
- NWRC mission
