= Louisiana Center for Women in Government and Business Hall of Fame =

Recognizes women of Louisiana for achievements

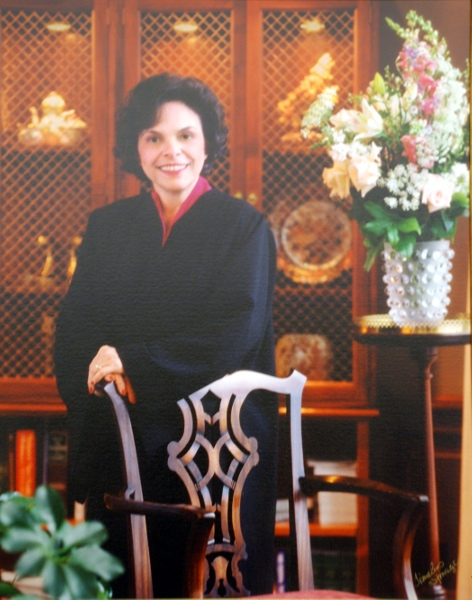
District Judge Mary Ann Vial Lemmon

The Louisiana Center for Women in Government and Business Hall of Fame recognizes women natives or residents of the U.S. state of Louisiana for their significant achievements or statewide contributions. Among the inductees are men whose contributions to supporting strong women were deemed significant. The Center is headquartered at Nicholls State University in Thibodaux and was established in 1991 to promote and encourage government and public service leadership of women. The first Hall of Fame inductions occurred in March 1994 during Women's History Month.

== Inductees ==
Louisiana Center for Women in Government and Business Hall of Fame
Name	Image	Birth–Death	Year	Area of achievement	Ref(s)
Gayle Benson		(b. 1947)	2023	Lifetime Achievement Award; Owner New Orleans Saints and New Orleans Pelicans	
Andrea Renee Brinkley		(b. 1966)	2023	Major, Civil Department, Lafourche Parish Sheriff's Office	
Jay Clune		(b. 1964)	2023	Men Supporting Strong Women, President of Nicholls State University	
Jay Dardenne		(b. 1954)	2023	Men Supporting Strong Women, Louisiana Commissioner of Administration	
Donna Edwards		(b. 1967)	2023	Lifetime Achievement Award, First Lady of Louisiana, wife of Governor John Bel Edwards	
Laurie Guimont		(b. 1955)	2023	Career coach, Pepper Leaf	
Sharon Lavigne		(b. 1950)	2023	Environmental justice activist	
Julie Stokes		(b. 1970)	2023	Former member of the Louisiana House of Representatives, CEO of Flame Consulting	
Lloyd "Chip" Badeaux		(1947–2023)	2017	Men who Support women	
Marguerite Knight		(b. 1957)	2017	Senior Vice President Morgan Stanley	
Mary Landrieu		(b. 1955)	2017	United States Senator	
Yvonne LaFleur		(b. 1947)	2017	Entrepreneur	
Genny May		(b. 1948)	2017	United States Marshal	
Elaine Musso		(b. 1944)	2017	Leadership Council activist	
Eva Shanklin		(b. 1939)	2017	Louisiana State WIN Coordinator for NAACP, President Emeritus, Lafourche Chapter	
Kim Sport		(b. 1942)	2017	Former Executive Counsel to Chief Justice	
Luci Sposito		(b. 1966)	2017	Lafourche Parish Council Vice Chair	
Karen St. Germain		(b. 1957)	2017	Louisiana House of Representatives	
Raja Talluri		(b. 1965)	2017	Physician (Men Who Support Women)	
Stephanie Burks		(b. 1970)	2015	Entrepreneurship, co-owner and co-founder of RYCARS Construction, LLC	
Leah Chase		(1923–2019)	2015	Lifetime Achievement Award, Owner of Dooky Chase's restaurant in New Orleans	
Jackie Clarkson		(1936–2024)	2015	Award for Public Service, New Orleans City Council	
Felicia Frederick		(b. 1963)	2015	Manager of State Governmental Affairs for Chevron, Government, Policy, and Public Affairs	
Russ Herman		(b. 1942)	2015	Men Who Support Strong Women; Senior Partner, Herman, Herman & Katz Law Firm; philanthropic support of and work for The Center	
Christian LeBlanc		(b. 1958)	2015	Men Who Support Strong Women, support of numerous charities including The Center, Bayou Junior Woman's Club and The Lafourche Commission on Women	
Leslie Marsh		(1961–2019)	2015	Outstanding Activists for The Center for Women, Advisory Board for The Center and The Son of a Saint. Donor Relations Officer, Tulane University	
Nell Nolan			2015	Journalist for The Advocate, Blue Ribbon Award for Media	
Karen Puckett		(b. 1960)	2015	President of Global Markets for CenturyLink	
Brandie Toups		(b. 1973)	2015	Outstanding Activists for The Center for Women, Louisiana Girls Leadership Academy	
Vanessa Guidry-Whipple		(b. 1955)	2015	Chief Judge, Louisiana's First Circuit Court of Appeal	
Donnell Zeringue		(b. 1953)	2015	Outstanding Activists for The Center for Women, chair of the Public Service Project for The Center's Louisiana Girls Leadership Academy. Lafourche Commission on Women, National Leaders Summit and The Louisiana Leaders Conference	
Maurice Durbin		(b. 1943)	2013	Lobbyist for women's rights in Louisiana	
Kay Katz		(b. 1938)	2013	Republican former member of the Louisiana House of Representatives and former Louisiana Republican National Committeewoman	
Demetric Mercadel		(b. 1959)	2013	Senior Associate Analyst for Entergy New Orleans, Inc.	
Willie Mount		(b. 1949)	2013	Member of the Louisiana State Senate from 2000 to 2012	
Lena Torres		(1921–2021)	2013	Clerk of Court for St. Bernard Parish	
Elizabeth Ratcliff Dent		(b. 1940)	2012	President of Financial and Management Services	
Kathleen Mix Diamond		(b. 1951)	2012	Vice Chancellor for Workforce Development and Education at Delgado Community College	
Andie Bollinger Giardina		(1951–2019)	2012	Longtime supporter of Women's Night Out, a major fundraiser for women student-athletes	
Rose Hudson		(b. 1964)	2012	Chief Executive Officer, Louisiana Lottery	
Alice Pecoraro		(b. 1946)	2011	Council for a Better Louisiana, Louisiana State Board of Commerce and Industry and the Louisiana Endowment of Humanities.	
Adele Ransom		(1927–2019)	2011	First woman to have been elected to the Ouachita Police Jury. She is a member of the Ouachita Correctional Center Advisory Board and the Ouachita Board of Commissioners	
Jean Rice		(1939–2024)	2011	The Louisiana Center for Women and Government	
Suzanne Terrell		(b. 1954)	2011	Former Louisiana Elections Commissioner, Senior advisor and director of outreach for the Economic Development Administration in the United States Department of Commerce under President George W. Bush; lost 2002 Senate election to Mary Landrieu.	
Jean Armstrong		(b. 1944)	2010	Co-founder of the Louisiana Voting Rights Network and president of League of Women Voters.	
Betty Scott Cummins		(b. 1939)	2010	Director for both Winnsboro State Bank and the Scott Companies	
Faith Peperone		(b. 1946)	2010	Founder Metropolitan Republican Women's Club	
Leslie Robichaux Suazo		(b. 1957)	2010	Director of Coastal Restoration and Preservation for Terrebonne Parish and community relations coordinator for the Barataria-Terrebonne National Estuary Program.	
Rosemary Ewing		(b. 1944)	2009	First female board chairman of Louisiana United Methodist Children and Family Services, Inc.	
Phyllis Mayo		(b. 1949)	2009	First woman elected to the Alexandria City Council; executive committees of the Louisiana Democratic Party. Special assistant to the governor on women's policy, organizing the first Gathering of Louisiana Women Leaders	
Anne Milling		(b. 1941)	2009	Past president of the Junior League of New Orleans Inc. and past chair of the Loyola University Board of Trustees.	
LilyB Moskal		(1929–2020)	2009	(*Note: the spelling of LilyB is not a typo), Founder of Success Seminars, motivational workshops	
Kitty DeGree		(1922–2012)	2008	Philanthropist who made her money in real estate, Kitty DeGree Breast Health Center at St. Francis Medical Center and Kitty Degree School of Nursing at the University of Louisiana at Monroe	
Sandy Rosenthal		(b. 1957)	2008	Civic organizer who founded Levees.org/ in the aftermath of Hurricane Katrina	
Dolores Spikes		(1936–2015)	2008	President Southern University and A&M College, president University of Maryland Eastern Shore	
Phyllis Taylor		(b. 1938)	2008	Philanthropist, chairman and chief executive officer Taylor Energy	
Irma Muse Dixon		(b. 1952)	2007	First African-American elected to the Louisiana Public Service Commission (PSC)	
Mary Ann Lemmon		(b. 1941)	2007	United States federal judge appointed by Bill Clinton July 25, 1966; Judge, Louisiana District Court, Twenty-ninth Judicial District, 1982–1996; Judge pro tempore, Court of Appeal, First Circuit, Louisiana, 1990	
Melinda Schwegmann		(b. 1946)	2007	First woman Lieutenant Governor of Louisiana	
Pinkie Wilkerson		(1948–2000)	2007	Former Louisiana State Representative from District 11 (Claiborne and parts of Bienville, Lincoln, and Union parishes)	
Mari Ann Fowler		(b. 1937)	2006	Deceased second wife of Jerry Fowler, abducted from a parking lot in Port Allen, Louisiana on Christmas Eve 2002 while Jerry Fowler was incarcerated for kickbacks and income tax evasion. State District Judge Janice Clark declared her legally dead, May 2004.	
Bunnatine H. Greenhouse		(b. 1944)	2006	Top procurement official at the U.S. Army Corps of Engineers, who blew the whistle on Halliburton contracts	
Ethel N. Knobloch		(1919–2016)	2006	Former City Councilwoman, Thibodaux	
Verna S. Landrieu		(b. 1955)	2006	Matriarch of Louisiana's Landrieu's family; mother of New Orleans Mayor Mitch Landrieu and United States Senator Mary Landrieu	
Marilyn B. Kilgen		(b. 1944)	2005	Professor of Biological Sciences	
Carol R. LeBlanc			2005	Member of the Judiciary Commission of Louisiana	
Martha A. Madden		(1937–2019)	2005	Consultant and president of Madden Associates, LLC, former Special Assistant at the U.S. Department of Energy and is the former Secretary of the Louisiana Department of Environmental Quality, served on two Homeland Security Task Forces at the Center for Strategic & International Studies	
Barbara Norton		(b. 1946)	2005	Member of the Louisiana House of Representatives	
Laura Badeaux			2004	Director, Louisiana Center for Women and Government at Nicholls State University	
Velma Callais-Rogers		(b. 1932)	2004		
Judy Ewell Day		(b. 1952)	2003	Lobbyist-consultant, Woman's Hospital/Woman's Health Foundation	
Roberta Madden		(b. 1936)	2003	Writer, book editor, first director of the Baton Rouge Consumer Protection Center. Co-founder of the Baton Rouge chapter of the National Organization for Women. Served on the U.S. Commission on Civil Rights Louisiana State Advisory Committee. Baton Rouge Council of Human Relations, Association of American University Women, Louisiana Women's Political Caucus, Women's Equality Alliance League, Baton Rouge Mayor-President's Commission on the Needs of Women.	
Darlene L. Pellegrin		(b. 1956)	2003		
Margaret Gamble Pereboom		(1928–2008)	2003	Psychologist, chair Louisiana Women in Politics, Louisiana Health Care Campaign	
Jo Ann Cefalu Blanchard		(b. 1943)	2002	Member Historic District Commission, Morgan City	
Alice Foster		(1940–2025)	2002	Former First Lady of Louisiana, wife of former Governor Murphy J. Foster, Jr., resided at Oaklawn Manor; served on the Executive Board of the Sunshine Foundation in Baton Rouge, which builds self-esteem among Kindergarten children	
Sibal Suarez Holt		(b. 1946)	2002	S. Holt Construction, former president of the Louisiana AFL-CIO.	
Norma Jane Sabiston		(1955–2020)	2002	Political consultant	
Lois D. Breaux		(b. 1943)	2001		
Joanne Ferriot		(b. 1940)	2001	Member of Louisiana Board of Ethics, retired administrator of Nicholls State University	
Margaret D. Montgomery-Richard		(b. 1956)	2001	Co-owner DMM & Associates	
Cecile B. Tauzin		(b. 1966)	2001	Board of Trustees, Ford Theatre, Washington D.C.	
Eleanora Angelo		(1933–2022)	2000		
Eileen R. Armstrong		(1917–2010)	2000	First female school board president in East Baton Rouge Parish, active in many organizations, including the Democratic Party	
Constance A. Koury		(b. 1953)	2000	Lawyer, first female executive council to the Governor of Louisiana; first female Assistant Attorney General in Louisiana. General council, Louisiana Board of Regents. Executive Director, Louisiana Association for Justice	
Barbara Mansfield		(1927–2016)	2000	Former president National Federation of Democratic Women	
Beth Rickey		(1956–2009)	2000	Republican political activist from Louisiana who exposed the neo-Nazi connections of former State Representative David Duke, who ran for the U.S. Senate and for governor of Louisiana	
Marilyn Thayer		(b. circa 1929)	2000	Republican Party activist, president of the National Federation of Republican Women, 1996-1997; state co-chair, Reagan-Bush Committee	
Wilhelmina Bernard Armour		(1927–2023)	1999		
Charlotte A. Bollinger		(b. 1947)	1999	Executive Vice President, Bollinger Shipyards, Inc.; member of numerous civic organizations; member of the Board of Regents for the State of Louisiana	
Beth Courtney		(b. 1945)	1999	President and CEO of Louisiana Public Broadcasting	
Sybil Haydel Morial		(1932–2024)	1999	Retired Blue Cross-Blue Shield of Louisiana Board of Directors; founder of the Louisiana League of Good Government, active in women's rights and civil rights	
Mary Ellen Wisham		(1916–2012)	1999	Undersecretary of Management and Finance for the Louisiana Department of Labor	
Betsy Cheramie Ayo		(1936–1997)	1998	Namesake of Betsy Cheramie Ayo Hal at Nicholls University; active in civic organizations, wife of Nicholls State University president Donald Ayo	
Sally Clausen		(b. 1945)	1998	Former Louisiana Commissioner of Higher Education; also served as Adjunct Professor for Louisiana State University, Deputy Commissioner of Administration, Commissioner of Higher Education, Secretary of Education for the Office of the Governor, and President of Southeastern Louisiana University.	
Linda Talbert			1998	Nurse	
Iris Kelso		(1926–2003)	1997	Journalist in New Orleans	
Myrtle Pickering		deceased	1997		
Doris B. Reggie		(b. 1930)	1997	Civic-engaged wife of Edmund Reggie; second mother-in-law of Edward M. Kennedy, Democrat activist	
Marie Louise Wilcox Snellings		(1912–1994)	1997	Tulane University Board of Administrators; mother-in-law of U.S. Senator Mary Landrieu	
Gayle F. Truly		(b. 1942)	1997	Member of the Louisiana Violent Crime and Homicide Task Force	
C. Maxine Holtry Daniels		(1919–2018)	1996	Martin Luther King Executive Committee, Southern Christian Leadership Conference	
Betty Green Heitman		(1930–1994)	1996	Co-chairwoman of the Republican National Committee, 1983-1987; former president of the National Federation of Republican Women	
Kathy M. Vick		(1939–2011)	1996	Democratic Party worker who called roll-call votes at national conventions	
Lillian W. Walker		(1923–2016)	1996	Former Louisiana State Representative from East Baton Rouge Parish 1968–1972	
Dorothy H. Wallace		(1927–2011)	1996		
Lucille May Grace		(1900–1957)	1995	Louisiana Register of the State Land Office, 1932, first woman to attain statewide elected office in Louisiana	
Maggie Bell Atkins Hodges		(1922–1986)	1995	Republican Party activist during Eisenhower administration	
Eddie D. Brown Jones		(1905–2003)	1995		
Ellen Bryan Moore		(1912–1999)	1995	Louisiana Register of State Lands	
Ollie Tucker Osborne		(1911–1994)	1995	Real estate business woman, 1973 Louisiana League of Women Voters' official observer of the state constitutional convention, women's rights activist	
Lindy Boggs		(1916–2013)	1994	United States House of Representatives; United States Ambassador to the Holy See	
Fran Bussie		(b. 1935)	1994	Democratic Party activist; Board of Directors Arthritis Association of Louisiana; second wife and widow of AFL-CIO state president Victor Bussie	
Pat Evans		(1931–2013)	1994	Director of the International Project for Nonprofit Leadership (IPNL) at the University of New Orleans	
Virginia "Ginny" Martinez		(1922–1992)	1994	Louisiana Republican Party National Committeewoman; Louisiana Federation of Republican Women created the Ginny Martinez Scholarship in her honor.	
Corinne D. Maybuce		deceased	1994	Regional Director Delta Sigma Theta 1955–58, 1970–72	
Mary Evelyn Parker		(1920–2015)	1994	First woman to have held the position Louisiana State Treasurer	
Doris Lindsey Holland Rhodes		(1909–1997)	1994	First woman to serve in Louisiana legislature; first as state senator and then as state representative from St. Helena Parish	
Rupert F. Richardson		(1930–2008)	1994	Former national president of NAACP	
Virginia Shehee		(1923–2015)	1994	Louisiana State Senator for District 38 (Caddo and De Soto parishes), 1976-1980	

== See also ==
- Louisiana Political Museum and Hall of Fame
- Old Louisiana State Capitol
