= J. Louis Watkins Jr. =

American judge (1929–1997)

Joseph Louis Watkins Jr.

Judge of the Louisiana First Circuit Court of Appeal
- Succeeded by: John Michael Guidry
- In office 1979 – August 29, 1997

Personal details
- Born: March 26, 1929
- Died: August 29, 1997 (aged 68) Houma, Terrebonne Parish, Louisiana, USA
- Cause of death: Cancer
- Party: Democratic
- Spouse: Shirley Theresa Watkins (married 1951–1997, his death)
- Children: Including: Joseph Louis Watkins III
- Occupation: Judge; Attorney

Joseph Louis Watkins Jr. (March 26, 1929 – August 29, 1997), was a judge of the Louisiana First Circuit Court of Appeal, based in Baton Rouge, Louisiana, from 1979 until his death in 1997. He resided in Houma in Terrebonne Parish in south Louisiana.

== Career ==
=== 1972 congressional race ===
In 1972, Watkins, then a practicing attorney, was the unsuccessful Democratic nominee for Louisiana's 3rd congressional district seat vacated after two terms by Patrick T. Caffery. Watkins won his party's nomination in a runoff election with State Senator Carl W. Bauer, then of Franklin in St. Mary Parish. Bauer had led Watkins by 262 votes in an eight-candidate field in the first primary, but their fortunes were reversed in the second round of balloting on September 30.

Watkins was defeated in the general election held on November 7 by Republican David C. Treen, then of Jefferson Parish. In a hard-fought campaign, the fourth that Treen had waged for a congressional seat over a decade, Treen prevailed with 71,090 votes (54 percent) to Watkins' 60,521 (46 percent). Treen polled narrow margins in the swing parishes of Iberia and St. Charles. Watkins won handily in St. Martin and Lafourche parishes and took 50.1 percent in Bauer's St. Mary Parish. While Watkins received 72.8 percent in his own parish of Terrebonne, Treen received practically the same margin in his home parish of Jefferson.

Treen had lost races for the then Second District House seat in 1962, 1964, and 1968, all against the Democratic party leader Hale Boggs. In 1972, the reconfigured Third District contained the conservative stronghold of Metairie, which had been removed from the Second District. The Third District overall, however, was still less conservative and much more rural than the former Second District. Treen became the first member of his party elected to a U.S. House seat from Louisiana in the 20th century; seven years later, he became the first Republican elected as governor of Louisiana. In 2013, Republicans held all but one of the six House seats from Louisiana; the Second District is now the only Democratic seat in the delegation.

Treen and a Republican "search committee" had offered to support Bauer for the House seat in 1972 if the Democrat would switch parties, but Bauer remained Democrat and instead expected to face Treen in the general election. Bauer's father, Ralph Norman Bauer, and Cecil Morgan of Shreveport had in 1929 as freshman state representatives led the impeachment for abuses of power against Governor Huey Pierce Long Jr.

=== Later years ===
After his defeat in the congressional campaign, Watkins became a member and served as the president of the Louisiana Board of Elementary and Secondary Education. He was elected circuit judge in 1978 and remained in the post for nearly two decades; his service ended with his death of cancer in Houma at the age of sixty-eight.

Watkins' father, J. Louis Watkins Sr. (1899–1978), was a judge in Terrebonne and Lafourche parishes. Watkins and his wife, Shirley Theresa Watkins (1928–2013), had a son, J. Louis Watkins III, who practices criminal, domestic, and personal-injury cases in Houma. The younger Watkins, known as "Bubba", was an unsuccessful Republican candidate for Terrebonne Parish clerk of court in the primary held on October 22, 2011. He polled nearly a third of the vote against fellow Republican Theresa A. Robichaux.

Legal offices
Preceded by Missing	Louisiana First Circuit Court of Appeal; 1979–1997	Succeeded by John Michael Guidry
