= Vandebilt Catholic High School =

Location
- 209 South Hollywood Road; Houma, (Terrebonne Parish), Louisiana 70360 USA; 29°36′13″N 90°44′55″W

Information
- Former names: Our Lady of the Sacred Heart Academy (1870-79); St. Francis de Sales High School (1879-1965); Houma Central Catholic High School (1965-1966)
- School type: Private, Catholic, Coeducational
- Religious affiliations: Roman Catholic, (Institute of the Brothers of the Sacred Heart located in Terrebonne Parish, Louisiana
- Established: 1870; 156 years ago
- Founder: Marianite Sisters of Holy Cross
- President: Jeremy Gueldner
- Principal: Elise LeBoeuf
- Faculty: 70
- Grades: 8–12
- Enrollment: 940
  - Grade 8: 211
  - Grade 9: 196
  - Grade 10: 181
  - Grade 11: 161
  - Grade 12: 164
- Average class size: 25
- Colors: Royal blue and gold
- Mascot: Terrier
- Team name: Terriers
- Rival: E.D. White Cardinals; Terrebonne Tigers; South Terrebonne Gators
- Accreditation: Southern Association of Colleges and Schools
- Athletic Director: Lance Ledet
- Assistant Athletic Director: Kayla Vicknair
- Website: vandebiltcatholic.org

Vandebilt Catholic High School is a private diocesan co-educational institution for grades 8-12 located in Terrebonne Parish, Louisiana and in the Roman Catholic Diocese of Houma-Thibodaux. It is located in the unincorporated area of Bayou Cane, near Houma.

== History ==
Vandebilt was founded by the Marianites of Holy Cross in 1870 as Our Lady of the Sacred Heart Academy (then as St. Francis de Sales Catholic High School from 1879 until 1965, and later Houma Central Catholic High School until 1966) and continued by the Brothers of the Sacred Heart.

The school primarily serves Catholic students of Terrebonne Parish. A college preparatory curriculum is offered as the school stresses a religious approach to the education of the whole student through academic, athletic, and co-curricular programs.

Vandebilt Catholic was named after Father August Vandebilt (November 10, 1866 - April 7, 1938), who was born in the Netherlands. He was ordained into the priesthood at the American College of Louvain on June 29, 1890. Father Vandebilt died in his position as pastor of the Church of St. Francis de Sales in Houma, Louisiana.

On March 27, 1966, Houma Central Catholic High School was named in honor of Father Vandebilt on the occasion of his birth centenary.

== Mascot ==
The mascot of Vandebilt Catholic High School is the Boston Terrier (by appearance), though known as the "Fightin' Terriers."

== Athletics ==
Vandebilt Catholic athletics competes in the LHSAA.

=== Championships ===
Football Championships

- (1) State Championship: 1959

Baseball Championships

- (12) State Championships: 1953, 1954, 1955, 1956, 1957, 1959, 1961, 1962, 1963, 1965, 1971, 2022

Boys Soccer Championships

- (9) State Championships: 1998, 2002, 2003, 2006, 2007, 2008, 2010, 12015, 2018

Girls' Basketball Championships

- (2) State Championships: 2010, 2025

Softball Championships

- (16) State Championships: 1980, 1981, 1982, 1983, 1984, 1985, 1988, 1990, 1993, 1996, 1999, 2006, 2008, 2010, 2024, 2025

Volleyball Championships

- (1) State Championship: 2017

Girls' Tennis Championships

- (5) State Championships: 1996, 2008, 2009, 2010, 2011

Boys' Tennis Championships

- (8) State Championships: 1998, 2008, 2009, 2010, 2011, 2014, 2015, 2016

Boys' Cross Country State Champion

- (1) State Champion: 2022

Girls' Cross Country State Championships

- (5) State Championships: 2018, 2019, 2020, 2021, 2022

== Noted alumni ==
- Tab Benoit (Class of 1985)- recording artist
- Chuck Bush (Class of 1979) - actor, Fandango
- Marty J. Chabert - state senator for Terrebonne and Lafourche parishes, 1992–1996
- Karl Morgan (Class of 1979) - American football player, Tampa Bay Buccaneers, Houston Oilers, Saskatchewan Roughriders; coach, Alcorn State University (defensive co-ordinator), University of North Alabama (defensive co-ordinator)
- Theresa Plaisance (Class of 2010) - professional basketball player
- Elijah McGuire (Class of 2013), NFL running back for the Kansas City Chiefs
