= Norby Chabert =

American politician

Member of the Louisiana Senate from the 20th district
- In office September 2009 – January 2020
- Preceded by: Reggie Dupre
- Succeeded by: Mike Fesi

Personal details
- Born: Norbert Nolty Chabert; November 28, 1975 (age 50) Petit Caillou, Louisiana, U.S.
- Party: Democratic (Before 2011); Republican (2011–present)
- Relations: Leonard Chabert (Father); Marty Chabert (Brother)
- Education: Nicholls State University (BA)

Norbert Nolty Chabert, known as Norby Chabert (born November 28, 1975), is a former member of the Louisiana State Senate. Initially elected as a Democrat, Chabert became a Republican in 2011, criticizing the response of Barack Obama to the Deepwater Horizon oil spill.

Louisiana State Senate
Preceded by Reggie Dupre	Member of the Louisiana Senate from the 20th district 2009–2020	Succeeded by Mike Fesi
