= St. John High School (Plaquemine, Louisiana) =

Saint John The Evangelist High School
- Saint John
- Sanctus John Evangelist Altus Schola

Location
- 24250 Regina Street; Plaquemine, (Iberville Parish), Louisiana 70764; United States; 30°16′34″N 91°14′26″W

Information
- Type: Private, Coeducational
- Motto: In Cruce Salus (In the Cross there is Salvation)
- Religious affiliation: Roman Catholic
- Patron saint: Saint John The Evangelist
- Established: 1853; 173 years ago
- Founder: Father Charles Chambost
- Principal: Cherie Schlatre
- Chaplain: Father Greg Daigle
- Grades: PK–12
- Gender: Coed
- Age range: 4-18
- Language: English
- Hours in school day: 7
- Colors: Navy Blue and Old Gold
- Slogan: Educating Tomorrow's Leaders............Today
- Team name: Eagles
- Accreditation: Southern Association of Colleges and Schools
- Tuition: $4,454.00
- Website: www.stjohnschool.org

St. John The Evangelist High School is a private, Roman Catholic high school in Plaquemine, Louisiana. It is located in the Roman Catholic Diocese of Baton Rouge.

== History ==
In 1853, Catholic education was established in Plaquemine under the leadership of Father Charles Chambost, Pastor of St. John Church. He founded the College of the Immaculate Conception and a separate boys' school. This college was incorporated and authorized to grant BA and BS degrees by the State of Louisiana. In 1857, Father Chambost engaged the services of the Marianite Sisters of the Holy Cross, who came to Plaquemine to set up a school for girls, St. Basil's Academy. In 1858, the college, the boys' school, and St. Johns' Church was destroyed by fire. Father Chambost was financially unable to rebuild; heartbroken, he returned to France. During the Civil War, St. Basil's Academy was closed and was occupied by Union soldiers. For safety, the Sisters were recalled to the Motherhouse in New Orleans where they remained for three years. After the Civil War, Catholic education suffered. In 1866, Father Victor C'Hemecourt opened a school for boys. However, the school closed in 1871 due to a shortage of funds. It did not reopen until 1886. Father M. Harnais constructed a new school building adjacent to the church in 1888. This building burned in 1907, and the first two stories of the present brick structure were rebuilt to replace it in 1910.

Attendance at St. Basil's and St. John School for Boys grew rapidly in the 1900s. Under the direction of Monsignor Leonard Robin, education flourished. In 1933, St. John Free School for Boys and St. Basil's Academy merged to form the present day St. John School. Monsignor Robin bought the property where the schools are located today. He showed great interest in this new educational center. The gymnasium was built and used for classrooms while the high school was being built. The high school, under the direction of the Marianite Sisters, was dedicated in 1960. The elementary school was opened in the fall of 1967.

St. John has survived fires, yellow fever, epidemics, wars, the Depression, and other financial hardships. The school today is a symbol of dedication, faith, and endurance. The dreams of many men and women make St. John School what it is today-a symbol of rich history and tradition-which is kept alive today through the alumni, faculty, staff and student body.

On March 9, 1951, Monsignor Leonard Robin purchased 18 acres (73,000 m^{2}), the current site of St. John School, for $25,000. Joseph H. Marix was contracted to construct the gymnasium, the first building on the new campus. The ground breaking ceremonies were held in August 1953. The gym, which cost $159,378, was completed in time for the 1954-55 basketball season.

A new gym would be cost prohibitive; therefore, St. John School is moving forward with plans to renovate the existing gym. The renovated gym will be named the Monsignor Leonard Robin Gymnasium

== Athletics ==
St. John High athletics competes in the LHSAA.
