= Nicholls State University =

Public university in Thibodaux, Louisiana, US

- Former names: Francis T. Nicholls Junior College (1948–1956); Francis T. Nicholls State College (1956–1970)
- Motto: People Creating Possibilities
- Type: Public university
- Established: September 23, 1948
- Parent institution: UL System
- Academic affiliations: Space-grant
- Endowment: $30 million
- President: Jay Clune
- Students: 6,366
- Undergraduates: 5,717
- Postgraduates: 649
- Location: Thibodaux, Louisiana, U.S. 29.7903°N 90.8027°W
- Colors: Red & gray
- Nickname: Colonels
- Sporting affiliations: NCAA Division I FCS – Southland
- Website: nicholls.edu
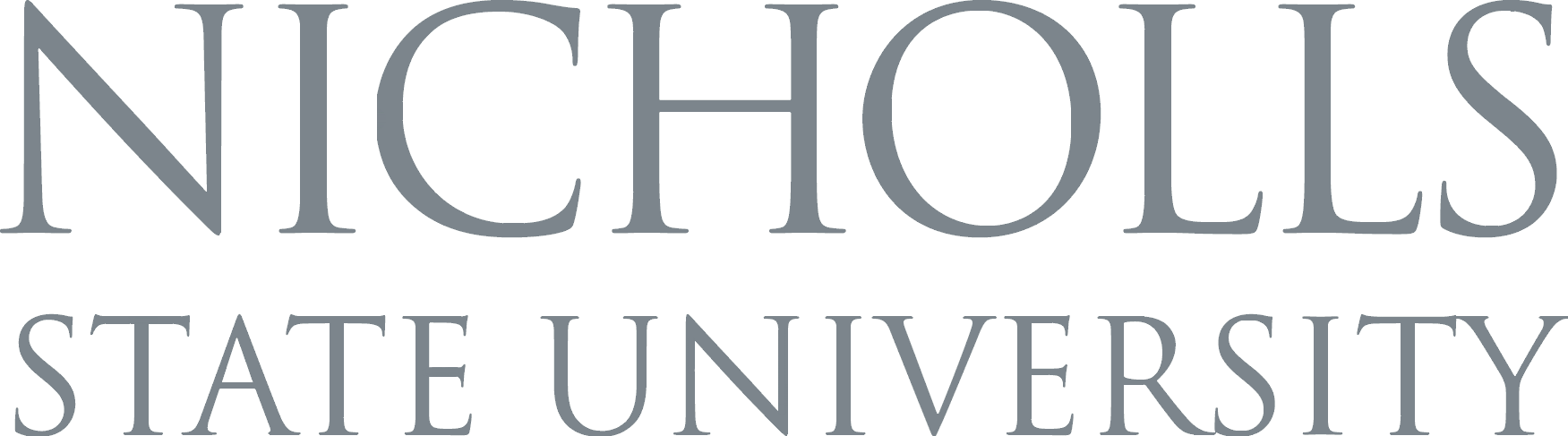

Nicholls State University is a public university in Thibodaux, Louisiana. Founded in 1948, Nicholls is part of the University of Louisiana System. Originally named Francis T. Nicholls Junior College, the university is named for Francis T. Nicholls, a former governor of Louisiana, member of the Louisiana Supreme Court, and general in the Confederate army during the American Civil War.

The 287-acre (1.16 km^{2}) campus, once part of Acadia Plantation, fronts on Bayou Lafourche, about 50 miles (80 km) southwest of New Orleans and 60 miles (97 km) southeast of Baton Rouge. Its oldest structure, Elkins Hall, was completed in 1948 and is on the National Register of Historic Places.

Nicholls is located in the Acadiana region. It is also within the geographical bounds of the Mississippi River Delta, and close to the Mississippi River, its distributaries, Louisiana's wetlands, and the Gulf of Mexico.

== History ==
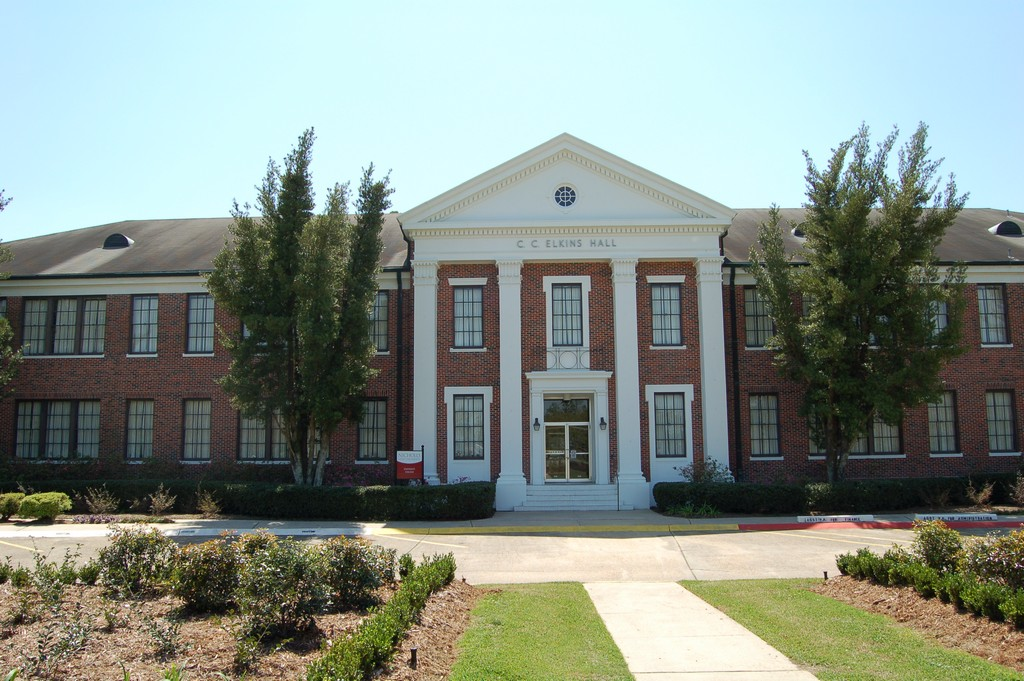

Nicholls State opened on Sept. 23, 1948, as Francis T. Nicholls Junior College of Louisiana State University. In 1956, the Louisiana Legislature separated Nicholls State from LSU and authorized it to develop four-year curricula. In September 1956, the former junior college became Francis T. Nicholls State College and granted its first degrees in May 1958. In 1970, Act 93 of the State Legislature changed the name of the institution to Nicholls State University.

University leadership

- Charles C. Elkins (1948–1962)
- Vernon F. Galliano (1963–1982)
- Donald J. Ayo (1983–2003)
- Stephen T. Hulbert (2003–2013)
- Dr. Bruce Murphy (2014–2017)
- Dr. Jay Clune (2018–present)

== Academics ==
Undergraduate demographics as of Fall 2023
Race and ethnicity	Total
White	65%
Black	18%
Hispanic	6%
Two or more races	3%
American Indian/Alaska Native	2%
Asian	2%
International student	2%
Unknown	2%
Economic diversity
Low-income (Note: The percentage of students who received an income-based federal Pell grant intended for low-income students.)	38%
Affluent (Note: The percentage of students who are a part of the American middle class at the bare minimum.)	62%

Academic rankings

Master's
- Washington Monthly: 203

Regional
- U.S. News & World Report: 102 (South)

Princeton Review statistics from 2010 list the student-to-faculty ratio at Nicholls as 20:1. Admission has become selective. The average GPA upon entry is 3.2 with an ACT score of 21. The average GPA of undergraduate students admitted to the university's honors program is 3.6 with an ACT score of 26. Almost 62 percent of the student body are women; and nearly 3 percent are international students. As with nearly all academic institutions in Louisiana, Hurricane Katrina affected Nicholls' completion rate and overall ranking. During the aftermath of Katrina, Nicholls suspended its admissions selectivity in order to accommodate students from hurricane affected institutions. The university also had many matriculating students who were affected by the hurricane and did not return.

=== Colleges ===
- College of Sciences and Technology
- College of Business Administration
- College of Education and Behavioral Sciences
- College of Nursing
- College of Liberal Arts
- University College
- University Graduate Studies

The Department of Art is built upon a broad liberal arts foundation and preparation in studio disciplines required for careers in the visual arts and design. The Department of Art is accredited by the National Association of Schools of Art and Design.

The Department of Mass Communication is one of five mass communication programs in Louisiana accredited by the Accrediting Council on Education in Journalism and Mass Communication (ACEJMC). The department offers two concentrations: journalism and public relations. Nicholls mass communication students and faculty employ three computer labs and a broadcast studio for learning and instruction in communication principles. Students within the department are also encouraged to apply for jobs with the KNSU radio station and student publications, helping to produce the yearbook or publishing the weekly newspaper, the Nicholls Worth.

The University of Louisiana System has identified the following areas as Unique Areas of Excellence at Nicholls State University. These are areas of study that, because of either their unique classes or their leadership in Louisiana education, have been selected for this special honor. These include the John Folse Culinary Institute, Biological Sciences (Marine and environmental sciences emphasis), Nursing, Allied Health Sciences, Teacher Education, Accounting and Information Systems, and Child, Family and Social Services. Other notable degree programs include: Bachelor of Arts in art, English, mass communication, and music; Bachelor of Science in applied sciences geomatics; and master's degrees in marine and environmental biology, education, and business administration (in addition to an Executive MBA program).

Nicholls is one of the first institutions in the United States to offer bachelor's degrees in Culinary Arts. Students gain expertise in both Cajun and French cuisine. The Chef John Folse Culinary Institute is the only American member of the prestigious Institut Paul Bocuse. Students also have the opportunity to earn a bachelor's degree in Culinary Arts and then work towards earning the MBA.

Nicholls' faculty have been recognized nationally and internationally by the Phi Kappa Phi honor society, the National Science Foundation, the National Institutes of Health, the National Endowment for the Humanities, Phi Kappa Lambda, the Renaissance Society of America, and other organizations and associations. In the past three years, several faculty members have been awarded grants from the Louisiana Board of Regents. The university has the only certified public health geneticist in the South. Nicholls is also the home of the Louisiana Center for Women and Government, as well as the Dyslexia Center of Louisiana.

Nicholls Online provides complete degrees online in a variety of disciplines. It offers over 100 online courses through its Division of Distance Education. Nicholls Online is different from regular online courses at Nicholls in that the courses are offered through 8-week sessions and have a unique fee structure.

== Ellender Memorial Library ==
The Allen J. Ellender Memorial Library offers research assistance to the Nicholls State University community via 125+ databases and traditional reference books. The Library provides access to over 61,000 e-books as part of a collection of more than 245,000 books. Librarians provide library research instruction classes in all disciplines as well as individual consultation sessions. A leisure book collection with recent popular writers and 50 popular magazine titles is also available. The Library has both single and group study rooms for patron use. There is also an interlibrary loan service which acquires materials from other libraries, and a courtesy card service that allows patrons to check out materials from other Louisiana universities.

Ellender Library, through its Government Information Department, has been a selective depository for Louisiana state government publications since 1960 and a selective depository of the U.S. Federal Depository Library Program since 1962. The Library is a congressionally designated depository for United States government documents. Public access to the government documents collection is guaranteed by public law (Title 44 USC). In its role as a depository, Government Information houses an extensive collection of books, periodicals, microfiche, maps, CDs, and kits published by Louisiana state and federal agencies on a wide array of topics such as health, geology, military history, law and legislation, education, statistics and more.

The Archives and Special Collections Department of Ellender Memorial Library is the archival repository for the historical records of the university and serves as a repository for primary and secondary material relating to the geographical, historical and cultural uniqueness of the region. The collections include personal papers, business and organizational records, historical photographs, literary manuscripts, maps, diaries and scrapbooks. Newspapers, oral histories, and numerous other formats are also represented. Many collections document the plantation era and the sugar cane industry. The Archives and Special Collections Department is also home to the library's Regional, Rare Book, and Genealogy Collections.

== Athletics ==
Nicholls sports teams participate in NCAA Division I (Football Championship Subdivision or FCS for football) in the Southland Conference. Nicholls' colors are red and gray and the athletics teams are nicknamed the Colonels. The Nicholls State University Department of Athletics currently sponsors men's intercollegiate baseball, basketball, cross-country, football, golf and tennis along with women's intercollegiate basketball, cross-country, softball, soccer, tennis, track and field (indoor and outdoor) and volleyball.

Nicholls' official athletics mascot is Colonel Tillou. The modern version wears a bright red uniform topped off with a contemporary-style military officer's cap.

The Pride of Nicholls is the marching band which represents the university. The band performs pregame and during halftime at all Nicholls Colonels home football games, selected away games and in exhibitions at selected marching festivals during the fall semester.

Nicholls' primary athletic rivals are Southeastern Louisiana University and Northwestern State University.

== Notable alumni ==
=== Politics and judiciary ===
- John L. Weimer, Chief Justice of the Louisiana Supreme Court
- Robert Billiot, member of the Louisiana House of Representatives for Jefferson Parish from 2008-2020
- Marty J. Chabert, state senator for Terrebonne and Lafourche parishes from 1992 to 1996
- Norby Chabert, state senator for Terrebonne and Lafourche parishes from 2009–2020
- Hunt Downer, former speaker of the Louisiana House of Representatives; assistant adjutant general of the Louisiana National Guard
- Anthony Guarisco Jr., lawyer and state senator from Morgan City from 1976 to 1988
- Joe Harrison, state representative since 2008 from Assumption, St. Mary and Terrebonne parishes
- Francis C. Heitmeier (born 1950), Democratic member of the Louisiana House from 1984 to 1992 and the Louisiana Senate from 1992 to 2008; businessman and lobbyist from New Orleans
- Morris Lottinger Jr., former state legislator and judge from Terrebonne Parish
- Jerome "Dee" Richard, former member of the Louisiana House of Representatives from Lafourche Parish, one of only two Independents in the chamber
- Billy Tauzin, member of the United States House of Representatives from 1980 to 2005
- Sid Edwards, 65th Mayor-President of Baton Rouge and East Baton Rouge Parish

=== Athletics ===
- Bobby April, National Football League (NFL) coach
- Gary Barbaro, NFL safety
- Gerald Butler, NFL wide receiver
- Anatoly Bose, international basketball guard and forward
- Bobby Felder, NFL cornerback
- Darryl Hamilton, Major League Baseball (MLB) outfielder
- Hilton Koch, former owner of the WNBA's Houston Comets
- Kareem Moore, NFL safety
- Darryl Pounds, former NFL defensive back
- Antonio Robinson, NFL wide receiver
- Dwight Walker, former NFL running back and wide receiver
- Lardarius Webb, NFL cornerback and return specialist

=== Other ===
- Donald J. Boudreaux, economist and professor
- Punkie Johnson, actress and stand-up comedian, featured player on Saturday Night Live from 2020 to 2024.
- Kellyn LaCour-Conant, restoration ecologist
- Cyril and Libbye Hellier, operatic sopranos
- Andrew Simoncelli, WWL-TV producer, professor
- Rocsi Diaz, talk show host of 106 & Park, Entertainment Tonight and ABC correspondent

== Notable faculty ==
- Monnie T. Cheves (1902–1988), education professor; served in the Louisiana House of Representatives from Natchitoches Parish from 1952 to 1960
- Thomas G. Clausen (1939–2002), the last elected Louisiana state superintendent of education, on Nicholls faculty from 1967 to 1972
- Marilyn Kilgen (1944), microbiologist and seafood safety scientist

== See also ==
- Elkins Hall
- Louisiana Center for Women and Government Hall of Fame
