= Chauvin, Louisiana =

Chauvin
- CDP
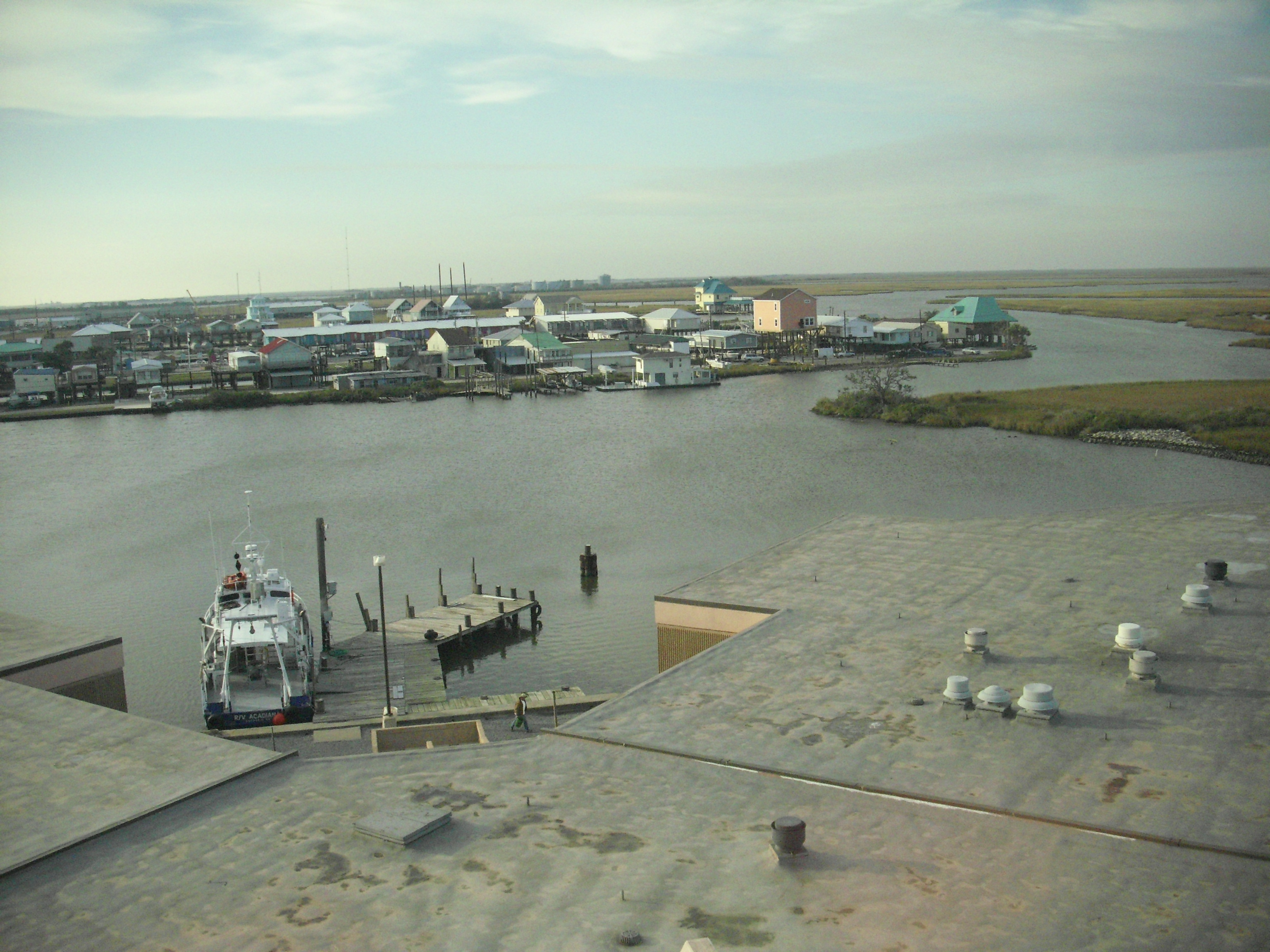

- Location of Chauvin in Louisiana
- Coordinates: 29°26′49″N 90°35′37″W
- Country: United States
- State: Louisiana
- Parish: Terrebonne

Area
  - Total: 4.77 sq mi (12.35 km^{2})
  - Land: 4.76 sq mi (12.33 km^{2})
  - Water: 0.0077 sq mi (0.02 km^{2})
- Elevation: 3 ft (0.91 m)

Population (2020)
  - Total: 2,575
  - Density: 540.8/sq mi (208.81/km^{2})
- Time zone: UTC-6 (CST)
  - Summer (DST): UTC-5 (CDT)
- ZIP code: 70344
- Area code: 985
- FIPS code: 22-14520

Chauvin is a census-designated place (CDP) in Terrebonne Parish, Louisiana, United States. The population was 2,575 in 2020.. It is part of the Houma–Bayou Cane–Thibodaux metropolitan statistical area.

== Geography ==
Chauvin is located at 29°26′49″N 90°35′37″W (29.447056, -90.593486). About 45 minutes southeast of Thibodaux Louisiana.

According to the United States Census Bureau, the CDP has a total area of 4.7 square miles (12 km^{2}), of which 4.7 square miles (12 km^{2}) is land and 0.21% is water.

West of the village is the Bayou Chauvin Oil and Gas Field.

== Demographics ==
Historical population
| Census | Pop. | Note | %± |
|---|---|---|---|
| 1980 | 3,338 | | — |
| 1990 | 3,375 | | 1.1% |
| 2000 | 3,229 | | −4.3% |
| 2010 | 2,912 | | −9.8% |
| 2020 | 2,575 | | −11.6% |
U.S. Decennial Census; 1950 1960 1970 1980; 1990 2000 2010

Chauvin first appeared as a census designated place the 1980 U.S. Census.

Chauvin racial composition as of 2020
| Race | Number | Percentage |
|---|---|---|
| White (non-Hispanic) | 2,248 | 87.3% |
| Black or African American (non-Hispanic) | 19 | 0.74% |
| Native American | 102 | 3.96% |
| Asian | 16 | 0.62% |
| Other/Mixed | 111 | 4.31% |
| Hispanic or Latino | 79 | 3.07% |

As of the 2020 United States census, there were 2,575 people, 862 households, and 688 families residing in the CDP.

== Education ==
The school district is Terrebonne Parish School District, as with other locations in the parish.

Terrebonne Parish Library operates the Chauvin Library.

== Notable people ==
- Ray Authement, the fifth president of the University of Louisiana at Lafayette from 1974 to 2008 and the longest serving president of a public university in the United States, was born near Chauvin in 1928.
- Leonard J. Chabert, member of both houses of the Louisiana State Legislature from Terrebonne and Lafourche parishes from 1972 to 1992, was born in Chauvin c. 1932.
- Melissa Martin, chef, owner of Mosquito Supper Club, and cookbook writer
