= Charles C. Barham =

American politician

Member of the Louisiana State Senate
- In office 1964–1972
- In office 1976–1988

Personal details
- Born: April 20, 1934 Ruston, Louisiana, U.S.
- Died: May 3, 2010 (aged 76)
- Party: Democratic
- Spouse: Jo Ann Frasier
- Children: 3
- Parent: C. E. Barham (father)
- Education: Louisiana Polytechnic Institute; Louisiana State University

Charles C. Barham (April 20, 1934 – May 3, 2010) was an American politician. He served as a Democratic member of the Louisiana State Senate.

== Life and career ==
Barham was born in Ruston, Louisiana. He attended Louisiana Polytechnic Institute and Louisiana State University.

Barham was an attorney.

Barham served in the Louisiana State Senate from 1964 to 1972 and again from 1976 to 1988.

Barham died on May 3, 2010, at the age of 76.

In 2013, Barham was posthumously inducted into the Louisiana Political Museum and Hall of Fame.
