= Houma, Louisiana =

- City
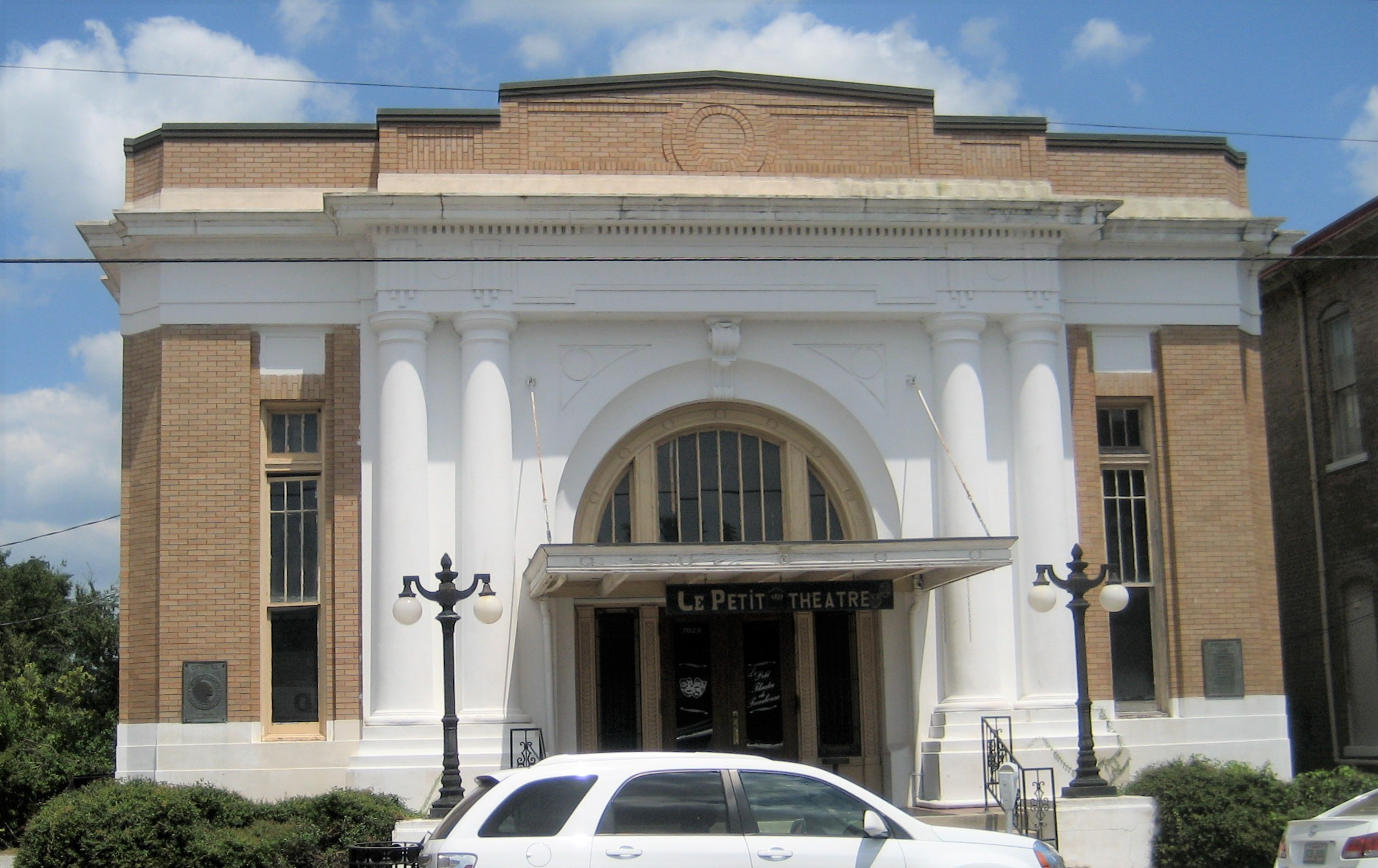
- Former City Hall, now Le Petit Theatre

- Location of Houma in Terrebonne Parish, Louisiana

- Location in Louisiana Location in the United States
- Coordinates: 29°35′15″N 90°42′58″W
- Country: United States
- State: Louisiana
- Parish: Terrebonne
- Founded: 1834; 192 years ago
- Incorporated: 1848; 178 years ago
- Reincorporated: 1898; 128 years ago
- Named for: Houma people
- Parish seat: Terrebonne
- Principal city: Houma–Bayou Cane–Thibodaux Metropolitan Statistical Area
- Region: Acadiana; South Louisiana

Government
  - Type: Government
  - Body: Consolidated City-Parish
  - Parish President: Jason W. Bergeron (since 2024)

Area
  - City: 14.59 sq mi (37.80 km^{2})
  - Land: 14.47 sq mi (37.47 km^{2})
  - Water: 0.13 sq mi (0.33 km^{2})

Population (2020)
  - City: 33,406
  - Density: 2,309.1/sq mi (891.55/km^{2})
  - Metro: 208,178
- Time zone: UTC−6 (CST)
  - Summer (DST): UTC−5 (CDT)
- ZIP code: 70360, 70363-64
- Area code: 985
- FIPS code: 22-36255
- Website: www.tpcg.org

Houma (/ˈhoʊmə/ HOH-mə) is the largest city in and the parish seat of Terrebonne Parish in the U.S. state of Louisiana. It is also the largest principal city of the Houma–Bayou Cane–Thibodaux metropolitan statistical area. The city's government was absorbed by the parish in 1984, which currently operates as the Terrebonne Parish Consolidated Government.

The population was 33,727 at the 2010 census, an increase of 1,334 over the 2000 census tabulation of 32,393. In 2020, the population estimates program determined 32,467 people lived in the city. At the 2020 census, its population rebounded to 33,406. Many unincorporated areas are adjacent to the city of Houma. The largest, Bayou Cane, is an urbanized area commonly referred to by locals as being part of Houma, but it is not included in the city's census counts, and is a separate census-designated place. If the populations of the urbanized census-designated places were included with that of the city of Houma, the total would exceed 60,000 residents.

== Etymology ==
The city was named after the historic Native American tribe of Houma people, believed to be related to the Choctaw. The United Houma Nation is recognized by the state of Louisiana, but it has not achieved federal recognition.

== History ==
Settled by the Chitimacha and then the Houma Indians prior to European colonization, Houma was soon named for the Houma Indians who were at Ouiski Point. Land claimed for the Houma Indians by the Spanish was not recognized by the United States after the Louisiana Purchase.

Present-day Houma was formed in 1832; the city was incorporated in 1848. The area was developed for sugar cane plantations in the antebellum years. Plantations were sited along the rivers and bayous in order to have access to water transportation.

=== Reconstruction to present ===
Sugar cane continued to be important after the war and into the 20th century.

On January 24, 1970, an accidental gas explosion killed three people and caused extensive damage downtown. Latour's Jewelry Store was destroyed.

In 1984, the city and parish consolidated their governments. In 2008, Bill Ellzey, a columnist at Houma Today, wrote that area residents were often unaware of the Houma city boundaries as the city and parish governments had consolidated.

In late August 2021, Houma was struck by the intense eye wall of category 4 Hurricane Ida, causing widespread damage. In August 2022, NBC News reported that in the year that followed, the area was still devastated by the impact of Ida, resulting in significant displacement and property damage.

== Geography ==
Houma is located at 29°35′15″N 90°42′58″W (29.587614, -90.716108) and has an elevation of 10 feet (3.0 m) above sea level. According to the United States Census Bureau, the city has a total area of 14.2 square miles (37 km^{2}), of which 14.0 square miles (36 km^{2}) is land and 0.2 square miles (0.52 km^{2}), or 0.92%, is water.

=== Climate ===
The climate in this area is characterized by hot, humid summers and generally mild, sometimes warm winters. According to the Köppen Climate Classification system, Houma has a humid subtropical climate, abbreviated Cfa on climate maps.

Climate data for Houma, Louisiana, 1991–2020 normals, extremes 1893–2013
Month	Jan	Feb	Mar	Apr	May	Jun	Jul	Aug	Sep	Oct	Nov	Dec	Year
Record high °F (°C)	88 (31)	87 (31)	90 (32)	92 (33)	99 (37)	104 (40)	102 (39)	101 (38)	100 (38)	97 (36)	91 (33)	89 (32)	104 (40)
Mean maximum °F (°C)	77.3 (25.2)	78.8 (26.0)	82.3 (27.9)	85.8 (29.9)	91.2 (32.9)	93.8 (34.3)	95.7 (35.4)	95.8 (35.4)	94.1 (34.5)	89.3 (31.8)	84.6 (29.2)	79.8 (26.6)	96.5 (35.8)
Mean daily maximum °F (°C)	63.9 (17.7)	67.2 (19.6)	72.9 (22.7)	78.3 (25.7)	85.2 (29.6)	89.9 (32.2)	91.3 (32.9)	91.4 (33.0)	88.6 (31.4)	81.5 (27.5)	72.3 (22.4)	66.4 (19.1)	79.1 (26.2)
Daily mean °F (°C)	53.7 (12.1)	57.5 (14.2)	63.6 (17.6)	68.9 (20.5)	76.2 (24.6)	81.2 (27.3)	82.7 (28.2)	82.9 (28.3)	79.7 (26.5)	71.2 (21.8)	61.9 (16.6)	56.0 (13.3)	69.6 (20.9)
Mean daily minimum °F (°C)	43.5 (6.4)	47.8 (8.8)	54.3 (12.4)	59.6 (15.3)	67.3 (19.6)	72.6 (22.6)	74.1 (23.4)	74.5 (23.6)	70.8 (21.6)	60.9 (16.1)	51.6 (10.9)	45.6 (7.6)	60.2 (15.7)
Mean minimum °F (°C)	27.1 (−2.7)	31.1 (−0.5)	35.7 (2.1)	43.2 (6.2)	54.9 (12.7)	65.5 (18.6)	69.1 (20.6)	68.1 (20.1)	57.6 (14.2)	43.5 (6.4)	35.0 (1.7)	27.5 (−2.5)	23.5 (−4.7)
Record low °F (°C)	12 (−11)	5 (−15)	23 (−5)	28 (−2)	42 (6)	53 (12)	56 (13)	59 (15)	43 (6)	30 (−1)	20 (−7)	10 (−12)	5 (−15)
Average precipitation inches (mm)	5.57 (141)	4.44 (113)	4.48 (114)	3.99 (101)	4.38 (111)	8.40 (213)	9.06 (230)	6.50 (165)	5.77 (147)	4.31 (109)	4.35 (110)	4.17 (106)	65.42 (1,660)
Average precipitation days (≥ 0.01 in)	10.0	7.6	7.4	5.8	6.5	12.2	16.1	14.2	10.8	7.1	7.4	9.6	114.7
Source 1: NOAA
Source 2: National Weather Service (mean maxima/minima 1981–2010)

== Demographics ==
Historical population
Census	Pop.	Note	%±
1860	429		—
1870	593		38.2%
1880	1,084		82.8%
1890	1,280		18.1%
1900	3,212		150.9%
1910	5,024		56.4%
1920	5,160		2.7%
1930	6,531		26.6%
1940	9,052		38.6%
1950	11,505		27.1%
1960	22,561		96.1%
1970	30,922		37.1%
1980	32,602		5.4%
1990	30,495		−6.5%
2000	32,393		6.2%
2010	33,727		4.1%
2020	33,406		−1.0%
2025 (est.)	31,735	▼	−5.0%
U.S. Decennial Census

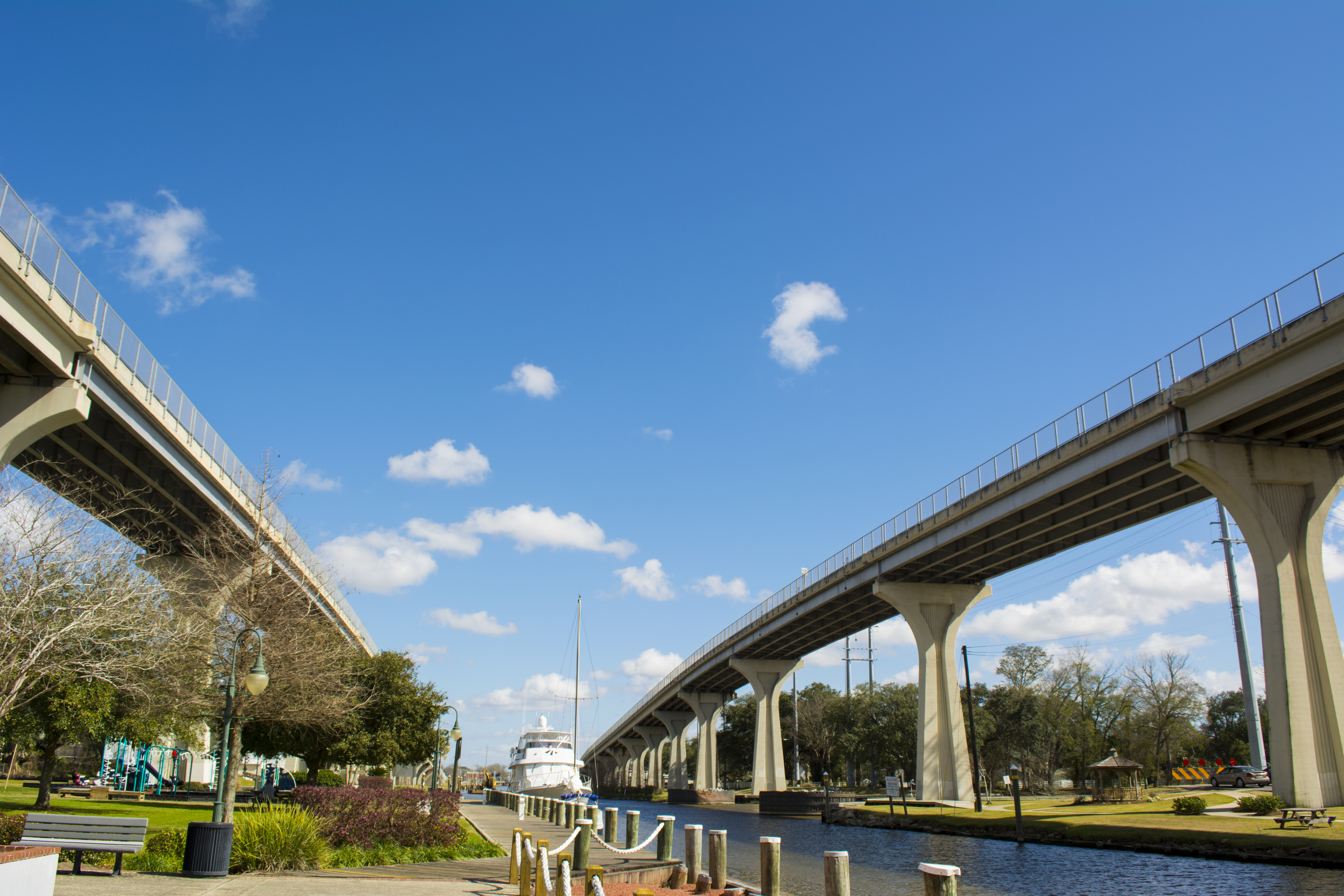
The "Twin Spans" bridges in downtown Houma serve as the main thoroughfare for crossing the Intracoastal Waterway.

Houma racial composition as of 2020
Race	Number	Percentage
White (non-Hispanic)	19,456	58.24%
Black or African American (non-Hispanic)	8,065	24.14%
Native American	1,428	4.27%
Asian	472	1.41%
Pacific Islander	12	0.04%
Other/Mixed	1,537	4.6%
Hispanic or Latino	2,436	7.29%

As of the 2020 United States census, there were 33,406 people, 12,612 households, and 7,970 families residing in the city.

According to the 2019 American Community Survey, the racial and ethnic makeup of the city was 62.1% non-Hispanic white, 23.3% Black or African American, 0.3% Asian alone, 0.1% some other race, 3.9% two or more races, and 4.3% Hispanic and Latin American of any race. At the 2010 census, the racial make up of the city was 67.46% White American, 20.62% Black or African American, 5.45% American Indian and Alaska Native, 1.71% Asian, 0.12% Native Hawaiian or other Pacific Islander, 0.68% from other races, and 1.87% from two or more races; Hispanics and Latin Americans of any race were 5.76% of the population.

In 2019, the median age was 36.8. Of the population aged 18 and older, they made 75.9% of the demographic; 8.1% of the population were aged 5 and under; 14.6% were aged 65 and older. The median income for a household at the 2019 American Community Survey was $42,949 and 23.8% of the population lived at or below the poverty line.

== Education ==
Terrebonne Parish School District operates the city and parish public schools. Houma is home to Louisiana's second-oldest high school, Terrebonne High School. South Terrebonne High School was founded in 1961. H.L. Bourgeois High School, Ellender Memorial High School and Vandebilt Catholic High School are also in Terrebonne Parish. Southdown High School (originally Houma Colored High School) was constructed in the mid-20th century as a segregated school for black students, serving them exclusively from 1946 to 1969. After that the school was integrated as a result of 1964 civil rights legislation.

== Culture ==
Houma and the surrounding communities are a blend of French, Native, Cajun, African, and Creole influences. Initially, the area was colonized by French and Spanish who made their way south through Bayou Lafourche. In the late 18th century, numerous Acadians (later known as Cajuns) settled in the region. The Acadians had been expelled by the British from Nova Scotia during the Seven Years' War for their unwillingness to take a loyalty oath to the British King. The number expelled was approximately 15,000, of which 3,000 eventually settled in this region. Others went to France. As the French, Spanish, Acadians, and Native American peoples mixed over the decades, a unique Cajun culture emerged.

The swampland around Houma resulted in the area being quite isolated from the rest of Louisiana and the United States well into the 1930s. Outside influences such as radio and concomitant popular culture failed to penetrate Cajun culture, so Cajun culture and the use of French language in this region persevered much longer than in cities on the border of Cajun country, such as Lake Charles or Baton Rouge. Traditional Cajun culture in Houma includes the French language, Cajun cuisine, and celebration of Catholic festivals such as Mardi Gras. That folk culture remains evident today and attracts many tourists to the region.

In the 1970s, many South Vietnamese refugees emigrated following the reunification of Vietnam. They settled in Southern Louisiana to work as shrimpers, just as they had in Vietnam. A fairly significant portion of them settled in New Orleans, and many also settled in Houma, as well as in other locations along the Gulf Coast. Many ethnic Vietnamese families continue to work in shrimping, a tradition that has been passed down through their families for several decades.

Downtown Houma has been designated as a historic district and is listed on the National Register of Historic Places. It offers a downtown walking tour and attractions such as the Bayou Terrebonne Waterlife Museum, the Folklife Culture Center, the Regional Military Museum, Southdown Plantation, the Houma-Terrebonne Civic Center, monuments to local armed forces, and local eateries.

Although Houma is rapidly changing, many residents in the surrounding communities continue to make their living from the Gulf, just as their ancestors did. They harvest shrimp, oyster, crab, fish, and engage in trapping, although more have shifted to work in occupations of the oil industry and shipbuilding. According to the United States Government Patent and Trademark Office, Houma, Louisiana, was the site of the deepest oil well in Terrebonne Parish.

Tab Benoit's Voice of the Wetlands Music Festival, established in 2005, takes place annually in Houma, Louisiana, in October.

The annual "Weenie Spaghetti Festival" was first held in Houma in 2024.

== Media ==
The local newspaper is The Courier, founded in 1878 as Le Courrier de Houma by the French-born Lafayette Bernard Filhucan Bazet. He first published it in four-page, half-French half-English editions. Sold to The New York Times Company in 1980, it is now part of GateHouse Media.

The Houma Times is located in Houma. The newspaper is a weekly publication with a website updated daily. It serves the Terrebonne, Lafourche, and St. Mary parishes. In 2014, Houma-based Rushing Media merged with Guidry Group, Inc., which had owned the publication since its inception in 1997.

The following radio stations are located in the Houma-Thibodaux metropolitan area, though several stations licensed to Houma also serve New Orleans and cover all of southeastern Louisiana:

== Transportation ==
Houma is served by Houma-Terrebonne Airport, located 3 miles (4.8 km) southeast of the central business district.

Good Earth Transit is Houma's parish bus system. It has five major routes and serves the surrounding suburban areas, including the small bayou communities and the city of Thibodaux.

Houma relies mainly on roads and personal vehicles as the main form of transportation. The major roads in Houma are:

- US Route 90 (Future I-49)
- LA 311
- Tunnel Boulevard & Honduras Street (LA 3040)
- LA 24 (locally called West Park Avenue (westbound) and Main Street (eastbound))
- LA 182 (New Orleans Boulevard)
- South and North Hollywood Road
- St. Louis Canal Road
- Savanne Road
- Valhi Boulevard

== Notable people ==
- George Arceneaux, U.S. District Court judge from 1979 until his death in office in 1993
- Tab Benoit, blues musician and co-star of the IMAX movie feature Hurricane on the Bayou
- Sherman A. Bernard, Louisiana insurance commissioner 1972–1988, graduated from Terrebonne High School in Houma
- Elward Thomas Brady Jr., state representative from Terrebonne Parish 1972–1976; businessman
- Wanda Brister, operatic mezzo-soprano, formerly on the faculty at Florida State University
- Joe Burks, professional athlete
- Leonard J. Chabert, member of both houses of Louisiana State Legislature from Terrebonne Parish; namesake of Leonard J. Chabert Medical Center in Houma
- Marty J. Chabert, former state senator from Terrebonne and Lafourche parishes
- Norby Chabert, current Republican member of Louisiana State Senate from Terrebonne and Lafourche parishes
- Richie Cunningham, professional athlete
- Allen J. Ellender (1890–1972), president pro tempore and Democratic U.S. senator
- Ron Escheté (1948–2026), jazz guitarist
- Anthony Freeman, Catholic writer and religious
- Shane Gibson, guitarist for Korn
- Skyler Green, gridiron football wide receiver and return specialist
- Johnny Hartman (1923–1983), jazz singer
- Hal Haydel, professional athlete
- Cyril and Libbye Hellier, operatic sopranos
- Brandon Jacobs, NFL running back
- Frank Lewis, professional athlete
- Morris Lottinger Jr., former state representative and retired circuit court judge from Houma
- Morris Lottinger Sr., state representative 1936–1950, House speaker 1948–1950, and state circuit court judge until retirement in 1965
- Jaylin Lucas, American football running back for the Florida State Seminoles
- Jesse Marcel, lieutenant colonel in the United States Air Force who helped administer Operation Crossroads
- Elijah McGuire, NFL running back for the New York Jets
- Jay Pennison, professional athlete
- Audie Pitre, bassist for Acid Bath
- Lloyd Pye, ancient astronauts proponent
- Dax Riggs, frontman for Acid Bath, Deadboy and the Elephantmen, Agents of Oblivion, others
- Maason Smith, National Football League (NFL) athlete
- Chloe Suazo, actress
- Quvenzhané Wallis, young film actress (Beasts of the Southern Wild, 2012)
- J. Louis Watkins Jr., judge of Louisiana First Circuit Court of Appeal 1979–1997; former attorney in Houma
- Justin Williams, MLB outfielder
- Tramon Williams, professional athlete

== Twin towns ==
- Cambrai, Nord, Hauts-de-France, France
- Datça, Muğla Province, Turkey
- Bathurst, New Brunswick, Canada
- In June 2012, Terrebonne Parish signed a letter of intent to become a sister city with Weihai, China, for economic development purposes.

== In popular culture ==
- Houma and the surrounding area are the setting for the Swamp Thing series of comic books.
- V. C. Andrews' novel Ruby (1994) is set in Houma.
- The Suicide Squad is based at Belle Reve in Houma.
- The 1999 films Crazy in Alabama and A Lesson Before Dying were filmed partially in Houma.
- The film The Skeleton Key (2005) is set in Houma and the nearby area of Bayou Gauche.
- Several scenes from the 2013 film The Butler, starring Forest Whitaker and Oprah Winfrey, were filmed in downtown Houma.
- In 1992, Unsolved Mysteries profiled the case of Adam John "AJ" Breaux, a resident of Houma who went missing in 1991.
- The Hulu TV series The Act included a scene in Houma of a young Gypsy Rose Blanchard and Dee Dee Blanchard.
- The 2022 film Where the Crawdads Sing was filmed in and around Houma.
