= Golden Meadow, Louisiana =

- Town
- Location of Golden Meadow in Lafourche Parish, Louisiana.

- Location of Louisiana in the United States
- Coordinates: 29°23′17″N 90°16′10″W
- Country: United States
- State: Louisiana
- Parish: Lafourche
- Named for: Goldenrod

Government
  - Mayor: Joey Bouziga (elected 2012)

Area
  - Total: 2.93 sq mi (7.59 km^{2})
  - Land: 2.45 sq mi (6.34 km^{2})
  - Water: 0.48 sq mi (1.25 km^{2})
- Elevation: 0 ft (0 m)

Population (2020)
  - Total: 1,761
  - Density: 719.8/sq mi (277.91/km^{2})
- Time zone: UTC-6 (CST)
  - Summer (DST): UTC-5 (CDT)
- ZIP code: 70357
- Area code: 985
- FIPS code: 22-29640
- Website: Golden Meadow, Louisiana

Golden Meadow (French: Canal de Yankee) is a town along Bayou Lafourche in Lafourche Parish, Louisiana, United States. The population was 1,761 in 2020. It is part of the Houma–Bayou Cane–Thibodaux metropolitan statistical area. Its main source of revenue is the oil and gas industry. The fishing and seafood industries also have strong economic impacts, with charter fishing, restaurants, and lodging actively serving patrons. The town was once known as a speed trap, but it has since been bypassed by Hwy 3235 and city traffic has been reduced to mostly locals; however, the speed limit is reduced to 50 mph on Hwy 3235 and said highway is still patrolled heavily. As in other places in Louisiana, there is a noticeable presence of Cajun culture, music, and cuisine.

The Golden Meadow name was given by the original land grant owners, Benjamin and Louisa Hobbs Barker of Illinois. In 1839, they named it so because of the yellow flowers growing everywhere. They hoped to become wealthy selling lots to French and English settlers, but abandoned the plan.

== Geography ==
Golden Meadow is located at 29°23′17″N 90°16′10″W (29.388192, -90.269457).

According to the United States Census Bureau, the town has a total area of 2.9 square miles (7.5 km^{2}), of which 2.4 square miles (6.2 km^{2}) is land and 0.5 square miles (1.3 km^{2}) (15.92%) is water.

== Demographics ==
Historical population
Census	Pop.	Note	%±
1950	2,820		—
1960	3,097		9.8%
1970	2,681		−13.4%
1980	2,282		−14.9%
1990	2,049		−10.2%
2000	2,193		7.0%
2010	2,101		−4.2%
2020	1,761		−16.2%
2025 (est.)	1,636	▼	−7.1%
U.S. Decennial Census; 1950 1960 1970 1980; 1990 2000 2010

Golden Meadow first appeared as an unincorporated place in the 1950 U.S. census; and as a town in the 1960 U.S. census.

Golden Meadow racial composition as of 2020
Race	Number	Percentage
White (non-Hispanic)	1,409	80.01%
Black or African American (non-Hispanic)	26	1.48%
Native American	130	7.38%
Asian	10	0.57%
Other/Mixed	89	5.05%
Hispanic or Latino	97	5.51%

As of the 2020 United States census, there were 1,761 people, 754 households, and 535 families residing in the town.

== Government and infrastructure ==
On July 1, 1950, the town marshal, the first head law enforcement agent of the town, took his position and became the first head of the town police department.

The United States Postal Service operates the Golden Meadow Post Office.

== Education ==
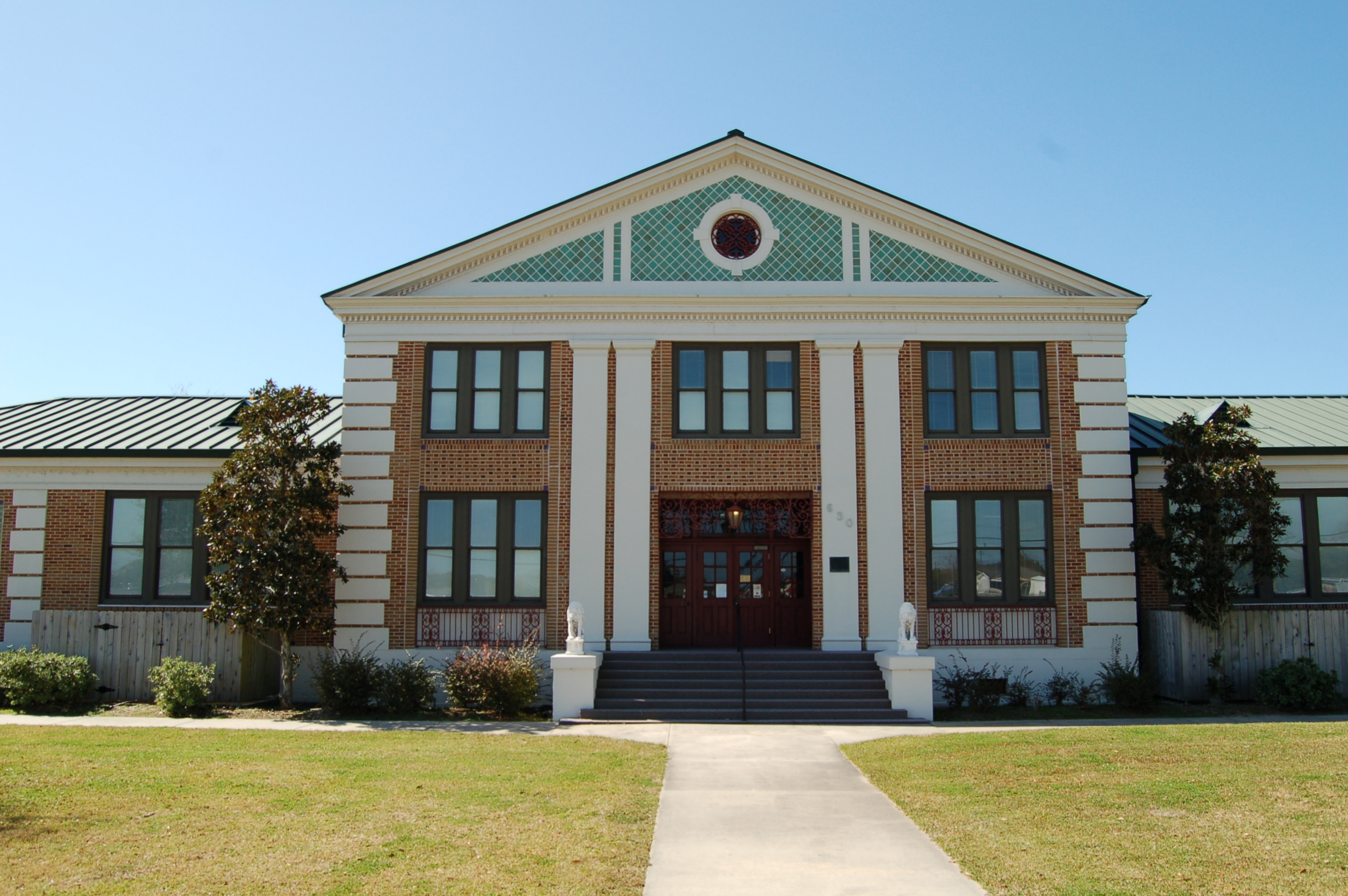
Golden Meadow Middle School (former Golden Meadow High School building)

Lafourche Parish Public Schools is the school district of the whole parish. It operates public schools:

- Golden Meadow Lower Elementary School
- Golden Meadow Upper Elementary School
- Golden Meadow Middle School

South Lafourche High School is in the Galliano census-designated place, north of Golden Meadow, and serves the community.

Francophone private schools were the first educational institutions serving the community. In 1917 the first public elementary school opened. Golden Meadow High School opened in 1933. It was consolidated with Larose-Cut Off High School to form South Lafourche High School in 1966. The former Golden Meadow High building is currently Golden Meadow Middle School.

Lafourche Parish Library operates the Golden Meadow Branch. Hurricane Ida destroyed a previous facility, which meant the parish had to have a new library built.

Fletcher Technical Community College has Lafourche Parish in the college's service area. Additionally, a Delgado Community College document stated that Lafourche Parish was in the college's service area.

== Notable natives and residents ==
- Dee Dee and Gypsy-Rose Blanchard until 2005, when they evacuated to Springfield, Missouri post-Katrina
- Dick Guidry, former member of the Louisiana House of Representatives from Lafourche Parish; graduated from Golden Meadow High School.
