= Lockport Heights, Louisiana =

- Census-designated place
- Location within Louisiana Location within the United States
- Coordinates: 29°39′02″N 90°32′47″W
- Country: United States
- State: Louisiana
- Parish: Lafourche

Area
  - Total: 1.32 sq mi (3.42 km^{2})
  - Land: 1.31 sq mi (3.38 km^{2})
  - Water: 0.015 sq mi (0.04 km^{2})
- Elevation: 3 ft (0.91 m)

Population (2020)
  - Total: 1,171
  - Density: 896.0/sq mi (345.96/km^{2})
- Time zone: UTC-6 (Central (CST))
  - Summer (DST): UTC-5 (CDT)
- Area code: 985
- GNIS feature ID: 543408

Lockport Heights is an unincorporated community and census-designated place in Lafourche Parish, Louisiana, United States. As of the 2020 census, Lockport Heights had a population of 1,171. Louisiana Highway 1 passes through the community.

== Geography ==
According to the U.S. Census Bureau, the community has an area of 1.339 square miles (3.47 km^{2}); 1.309 square miles (3.39 km^{2}) of its area is land, and 0.030 square miles (0.078 km^{2}) is water.

== Demographics ==
Historical population
Census	Pop.	Note	%±
2010	1,286		—
2020	1,171		−8.9%
U.S. Decennial Census

Lockport Heights was first listed as a census designated place in the 2010 U.S. census.

== Education ==
It is within Lafourche Parish Public Schools. Zoned schools include:

- Lockport Lower Elementary School in Lockport
- Lockport Upper Elementary School in Lockport
- Lockport Middle School in Lockport
- Central Lafourche High School in Mathews
