= Cut Off, Louisiana =

- Census-designated place
- Location in Louisiana Location in the United States
- Coordinates: 29°30′55″N 90°20′02″W
- Country: United States
- State: Louisiana
- Parish: Lafourche

Area
  - Total: 14.76 sq mi (38.24 km^{2})
  - Land: 14.64 sq mi (37.92 km^{2})
  - Water: 0.12 sq mi (0.32 km^{2})
- Elevation: 7 ft (2.1 m)

Population (2020)
  - Total: 5,533
  - Density: 377.9/sq mi (145.92/km^{2})
- Time zone: UTC-6 (CST)
  - Summer (DST): UTC-5 (CDT)
- ZIP code: 70345
- Area code: 985
- FIPS code: 22-18930

Cut Off (historically named La Coupe) is a census-designated place (CDP) on the Bayou Lafourche in Lafourche Parish, Louisiana, United States. The population was 5,533 in 2020. It is part of the Houma–Bayou Cane–Thibodaux metropolitan statistical area. Cut Off's ZIP code is 70345, the area code is 985 and local telephone prefixes are 325, 632 and 693.

== History ==
Cut Off had its start by the building of a canal cutoff at that point from Bayou Lafourche northeast to Lake Salvador, to shorten the route to New Orleans. The name (La Coupe, or "The Cut") was French in origin.

== Geography ==
Cut Off is located in south-central Lafourche Parish at 29°30′55″N 90°20′2″W (29.515201, -90.333839), on both sides of Bayou Lafourche. It is bordered to the northwest by Larose and to the south by Galliano.

Louisiana Highway 1 runs through the center of Cut Off, along the west bank of Bayou Lafourche, while Highway 308 runs along the east bank. Highway 3235, a four-lane highway, runs through the west side of the community. All three highways lead northwest into Larose and south into Galliano. Thibodaux, the parish seat, is 37 miles (60 km) to the northwest (upriver), and Port Fourchon on the Gulf of Mexico is 34 miles (55 km) to the south.

According to the United States Census Bureau, the Cut Off CDP has a total area of 14.7 square miles (38.2 km^{2}), of which 14.6 square miles (37.9 km^{2}) are land and 0.1 square miles (0.3 km^{2}), or 0.85%, are water.

== Demographics ==
Historical population
Census	Pop.	Note	%±
1980	5,049		—
1990	5,325		5.5%
2000	5,635		5.8%
2010	5,976		6.1%
2020	5,533		−7.4%

Cut Off racial composition as of 2020
Race	Number	Percentage
White (non-Hispanic)	4,423	79.94%
Black or African American (non-Hispanic)	63	1.14%
Native American	215	3.89%
Asian	70	1.27%
Pacific Islander	1	0.02%
Other/Mixed	240	4.34%
Hispanic or Latino	521	9.42%

As of the 2020 United States census, there were 5,533 people, 2,375 households, and 1,711 families residing in the CDP.

== Notable people ==
- Joe Barry, swamp pop singer; born and died in Cut Off
- Vin Bruce, Cajun vocalist
- Trishelle Cannatella, reality television personality and poker player
- Dick Guidry, former state representative from Lafourche Parish and owner of the disbanded Jet Drive-in Theater, a local landmark in Cut Off
- Bobby Hebert, former New Orleans Saints and Atlanta Falcons quarterback
- Rita Benson LeBlanc, part-owner and former heir apparent of the New Orleans Saints
- Glen Pitre, writer and film director
- Loulan Pitre, Jr., lawyer and former state representative for Lafourche Parish; brother of Glen Pitre

== Government and infrastructure ==
The United States Postal Service operates the Cut Off Post Office.

== Culture ==
- A particular section of the town is known as Côte Blanche, French for "White Coast" because of a statistically abnormal number of white painted homes that lined Bayou Lafourche for much of the early and mid 1900s.
- In a segment of Dirty Jobs, Mike Rowe interviewed a Cut Off alligator farmer.

== Education ==
Lafourche Parish Public Schools operates public schools.

- Cut Off Elementary School

Larose-Cut Off Middle School is in nearby Larose, and serves Cut Off CDP.

South Lafourche High School is in Galliano, and has a Cut Off postal address. It also serves Cut Off.

Cut Off School opened in 1927. In September 1950 the schools of Larose and Cut Off were consolidated into Larose-Cut Off High School. It was then consolidated with Golden Meadow High School to form South Lafourche High School in 1966.

Lafourche Parish Library operates the South Lafourche Library in Galliano, which has a Cut Off postal address. Damage from Hurricane Ida meant that the parish had to rebuild the inside of the library.

Fletcher Technical Community College has Lafourche Parish in the college's service area. Additionally, a Delgado Community College document stated that Lafourche Parish was in the college's service area.
