= Gheens, Louisiana =

- Unincorporated community
- Location within Louisiana Location within the United States
- Coordinates: 29°40′46″N 90°27′45″W
- Country: United States
- State: Louisiana
- Parish: Lafourche
- Elevation: 3 ft (0.91 m)
- Time zone: UTC-6 (Central (CST))
  - Summer (DST): UTC-5 (CDT)
- ZIP code: 70355
- Area code: 985
- GNIS feature ID: 554527

Gheens (also Golden Ranch, Vacherie) is an unincorporated community in Lafourche Parish, Louisiana, United States. Its ZIP code is 70355.

== Education ==
Lafourche Parish Public Schools operates public schools.

The area primary schools would be Lockport Lower and Lockport Upper Elementary Schools in Lockport, and the area junior high school is Lockport Middle School in Lockport. The area high school is Central Lafourche High School.

Lafourche Parish Library operates the Gheens Library.

Fletcher Technical Community College has Lafourche Parish in the college's service area. Additionally, a Delgado Community College document stated that Lafourche Parish was in the college's service area.

== History ==
A plaque located near the Gheens Community Center provides a brief overview of the history of Gheens:

Claude Joseph Dubreuil, Jr. purchased what is today known as Vacherie-Gheens from the Oucha and Chaouacha Indians in the 1740's for 12 head of cattle. He named it La Vacherie, meaning cattle ranch. His plan was to furnish New Orleans markets with beef. In 1879, John R. Gheens of Kentucky purchased a portion of the Dubreuil holdings. In 1890, Gheens and his brothers incorporated the Golden Ranch Sugar and Cattle Co. The post office, established on the plantation, was called Gheens.

Due to transportation challenges in bringing cattle to New Orleans, the Gheens family, involved in the taffy industry, ultimately shifted to focus only on producing sugar for use in their Louisville factory, establishing the community of Gheens' sugarcane heritage. As of 2026, Gheens contains almost a thousand acres of sugarcane fields.

== Mardi Gras ==
Gheens is one of the only two southeastern Louisiana communities that still practice the traditional Mardi Gras chase, a tradition that has taken place in Gheens dating back to the turn of the 20th century. In this event following the community's annual Mardi Gras parade, masked men or "Mardi Gras" descend from trailers to chase and whip the town's children with willow branches, symbolizing atonement from sin. In order to avoid being whipped, children must kneel and say "pardon," meaning "pardon me" in Cajun French; however, many children choose to run from the Mardi Gras, at risk of being whipped. Mardi Gras flogging is primarily symbolic, and Mardi Gras generally deliver, at most, a light tap on the back of the victim's legs.
