= Galliano, Louisiana =

- Census-designated place
- Location in Louisiana Location in the United States
- Coordinates: 29°26′55″N 90°18′26″W
- Country: United States
- State: Louisiana
- Parish: Lafourche

Area
  - Total: 11.15 sq mi (28.88 km^{2})
  - Land: 11.14 sq mi (28.86 km^{2})
  - Water: 0.0039 sq mi (0.01 km^{2})
- Elevation: 3 ft (0.91 m)

Population (2020)
  - Total: 7,100
  - Density: 637.1/sq mi (245.99/km^{2})
- Time zone: UTC-6 (CST)
  - Summer (DST): UTC-5 (CDT)
- ZIP code: 70354
- Area code: 985
- FIPS code: 22-28065

Galliano is an unincorporated community and census-designated place (CDP) on the Bayou Lafourche in Lafourche Parish, Louisiana, United States. As of 2020, its population was 7,100. It is part of the Houma–Bayou Cane–Thibodaux metropolitan statistical area.

== History ==
The area was named by the late postmaster Alzec Autin, who chose the name "Galliano" in honor of an original settler in the area formerly known as Côte Cheramie. Signor Antoine Galliano settled in the vicinity in the late 1700s and had a large farm and a citrus tree orchard. He came from the Kingdom of the Two Sicilies in the vicinity of Naples, Italy, where he was in the service of the King of Spain.

A popular local legend is that his wife, Julia, had no last name and was related closely to the King of Spain. Antoine Galliano or Galiano (Spanish spelling) had fallen in love with a lady of noble birth – probably a princess, since he was in the King's Guard. He and his wife were sent to Louisiana (New Spain) and settled in the area known now as Galliano. His descendants still live in the area, and the name Galliano is spelled in the Italian style, but some descendants spell it Galiano in the Spanish tradition.

The area was also the home of a large Acadian French or Cajun population, and Cajun French is a predominant language along with English.

== Geography ==
Galliano is located in southern Lafourche Parish at 29°26′55″N 90°18′26″W (29.448539, -90.307274), on both sides of Bayou Lafourche. The community is bordered to the northwest by Cut Off and to the south by Golden Meadow.

Louisiana Highway 1 runs through the community along the west bank of Bayou Lafourche, while Highway 308 runs along the east side. There are two bridges across Bayou Lafourche within the CDP. Four-lane Highway 3235 runs through the west side of the community. All three highway lead northwest (upriver) 11 miles (18 km) to Larose and south 5 miles (8 km) to Golden Meadow. Thibodaux, the parish seat, is 45 miles (72 km) to the northwest up Highway 1, while Port Fourchon on the Gulf of Mexico is 26 miles (42 km) to the south. South Lafourche Leonard Miller Jr. Airport is 2 miles (3 km) east of Galliano.

According to the United States Census Bureau, the Galliano CDP has a total area of 11.2 square miles (28.9 km^{2}), of which 0.004 square miles (0.01 km^{2}), or 0.04%, are water.

The Pointe-aux-Chenes Wildlife Management Area borders Galliano to the west. Access to the area can be had through a marina and boat launch in southwest Galliano.

=== Climate ===
The climate in this area is characterized by hot, humid summers and generally mild to cool winters. According to the Köppen Climate Classification system, Galliano has a humid subtropical climate, abbreviated "Cfa" on climate maps.

Climate data for Galliano, Louisiana (1991–2020 normals, extremes 1968–2021)
| Month | Jan | Feb | Mar | Apr | May | Jun | Jul | Aug | Sep | Oct | Nov | Dec | Year |
|---|---|---|---|---|---|---|---|---|---|---|---|---|---|
| Record high °F (°C) | 83 (28) | 84 (29) | 87 (31) | 91 (33) | 95 (35) | 99 (37) | 100 (38) | 100 (38) | 98 (37) | 94 (34) | 86 (30) | 85 (29) | 100 (38) |
| Mean maximum °F (°C) | 76.4 (24.7) | 78.2 (25.7) | 81.0 (27.2) | 83.9 (28.8) | 89.2 (31.8) | 92.6 (33.7) | 94.3 (34.6) | 94.5 (34.7) | 92.1 (33.4) | 87.6 (30.9) | 82.2 (27.9) | 78.3 (25.7) | 95.4 (35.2) |
| Mean daily maximum °F (°C) | 62.9 (17.2) | 66.1 (18.9) | 71.4 (21.9) | 76.6 (24.8) | 82.9 (28.3) | 87.7 (30.9) | 89.3 (31.8) | 89.4 (31.9) | 86.4 (30.2) | 79.6 (26.4) | 71.2 (21.8) | 64.9 (18.3) | 77.4 (25.2) |
| Daily mean °F (°C) | 53.9 (12.2) | 57.3 (14.1) | 63.0 (17.2) | 68.6 (20.3) | 75.5 (24.2) | 80.8 (27.1) | 82.4 (28.0) | 82.5 (28.1) | 79.4 (26.3) | 71.2 (21.8) | 61.7 (16.5) | 56.2 (13.4) | 69.4 (20.8) |
| Mean daily minimum °F (°C) | 44.8 (7.1) | 48.4 (9.1) | 54.6 (12.6) | 60.6 (15.9) | 68.2 (20.1) | 74.0 (23.3) | 75.6 (24.2) | 75.6 (24.2) | 72.3 (22.4) | 62.8 (17.1) | 52.2 (11.2) | 47.4 (8.6) | 61.4 (16.3) |
| Mean minimum °F (°C) | 27.7 (−2.4) | 32.5 (0.3) | 35.9 (2.2) | 44.5 (6.9) | 54.8 (12.7) | 66.5 (19.2) | 70.1 (21.2) | 69.7 (20.9) | 62.5 (16.9) | 46.6 (8.1) | 35.3 (1.8) | 31.4 (−0.3) | 25.6 (−3.6) |
| Record low °F (°C) | 14 (−10) | 12 (−11) | 21 (−6) | 35 (2) | 44 (7) | 50 (10) | 63 (17) | 62 (17) | 52 (11) | 34 (1) | 24 (−4) | 10 (−12) | 10 (−12) |
| Average precipitation inches (mm) | 5.58 (142) | 4.16 (106) | 4.66 (118) | 4.37 (111) | 5.09 (129) | 6.87 (174) | 9.19 (233) | 7.64 (194) | 6.62 (168) | 4.34 (110) | 3.48 (88) | 4.68 (119) | 66.68 (1,694) |
| Average precipitation days (≥ 0.01 in) | 9.4 | 8.6 | 7.5 | 6.1 | 6.7 | 12.1 | 15.5 | 14.7 | 10.8 | 7.5 | 6.7 | 9.2 | 114.8 |
Source: NOAA

== Demographics ==
Historical population
| Census | Pop. | Note | %± |
|---|---|---|---|
| 1980 | 5,159 | | — |
| 1990 | 4,294 | | −16.8% |
| 2000 | 7,356 | | 71.3% |
| 2010 | 7,676 | | 4.4% |
| 2020 | 7,100 | | −7.5% |
U.S. Decennial Census; 1950 1960 1970 1980; 1990 2000 2010

Galliano first appeared as a census designated place in the 1980 United States census.

Galliano racial composition as of 2020
| Race | Number | Percentage |
|---|---|---|
| White (non-Hispanic) | 5,448 | 76.73% |
| Black or African American (non-Hispanic) | 142 | 2.0% |
| Native American | 344 | 4.85% |
| Asian | 66 | 0.93% |
| Other/Mixed | 266 | 3.75% |
| Hispanic or Latino | 834 | 11.75% |

As of the 2020 United States census, there were 7,100 people, 2,841 households, and 1,907 families residing in the CDP.

== Government and infrastructure ==
The United States Postal Service operates the Galliano Post Office.

== Education ==
Lafourche Parish Public Schools operates public schools. Galliano Elementary School is in the community. Residents south of 17982 West Main and East 120 are instead zoned to Golden Meadow Lower Elementary and Golden Meadow Upper Elementary.

Residents south of West 106 (Bully Camp Road) and East 74 are zoned to Golden Meadow Middle School while those north are zoned to Larose-Cut Off Middle School.

South Lafourche High School is also in Galliano CDP and serves all of the territory.

Lafourche Parish Library operates the South Lafourche Library in Galliano, which has a Cut Off postal address. Damage from Hurricane Ida meant that the parish had to rebuild the inside of the library. There was a previous Cut Off Galliano Branch Library.

Fletcher Technical Community College has Lafourche Parish in the college's service area. Additionally, a Delgado Community College document stated that Lafourche Parish was in the college's service area.

== Notable people ==
- Dick Guidry, former member of the Louisiana House of Representatives
- Bobby Hebert, sportscaster and former NFL quarterback
- Hal Martin, stock car driver
- Ed Orgeron, LSU football head coach
- Teddy Roe, Chicago underworld figure
- Alzina Toups, Cajun chef
