= Delta Farms, Louisiana =

Area in Lafourche Parish, Louisiana, U.S.

Coordinates: 29°36′00″N 90°19′48″W

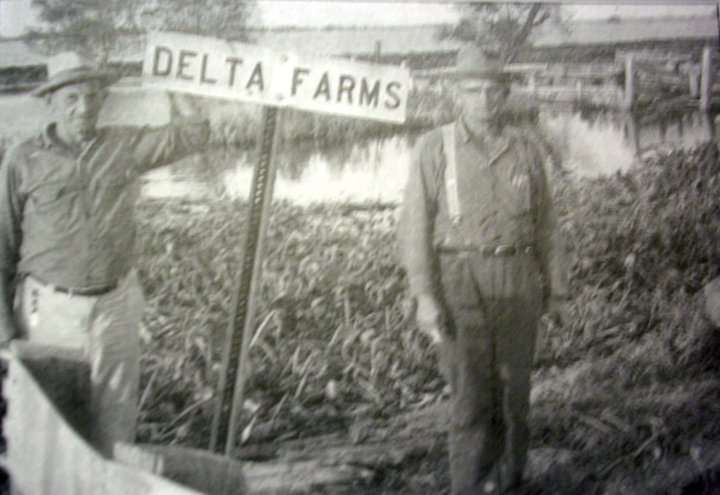
Lawrence "Paca" Dufrene and Abel Theriot at Delta Farms, 1930s

Delta Farms is an area in Lafourche Parish, just north of Larose. It was originally a swamp area that was surrounded by levees to create a farmland.

== History ==
In its heyday Delta Farms had a school, general merchandise store, post office, blacksmith shop, cotton gin and a hotel.

- 1904–1905: Levees built and land drained north of Larose, by a group of investors in Cincinnati. Around 3200 acres was drained.
- 1908–1909: Home and building construction began near the Harang Canal which eventually became the Intracoastal Canal.
- 1911: First child born in the community.
- 1919: The Country Gentleman magazine wrote an article about reclamation projects called "Lifting Farms out of Water" which focused on Delta Farms.
- Late 1920s: Telephone service came to Delta Farms.
- 1939: The hotel was torn down and another, the Larose Hotel, was built at the intersection of East 2nd Street (Peanut Street) and Highway 308.
- 1930s to 1940s: Delta Farms gradually changed from farming to cattle production.
- 1961: Delta Farms flooded when the levees failed. The cattle were moved up Peanut Street and across the Bayou Lafourche Bridge to land on the west side of the bayou owned by one of the cattlemen. The land was re-drained, although only a few families returned.
- 1971: Levee broke, flooding all the land. A barge was sunk near the break but it did not stop the water flow. By then the owners of the land were making money from oil and gas so they decided not to re-drain the land again.

Today all of Delta Farms is flooded and used as a fishing and hunting area. The Delta Farms Area has been renamed the Dixie Delta Canal.
