= Choctaw, Louisiana =

- Census-designated place
- Location within Louisiana Location within the United States
- Coordinates: 29°50′21″N 90°41′27″W
- Country: United States
- State: Louisiana
- Parish: Lafourche

Area
  - Total: 6.25 sq mi (16.19 km^{2})
  - Land: 6.25 sq mi (16.19 km^{2})
  - Water: 0 sq mi (0.00 km^{2})
- Elevation: 3 ft (0.91 m)

Population (2020)
  - Total: 775
  - Density: 124.0/sq mi (47.87/km^{2})
- Time zone: UTC-6 (Central (CST))
  - Summer (DST): UTC-5 (CDT)
- Area code: 985
- GNIS feature ID: 557805

Choctaw is an unincorporated community and census-designated place in Lafourche Parish, Louisiana, United States. As of the 2020 census, Choctaw had a population of 775.

== Geography ==
According to the U.S. Census Bureau, the community has an area of 6.318 square miles (16.36 km^{2}), all land

== Demographics ==
Historical population
Census	Pop.	Note	%±
2010	879		—
2020	775		−11.8%
U.S. Decennial Census

Choctaw was first listed as a census designated place in the 2010 U.S. census.

== Education ==
Choctaw is within Lafourche Parish Public Schools and served by Bayou Boeuf Elementary School, Sixth Ward Middle School, and Thibodaux High School.

Lafourche Parish Library operates the Choctaw Branch Library.

Fletcher Technical Community College has Lafourche Parish in the college's service area. Additionally, a Delgado Community College document stated that Lafourche Parish was in the college's service area.
