= Larose, Louisiana =

- Census-designated place
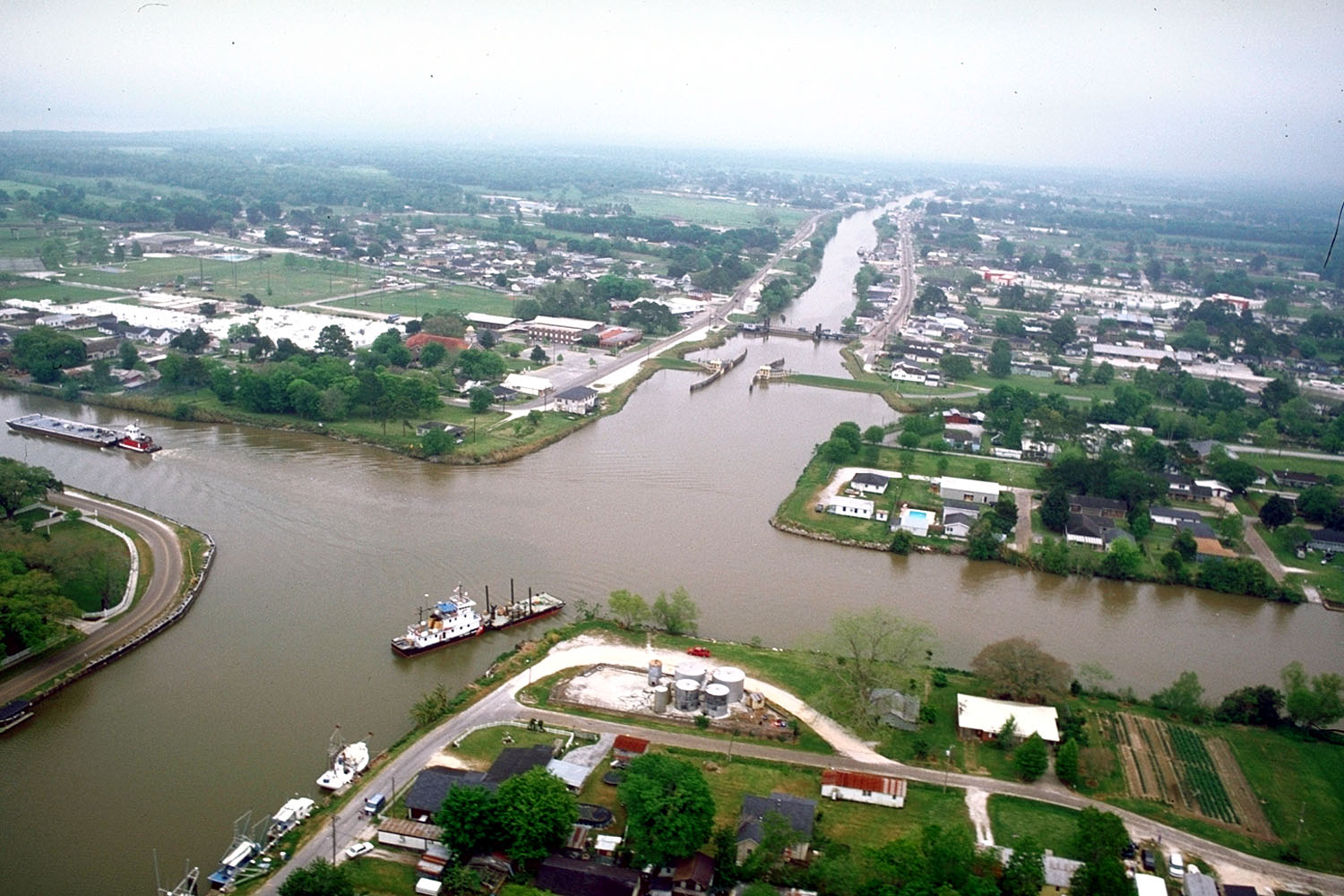
- Aerial view of Larose at the intersection of Bayou Lafourche and the Gulf Intracoastal Waterway. View is to the east-southeast. The bayou runs off towards the Gulf of Mexico at the top. The waterway crosses the picture left–right.

- Location in Louisiana Location in the United States
- Coordinates: 29°34′02″N 90°22′34″W
- Country: United States
- State: Louisiana
- Parish: Lafourche

Area
  - Total: 11.17 sq mi (28.92 km^{2})
  - Land: 10.87 sq mi (28.15 km^{2})
  - Water: 0.30 sq mi (0.77 km^{2})
- Elevation: 8 ft (2.4 m)

Population (2020)
  - Total: 6,763
  - Density: 622.3/sq mi (240.27/km^{2})
- Time zone: UTC-6 (CST)
  - Summer (DST): UTC-5 (CDT)
- ZIP code: 70373
- Area code: 985
- FIPS code: 22-42135

Larose is an unincorporated community and census-designated place (CDP) in Lafourche Parish, Louisiana, United States. The population was 6,763 in 2020. It is part of the Houma–Bayou Cane–Thibodaux metropolitan statistical area.

== Geography ==
Larose is located in south-central Lafourche Parish at 29°34′2″N 90°22′34″W (29.567328, -90.376074). It is bordered to the southeast by the community of Cut Off. Bayou Lafourche and the Gulf Intracoastal Waterway intersect in the center of Larose.

Louisiana Highways 1 and 308 run through Larose on opposite sides of Bayou Lafourche, Highway 1 to the south and Highway 308 to the north. Both highways lead northwest along Bayou Lafourche 12 miles (19 km) to Lockport and southeast 16 miles (26 km) to Golden Meadow. Louisiana Highway 3235, a four-lane bypass, leads southeast from Larose to Golden Meadow as well. Louisiana Highway 24 leads west from Larose 24 miles (39 km) to Houma.

According to the United States Census Bureau, the Larose CDP has a total area of 11.2 square miles (28.9 km^{2}), of which 10.8 square miles (28.1 km^{2}) are land and 0.3 square miles (0.8 km^{2}), or 2.67%, are water.

== Notable events ==
=== 1964 tornado ===
On October 3, 1964, an F4 tornado moved through the area during the Hurricane Hilda tornado outbreak, severely damaging or destroying numerous homes and vehicles, killing 22 people, and injuring 165 others. The tornado caused $2.5 million (1964 USD) in damage. Additionally, it was the deadliest tornado to have been produced by a tropical cyclone since 1900, and one of only two tornadoes spawned by a tropical cyclone on record to have attained F4 intensity.

== Demographics ==
Historical population
Census	Pop.	Note	%±
1950	1,286		—
1960	2,796		117.4%
1970	4,267		52.6%
1980	5,234		22.7%
1990	5,772		10.3%
2000	7,306		26.6%
2010	7,400		1.3%
2020	6,763		−8.6%
U.S. Decennial Census; 1950 1960 1970 1980; 1990 2000 2010

Larose first appeared as an unincorporated place in the 1950 U.S. census; and a census designated place in the 1980 United States census.

Larose racial composition as of 2020
Race	Number	Percentage
White (non-Hispanic)	5,176	76.53%
Black or African American (non-Hispanic)	284	4.2%
Native American	278	4.11%
Asian	191	2.82%
Pacific Islander	2	0.03%
Other/Mixed	253	3.74%
Hispanic or Latino	579	8.56%

As of the 2020 United States census, there were 6,763 people, 2,671 households, and 1,839 families residing in the CDP.

== Government and infrastructure ==
The United States Postal Service operates the Larose Post Office.

== Education ==
Lafourche Parish Public Schools operates public schools.

- North Larose Elementary School
- South Larose Elementary School
- Larose-Cut Off Middle School

South Lafourche High School is in nearby Galliano CDP and serves Larose.

In January 1916 the first public school in Larose, Larose Consolidated School, opened. In September 1950 the schools of Larose and Cut Off were consolidated into Larose-Cut Off High School. It was then consolidated with Golden Meadow High School to form South Lafourche High School in 1966.

Lafourche Parish Library operates the Larose Library.

Fletcher Technical Community College has Lafourche Parish in the college's service area. Additionally, a Delgado Community College document stated that Lafourche Parish was in the college's service area.

== Notable people ==
- Ed Orgeron, head coach for the LSU Tigers football team, 2016-21; head coach at Ole Miss, 2005-07
- Bob Brunet, former player for the Washington Redskins
- Wyatt Freeman, pro skateboarder
- Devin Saucedo, Dungeons & Dragons pro player
