= Raceland, Louisiana =

- Census-designated place
- Location in Louisiana Location in the United States
- Coordinates: 29°43′21″N 90°36′19″W
- Country: United States
- State: Louisiana
- Parish: Lafourche

Area
  - Total: 21.62 sq mi (55.99 km^{2})
  - Land: 21.57 sq mi (55.86 km^{2})
  - Water: 0.050 sq mi (0.13 km^{2})
- Elevation: 14 ft (4.3 m)

Population (2020)
  - Total: 9,768
  - Density: 452.9/sq mi (174.86/km^{2})
- Time zone: UTC-6 (CST)
  - Summer (DST): UTC-5 (CDT)
- ZIP Code: 70394
- Area code: 985
- FIPS code: 22-63155

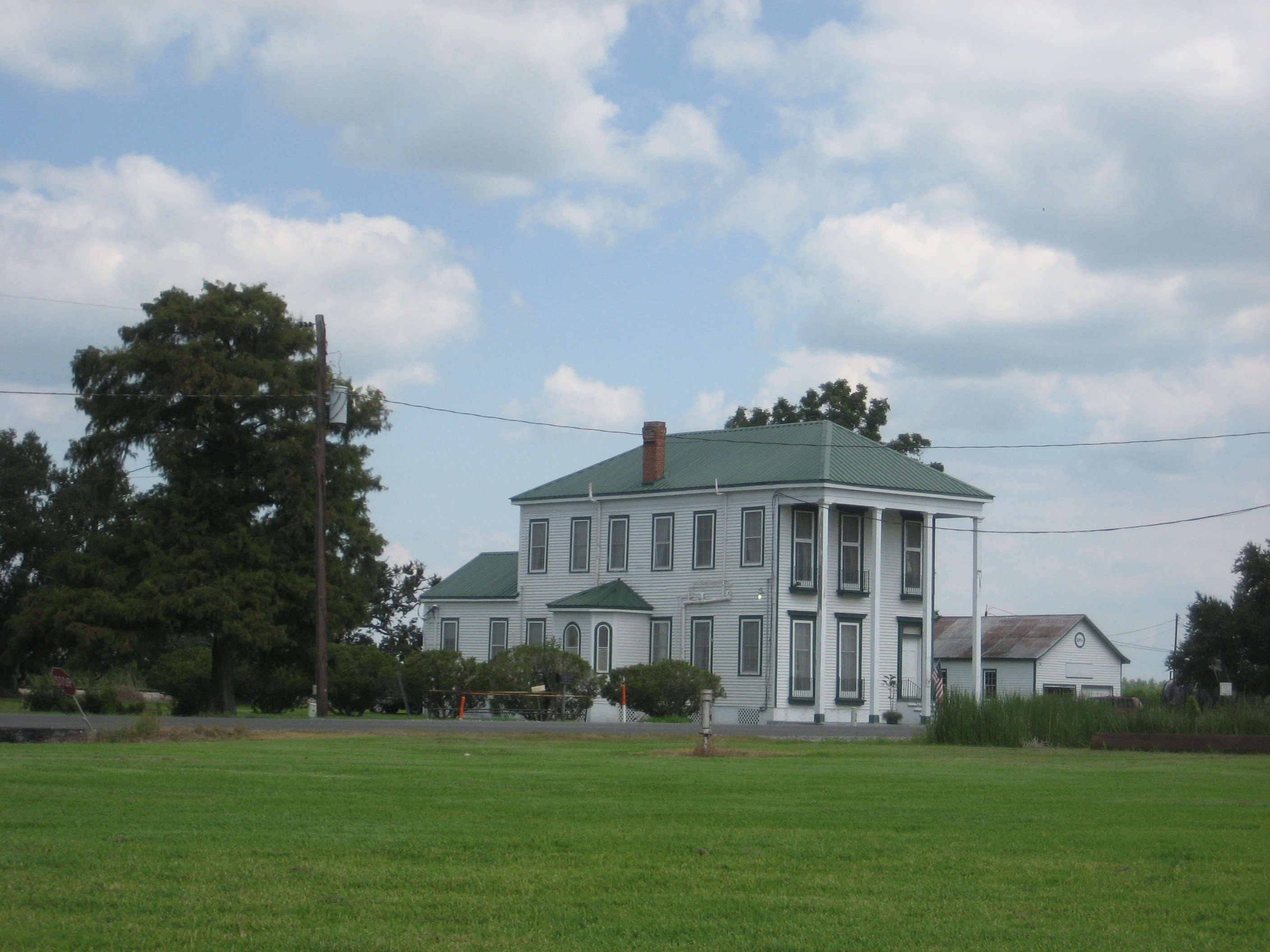
A house in Raceland

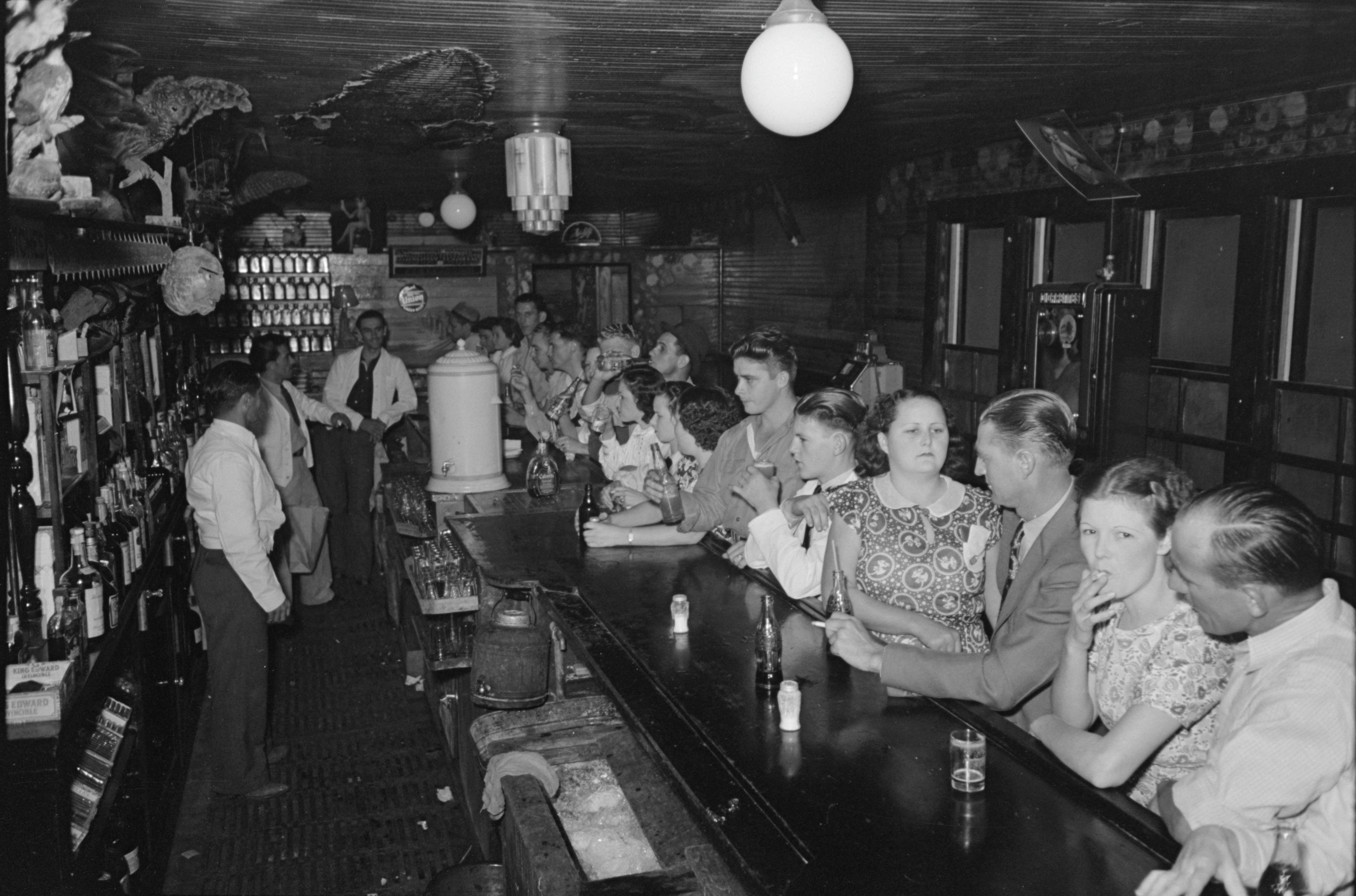
Drinking at the bar, crab boil night, Raceland, September 1938

Raceland is an unincorporated community and census-designated place (CDP) on Bayou Lafourche in Lafourche Parish, Louisiana, United States. The population was 9,768 in 2020. It is part of the Houma–Bayou Cane–Thibodaux metropolitan statistical area.

According to the Louisiana Office of Tourism, Raceland was named for the Race family that once owned a large plantation named "Raceland" on Bayou Lafourche.

Raceland sugar plantation was founded by Ebeneezer Eaton Kittredge and his son in law Fayette Clay Ewing. On April 19, 1855, a daughter of Kittredge, Olivia Corrinne, married George W. Race. The plantation was named Raceland the same year in honor of the young couple who made it their first home where their children were born.

== Geography ==
Raceland is located at 29°43′21″N 90°36′19″W (29.722576, -90.605172), on both sides of Bayou Lafourche. It is bordered to the southeast by Mathews.

U.S. Route 90 (future Interstate 49) passes through the southeast part of Raceland, leading northeast 44 miles (71 km) to New Orleans and west 40 miles (64 km) to Morgan City. Louisiana Highways 1 and 308 pass through the center of Raceland, on the south and the north sides of Bayou Lafourche, respectively. Both highways lead southeast (downriver) 7 miles (11 km) to Lockport and northwest (upriver) 15 miles (24 km) to Thibodaux, the parish seat. Louisiana Highway 182 passes through the center of Raceland on the old route of US-90; it leads northeast 3.5 miles (5.6 km) to US-90 and southwest 12 miles (19 km) to Houma.

According to the United States Census Bureau, the Raceland CDP has a total area of 21.6 square miles (56.0 km^{2}), of which 0.04 square miles (0.1 km^{2}), or 0.23%, are water.

== Demographics ==
Historical population
Census	Pop.	Note	%±
1950	2,025		—
1960	3,666		81.0%
1970	4,880		33.1%
1980	6,302		29.1%
1990	5,564		−11.7%
2000	10,224		83.8%
2010	10,193		−0.3%
2020	9,768		−4.2%
U.S. Decennial Census; 1950 1960 1970 1980; 1990 2000 2010

Raceland first appeared as an unincorporated place in the 1950 U.S. census; and was redesignated as a census designated place in the 1980 United States census.

Raceland racial composition as of 2020
Race	Number	Percentage
White (non-Hispanic)	6,163	63.09%
Black or African American (non-Hispanic)	2,749	28.14%
Native American	108	1.11%
Asian	38	0.39%
Pacific Islander	2	0.02%
Other/Mixed	305	3.12%
Hispanic or Latino	403	4.13%

As of the 2020 United States census, there were 9,768 people, 3,971 households, and 2,812 families residing in the CDP.

== Government and infrastructure ==
The U.S. Postal Service operates the Raceland Post Office.

== Education ==
Lafourche Parish Public Schools operates public schools.

- Raceland Lower Elementary School
- Raceland Upper Elementary School
- Raceland Middle School

Central Lafourche High School is in Mathews, and has a Raceland postal address. The school serves all of Raceland.

Raceland High School opened in 1912 and was expanded in 1924; it was consolidated into Lafourche Central High along with Lockport High School in 1966. An elementary school occupies the former Raceland High. In the era before desegregation (circa 1969) Raceland Colored School educated black residents.

Lafourche Parish Library operates the Raceland Branch.

Fletcher Technical Community College has Lafourche Parish in the college's service area. Additionally, a Delgado Community College document stated that Lafourche Parish was in the college's service area.

== Notable people ==
- Gypsy-Rose Blanchard, convicted murderer and notable true crime personality; born in Raceland.
- Donald G. Bollinger, founder of Bollinger Shipyards (1946) and state chairman of the Republican Party of Louisiana (1986–1988); born and died in Raceland, resided as an adult in Lockport
- Jimmy Clanton, singer and actor; born in Raceland
- Ron Estay, football player, All-American defensive lineman for LSU; played professionally for the Canadian Football League's Edmonton Eskimos
- Aaron Loup, pitcher for the Los Angeles Angels
- Punch Miller, jazz musician; born in Raceland
- Larry Wilson, basketball player and NBA draft pick
