= South Lafourche Leonard Miller Jr. Airport =

- IATA: none; ICAO: KGAO; FAA LID: GAO

Summary
- Airport type: Public
- Owner: Greater Lafourche Port Commission
- Serves: Galliano, Louisiana
- Elevation AMSL: 1 ft / 0.3 m
- Coordinates: 29°26′28″N 090°15′40″W

Map
- Location of airport in Louisiana GAO (the United States)

Runways
Direction	Length		Surface
Direction	ft	m	Surface
18/36	6,502	1,982	Asphalt

Helipads
Number	Length		Surface
Number	ft	m	Surface
H1	60	18	Concrete

Statistics (2012)
- Aircraft operations: 14,004
- Based aircraft: 29
- Source: Federal Aviation Administration

South Lafourche Leonard Miller Jr. Airport (ICAO: KGAO, FAA LID: GAO, formerly L49) is a public use airport in Lafourche Parish, Louisiana, United States. It is owned by the Greater Lafourche Port Commission and located one nautical mile (2 km) east of the central business district of Galliano, Louisiana. This airport is included in the National Plan of Integrated Airport Systems for 2011–2015, which categorized it as a general aviation facility.

Although many U.S. airports use the same three-letter location identifier for the FAA and IATA, this airport is assigned GAO by the FAA but has no designation from the IATA (which assigned GAO to Los Canos Airport in Guantanamo, Cuba).

== Facilities and aircraft ==
South Lafourche Leonard Miller Jr. Airport covers an area of 390 acres (158 ha) at an elevation of 1 feet (0.3 m) above mean sea level. It has one runway designated 18/36 with an asphalt surface measuring 6,502 by 100 feet (1,982 x 30 m). It also has one helipad designated H1 with a concrete surface measuring 60 by 60 feet (18 x 18 m).

For the 12-month period ending April 12, 2012, the airport had 14,004 aircraft operations, an average of 38 per day: 99.6% general aviation and 0.4% military. At that time there were 29 aircraft based at this airport: 58.6% helicopter, 27.6% single-engine, and 13.8% jet.

== See also ==
- List of airports in Louisiana
