= Larry Wilson (basketball) =

American basketball player

Personal information
- Born: Raceland, Louisiana, U.S.
- Listed height: 6 ft 5 in (1.96 m)
- Listed weight: 200 lb (91 kg)

Career information
- High school: Central Lafourche (Mathews, Louisiana)
- College: Nicholls (1975–1979)
- NBA draft: 1979: 2nd round, 38th overall pick
- Drafted by: Atlanta Hawks
- Position: Small forward

Career highlights
- 2× Gulf South Player of the Year (1977, 1979); 3× First-team All-Gulf South (1977–1979); Second-team All-Gulf South (1976); Third-team Parade All-American (1975)
- Stats at Basketball Reference

Larry Wilson is an American former basketball player. Born in Raceland, Louisiana, he attended Central Lafourche High School in nearby Mathews. Although he originally harbored dreams of playing football, Wilson was instead encouraged to play basketball due to his height. He emerged as a star at Central Lafourche as he averaged 30 points per game during his final two seasons and was named Louisiana's Most Valuable Player during his senior season in 1975. With the constant attendance of coaches from major colleges at his games, Wilson was one of the nation's most sought-after prospects and received an estimated 250 athletic scholarship offers.

At the end of his high school career, Wilson initially committed to play for the LSU Tigers. A few weeks later, he changed his mind and decided to play for the Division II Nicholls Colonels due to his good relationship with head coach Don Landry and a desire to play close to home for his family. With the Colonels, Wilson led the Gulf South Conference in scoring for four consecutive seasons and was named the conference's Player of the Year twice. He ranks first in total points and fourth in total rebounds for the Colonels program.

Wilson was selected by the Atlanta Hawks as the 38th overall pick in the 1979 NBA draft. During a team practice, he slipped on a wet patch on the court and stretched every major ligament in his knee. Wilson was unable to play to his full potential again and retired in 1980 without having played a game professionally. He returned to his hometown of Raceland, where he gained employment with Bollinger Shipyards and coached youth basketball.

Wilson was inducted into the Louisiana Sports Hall of Fame in 2010.
