= Loulan Pitre Jr. =

American politician

Loulan J. Pitre Jr.

Louisiana State Representative for District 54 (Lafourche and Jefferson parishes)
- In office 2000–2008
- Preceded by: Mitch Theriot
- Succeeded by: Jerry "Truck" Gisclair

Personal details
- Born: December 1961 (age 64) Cut Off, Lafourche Parish; Louisiana, USA
- Relations: Holland Pitre (brother), Wayne Pitre (brother), Glen Pitre (brother), Tiffany Peperone Pitre (wife)
- Parent(s): Loulan Sr. and Emelia Chabert Pitre
- Education: Harvard University A.B. Harvard Law School J.D.
- Occupation: Lawyer

Loulan J. Pitre Jr. (born December 1961) is a lawyer in New Orleans, Louisiana, who focuses his work on development, construction, and operations of energy, environmental, and infrastructure projects. His law practice includes entity formation and governance, complex land rights issues, construction procurement and management, environmental and coastal permitting issues, and dispute resolution. He was educated at Harvard University (A.B. magna cum laude, 1983) and Harvard Law School (J.D., 1986). He is Partner in Charge of Kelly Hart Pitre, the Louisiana offices of the Kelly Hart law firm.

== Background ==
Loulan Pitre Jr. attended the highly selective Telluride Association Summer Program in 1978 and was selected as a Presidential Scholar in 1979, one of 121 nationwide. He was also a National Merit Scholar and is an Eagle Scout. He graduated from South Lafourche High School in 1979.

Pitre Jr. was educated at both Harvard University (A.B. magna cum laude, 1983) and Harvard Law School (J.D., 1986) in Cambridge, Massachusetts. At Harvard College, Pitre served as co-chair of Dunster House's House Committee, its student governing body. While in law school, Pitre was selected for a judicial clerkship on the United States Court of Appeals for the Fifth Circuit by the late Judge Albert Tate Jr., but Judge Tate died before the term of the clerkship. Pitre's Harvard Law School classmates elected him permanent class secretary, and he gave the class address at commencement. He has served on the board of directors of the Harvard Alumni Association and as president of the Harvard Club of Louisiana.

== Legislative elections ==
As Pitre completed his eight years in the legislature, the Governor-Elect appointed Loulan as Chair of the Transition Advisory Group on Coastal Restoration and Flood Control.

Preceded by Mitch Theriot	Louisiana State Representative for District 54 (Lafourche and Jefferson parishes); 2000–2008	Succeeded by Jerry "Truck" Gisclair
