= Lockport Heights =

Lockport Heights may refer to a place in the United States:

- Lockport Heights, Illinois, a census-designated place
- Lockport Heights, Louisiana, a census-designated place
