= Bayou Country Club, Louisiana =

- Census-designated place
- Location within Louisiana Location within the United States
- Coordinates: 29°46′48″N 90°47′22″W
- Country: United States
- State: Louisiana
- Parish: Lafourche

Area
  - Total: 0.78 sq mi (2.02 km^{2})
  - Land: 0.78 sq mi (2.02 km^{2})
  - Water: 0 sq mi (0.00 km^{2})
- Elevation: 7 ft (2.1 m)

Population (2020)
  - Total: 1,304
  - Density: 1,675.2/sq mi (646.81/km^{2})
- Time zone: UTC-6 (Central (CST))
  - Summer (DST): UTC-5 (CDT)
- ZIP code: 70301
- Area code: 985
- GNIS feature ID: 2583528

Bayou Country Club is an unincorporated community and census-designated place in Lafourche Parish, Louisiana, United States. As of the 2020 census, Bayou Country Club had a population of 1,304. Louisiana Highway 1 passes through the community.

== Geography ==
According to the U.S. Census Bureau, the community has an area of 0.829 square miles (2.15 km^{2}), all land.

== Demographics ==
Historical population
Census	Pop.	Note	%±
2010	1,396		—
2020	1,304		−6.6%
U.S. Decennial Census

Bayou Country Club was first listed as a census designated place in the 2010 U.S. census.

== Education ==
The school district is Lafourche Parish Public Schools.

Fletcher Technical Community College has Lafourche Parish in the college's service area. Additionally, a Delgado Community College document stated that Lafourche Parish was in the college's service area.
