= Mathews, Louisiana =

- Census-designated place
- Location in Louisiana Location in the United States
- Coordinates: 29°41′02″N 90°33′02″W
- Country: United States
- State: Louisiana
- Parish: Lafourche

Area
  - Total: 3.98 sq mi (10.31 km^{2})
  - Land: 3.98 sq mi (10.31 km^{2})
  - Water: 0 sq mi (0.00 km^{2})
- Elevation: 10 ft (3.0 m)

Population (2020)
  - Total: 2,273
  - Density: 570.9/sq mi (220.43/km^{2})
- Time zone: UTC-6 (CST)
  - Summer (DST): UTC-5 (CDT)
- ZIP code: 70375
- Area code: 985
- FIPS code: 22-49170

Mathews is a census-designated place (CDP) on Bayou Lafourche in Lafourche Parish, Louisiana, United States. The population was 2,273 in 2020. It is part of the Houma–Bayou Cane–Thibodaux metropolitan statistical area.

== History ==
On August 20, 2007, a former teacher's aide Amy Hebert fatally stabbed her children, Camille Catherine Hebert, age 9; and mildly autistic Braxton John Hebert, age 7; and the family dog. She was sentenced to life in prison.

== Geography ==
Mathews is located at 29°41′2″N 90°33′2″W (29.683825, -90.550470).

According to the United States Census Bureau, the CDP has a total area of 4.0 square miles (10.3 km^{2}), all land.

It is in the central part of the parish and is bordered by Lockport and Raceland.

== Demographics ==
Historical population
Census	Pop.	Note	%±
1990	3,009		—
2000	2,003		−33.4%
2010	2,209		10.3%
2020	2,273		2.9%
U.S. Decennial Census; 1950 1960 1970 1980; 1990 2000 2010

Mathews first appeared as a census designated place the 1990 U.S. census.

Mathews racial composition as of 2020
Race	Number	Percentage
White (non-Hispanic)	2,042	89.84%
Black or African American (non-Hispanic)	46	2.02%
Native American	39	1.72%
Asian	9	0.4%
Other/Mixed	49	2.16%
Hispanic or Latino	88	3.87%

As of the 2020 United States census, there were 2,273 people, 1,067 households, and 637 families residing in the CDP.

== Government and infrastructure ==
The Lafourche Parish Mathews Government Complex is in Mathews.

The U.S. Postal Service operates the Mathews Post Office in Mathews.

== Education ==
Mathews is within the Lafourche Parish School District.

Residents east of Highway 308, south of 4839 Highway 308 (Matthews Baptist Church) and residents west of Highway 1, south of 4901 Highway 1 are zoned to Lockport Lower Elementary School, Lockport Upper Elementary School, and Lockport Middle School in Lockport. Other residents are zoned to Raceland Lower Elementary School, Raceland Upper Elementary School, and Raceland Middle School in Raceland. Central Lafourche High School is in the town.

Lafourche Parish is in the service area of Fletcher Technical Community College. Additionally, a Delgado Community College document stated that Lafourche Parish was in the college's service area.
