= Vin Bruce =

American Cajun musician (1932–2018)

- Born: Ervin Bruce; April 25, 1932; Cut Off, Louisiana, U.S.
- Died: June 8, 2018 (aged 86)
- Genres: Cajun music

Ervin "Vin" Bruce (April 25, 1932 – June 8, 2018) was an American musician who was one of the first Cajun musicians to appear on the Louisiana Hayride and Grand Ole Opry.

== Biography ==
Bruce was born in Cut Off, Louisiana. His father, Levy Bruce, worked as a trapper and fisherman, and played fiddle at local Cajun dances, usually held in someone's front room. Being from a musical family, Vin's interest in Cajun music grew and at the early age of 10 he learned how to play the guitar on his own. He also learned to sing.

== Career ==
Bruce began his musical career playing guitar with the Southern Serenaders and the Hillbilly Swing Kings.

On October 22, 1951, Bruce signed a recording contract with Columbia Records in Nashville, Tennessee, and recorded all-time popular Cajun songs such as "Dans La Louisiane" (1952), "Fille de la Ville," and "Clair de la Lune," recording with Chet Atkins, Grady Martin, Tommy Jackson, Owen Bradley and Shook Jackson. Bruce was one of the first Cajuns to perform on the stage of the Grand Ole Opry and the Louisiana Hayride.

In the mid-1950s, Bruce's career took a downturn as rock and roll became popular. Columbia released his contract, and Bruce returned to Louisiana and raised cattle. In 1961 he signed a contract with Swallow Records, and had a hit single with Jole Blon.

For his contribution and performance in Cajun music, Bruce is known as "the King of Cajun Singers" and has been inducted into the Nashville Music Hall of Fame, the CFMA Cajun Music Hall of Fame, and the Westbank Musicians Hall of Fame. He was also chosen as the Lafourche Parish Citizen of the Year.

== Discography ==
- 1953 My mama said I'd stay single
- 1961 Jole Blon
- 1979 Greatest Hits
- 1979 Cajun Country
- 2000 Essential Collection
- 2000 Carousel for Two
- 2006 Cajun Legend!
