= Alzina Toups =

American chef (1927–2022)

Alzina Toups (August 16, 1927 – May 2, 2022) was a chef based in Galliano, Louisiana who specialized in Cajun cooking. Her restaurant was visited by Andrew Zimmern, Governor John Bel Edwards, and other notable figures.

== Early life ==
Toups, a descendant of Nova Scotian fur trappers, was raised in the bayou. Born into a family of cooks, she was taught how to debone a chicken and make bousillage, a building material made from mud and Spanish moss, at an early age. Toups was a fluent speaker of Louisiana French.

== Restaurant ==
In 1977, Toups opened a kitchen inside a tin building owned by her son—a former welding shop. Her intention was to cook for her church, St. Joseph Catholic Church. The lettering, Alzina's, installed by her son, has fallen off, so the kitchen appears to an unadorned building from the street. The kitchen is not open to the public. There are no walk-ins, electronic reservations, or menus. Guests must place a booking by phone as far as a year in advance.

Only one private party is allowed in the restaurant per evening, usually between ten and thirty guests. The cooking area is open to the dining area, and guests are expected to help plate and serve. In addition to using cast iron skillets and pots, Toups cooks with wooden utensils and simple appliances.

== Awards ==
In 2013, Southern Foodways Alliance presented Toups with the Ruth Fertel Keeper of the Flame Award.
