= Central Lafourche High School =

Location
- 4820 Louisiana Highway 1 Mathews, Lafourche, Louisiana 70375; United States; 29°41′02″N 90°33′02″W

Information
- School type: Public high school
- Established: 1965
- School district: Lafourche Parish Public Schools
- Principal: Zack Hill
- Teaching staff: 67.40 (FTE)
- Grades: 9 through 12
- Enrollment: 1,329 (2023–2024)
- Student to teacher ratio: 19.72
- Colors: Green and gold
- Fight song: "Fight On"
- Mascot: Trojan
- Nickname: Trojans
- Rival: Hahnville Tigers; South Lafourche Tarpons; Thibodaux Tigers
- Yearbook: ILIAD
- Website: clhs.mylpsd.com

Central Lafourche High School (CLHS) is a public high school serving students in grades 9 through 12 in Mathews, unincorporated Lafourche Parish, Louisiana, United States, about 45 miles (72 km) southwest of New Orleans. The school, which has a Raceland postal address, is one of three high schools in the Lafourche Parish Public Schools district.

It serves the communities of: Mathews, Raceland, Lockport, Lockport Heights, Bayou Blue, and Gheens as well as the Lafourche Parish section of Des Allemands.

== History ==
The school is a consolidation of the former Raceland High School and Lockport High School. It was established by the Lafourche Parish School Board in 1965 as a three-year, co-educational senior high school. It was built at a cost of almost $4,000,000. The school became a reality with the 1966-1967 school session. Until the building was completed, the school was housed in temporary facilities on the campus of the former Lockport High School. The ninth grade and Pre G.E.D./Skills Option Programs were added to the Central Lafourche Curriculum in the 2001-2002 school year.

In 1968 the high school for black students, C.M. Washington High School, was dissolved due to racial integration. Therefore black students now attended the previously all-white school.

Between 2015 and 2016, according to the Louisiana State Department of Education rankings, this school's rank increased from a "B" to an "A".

== Athletics ==
Central Lafourche High athletics competes in the LHSAA.

The school competes interscholastically in several sports, including:

- The Trojan Lancer Marching Band
- Dance Team (Trojanettes)
- Football
- Baseball
- Basketball
- Bowling
- Varsity cheer
- Junior varsity cheer
- Cross country
- Fishing
- Golf
- Soccer
- Softball
- Swimming
- Tennis
- Track and field
- Volleyball

== Notable alumni ==
- Tommy Hodson - LSU and NFL quarterback; four-time All SEC Team
- Andrew Simoncelli - Nicholls State University associate professor; WWL-TV producer
- Larry Wilson - Nicholls State basketball player and NBA draft pick
