= Lafourche Parish, Louisiana =

Parish in Louisiana, United States

Lafourche Parish
- Parish
- Parish of Lafourche; Paroisse de la Fourche (French)
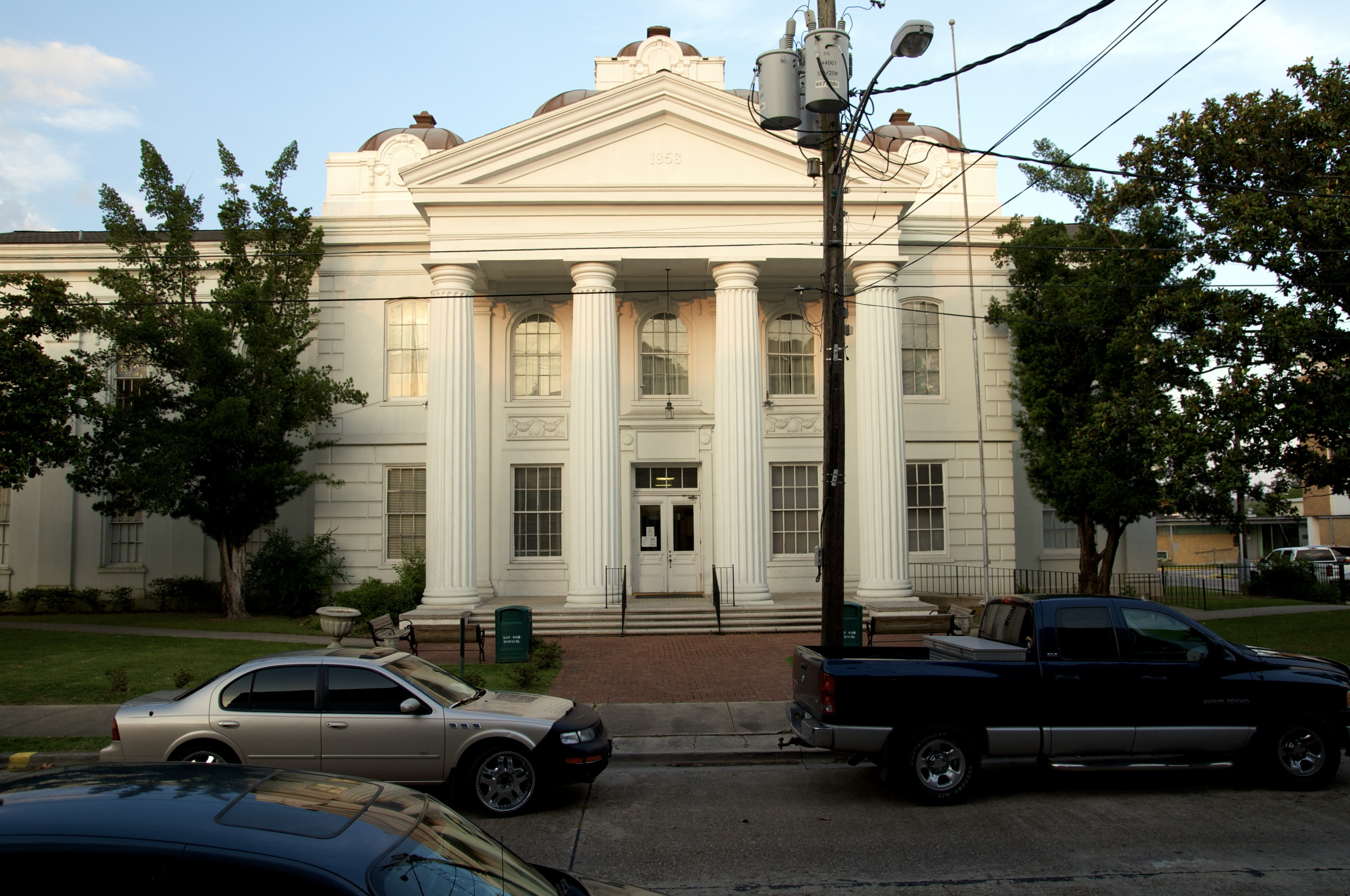
- Lafourche Parish Courthouse

- Seal Logo

- Location within the U.S. state of Louisiana
- Coordinates: 29°29′N 90°24′W
- Country: United States
- State: Louisiana
- Founded: 1807
- Named for: la fourche, French for the fork
- Seat: Thibodaux
- Largest city: Thibodaux

Area
  - Total: 1,474 sq mi (3,820 km^{2})
  - Land: 1,068 sq mi (2,770 km^{2})
  - Water: 406 sq mi (1,050 km^{2}) 28%

Population (2020)
  - Total: 97,557
  - Estimate (2025): 95,505 ▼
  - Density: 91.35/sq mi (35.27/km^{2})
- Time zone: UTC−6 (Central)
  - Summer (DST): UTC−5 (CDT)
- Congressional districts: 1st, 6th
- Website: www.lafourchegov.org

Lafourche Parish (French: Paroisse de la Fourche) is a parish located in the south of the U.S. state of Louisiana. The parish seat is Thibodaux. The parish was formed in 1807. It was originally the northern part of Lafourche Interior Parish, which consisted of the present parishes of Lafourche and Terrebonne. Lafourche Parish was named after the Bayou Lafourche. City buildings have been featured in television and movies, such as in Fletch Lives, due to its architecture and rich history. At the 2020 census, its population was 97,557.

Long a center of sugar cane plantations and sugar production, in November 1887 the parish was the site of the Thibodaux Massacre. After state militia were used to suppress a massive Knights of Labor strike involving 10,000 workers in four parishes, many African Americans retreated to Thibodaux. Local paramilitary forces attacked the men and their families, killing an estimated 50 persons. Hundreds more were missing, wounded, and presumed dead in one of the deadliest incidents of labor suppression and racial terrorism.

Lafourche Parish is part of the Houma-Thibodaux metropolitan statistical area. People of the state-recognized Native American Houma Tribe live in both Lafourche and Terrebonne parishes.

== History ==
South Louisiana became known as “Sugarland”, and Lafourche one of the sugar parishes, where sugar cane plantations were established before and after the Civil War. They required the labor of large numbers of enslaved African Americans. In the postbellum era, they constituted from 50 to 80 percent of the population in most of the sugar parishes.

Particularly after Reconstruction, whites in the parish used violence and intimidation against the large population of freedmen to suppress Republican voting and re-establish white supremacy, but were less successful than in North Louisiana until after disenfranchisement of blacks at the turn of the century. From 1877 through the early 20th century, there were 52 lynchings of African Americans in Lafourche Parish. Most of the deaths were due to white suppression of labor unrest in 1887; blacks were skilled sugar workers and had begun to organize for better wages and conditions. Some 10,000 workers had struck in Lafourche and three other parishes during the critical harvest period. At the request of the planters, the state sent in militia against the workers to break the strike.

In what was called the Thibodaux Massacre of November 22, 1887, local whites organized by leaders of the town killed up to 50 blacks who had taken refuge in the African-American quarters after a major Knights of Labor strike was called on sugar plantations. Hundreds more were wounded or missing, and presumed dead.

The total deaths in this parish due to this racial terrorism were the highest of any parish in the state and nearly twice as high as some others among the six parishes with the highest totals. In general, most of the lynching and racial terrorism took place in the late 19th and early 20th centuries.

On August 29, 2021, Hurricane Ida made landfall in Port Fourchon at 16:55 UTC as a category 4 hurricane with maximum sustained winds of 150 mph. Additional reports surveyed by ships in Port Fourchon reported wind gusts up to 194 knots. In Golden Meadow, LA, the National Weather Service recorded storm surge measurements of 10.1 ft. It was the strongest storm on record to make landfall in Lafourche Parish and at the time the 5th costliest hurricane in United States history.

== Geography ==
According to the U.S. Census Bureau, the parish has a total area of 1,474 square miles (3,820 km^{2}), of which 1,068 square miles (2,770 km^{2}) is land and 406 square miles (1,050 km^{2}) (28%) is water. To the south of the parish is the Gulf of Mexico.

Lafourche, like most of the Gulf Coast, is experiencing land loss due to man-made changes to the path of the Mississippi River and development in the swamplands. The southern part of the parish was inundated during Hurricane Juan in 1985. After that, the South Lafourche levee district converted its disconnected patchwork of low hurricane levees into a continuous wall that is 48 miles (77 km) long. The levee, largely funded by a local tax and occasional money from the Louisiana Coastal Protection and Restoration Authority, was built higher but narrower than recommended by the United States Army Corps of Engineers, which decertified them. The additional height proved its value when Hurricane Ida struck the area in 2021, and the floodwaters rose four feet (1.2 m) higher than the recommended height – but one foot (30 cm) lower than the levee was built. In the northern part of the parish, the shorter, federally approved levees were overtopped and the communities were flooded.

=== Major highways ===
- Interstate 49 (future)
- U.S. Highway 90
- Louisiana Highway 1
- Louisiana Highway 20
- Louisiana Highway 24
- Louisiana Highway 182
- Louisiana Highway 304
- Louisiana Highway 307
- Louisiana Highway 308
- Louisiana Highway 309
- Louisiana Highway 310
- Louisiana Highway 316
- Louisiana Highway 631
- Louisiana Highway 648
- Louisiana Highway 649
- Louisiana Highway 652
- Louisiana Highway 653
- Louisiana Highway 654
- Louisiana Highway 655
- Louisiana Highway 657
- Louisiana Highway 3087
- Louisiana Highway 3090
- Louisiana Highway 3161
- Louisiana Highway 3162
- Louisiana Highway 3185
- Louisiana Highway 3220
- Louisiana Highway 3235
- Louisiana Highway 3266

=== Adjacent parishes ===
- St. James Parish (north)
- St. John the Baptist Parish (north)
- St. Charles Parish (northeast)
- Jefferson Parish (east)
- Terrebonne Parish (west)
- Assumption Parish (northwest)

=== National protected area ===
- Jean Lafitte National Historical Park and Preserve (part, in Thibodaux)

=== Communities ===
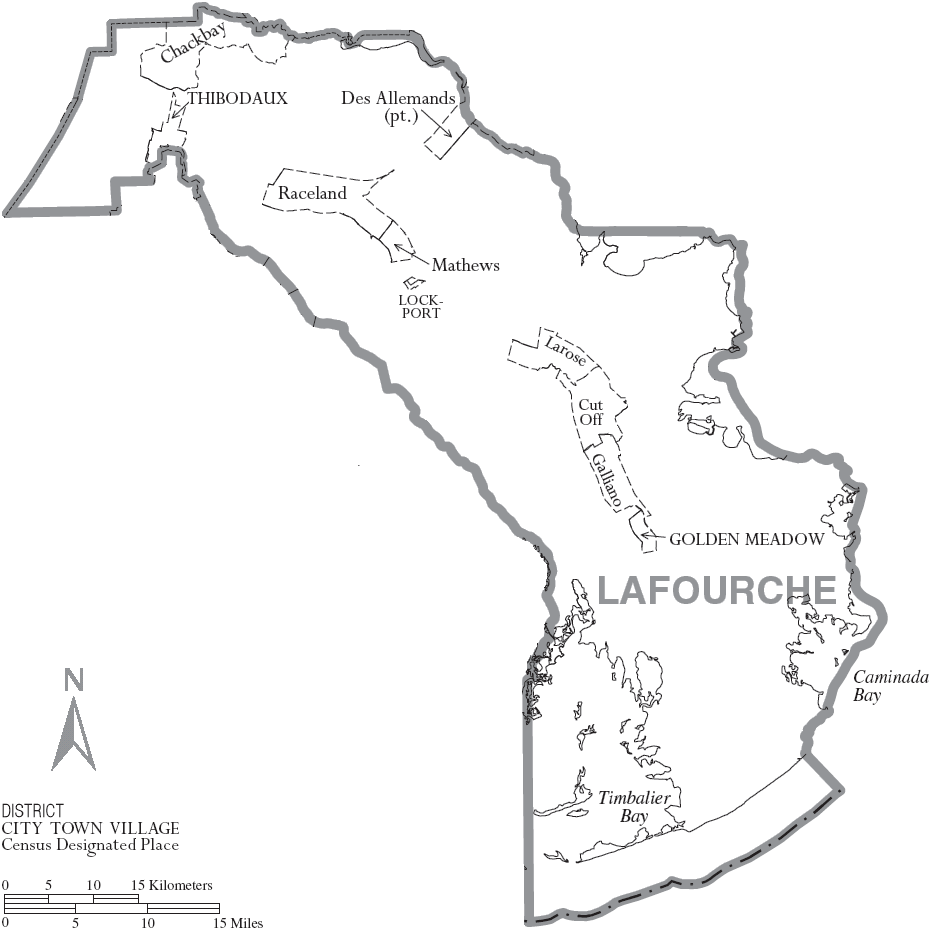
Map of Lafourche Parish with municipal labels

==== City ====
- Thibodaux (parish seat)

==== Towns ====
- Golden Meadow
- Lockport

==== Census-designated places ====
- Bayou Blue
- Bayou Country Club
- Chackbay
- Choctaw
- Cut Off
- Des Allemands
- Galliano
- Kraemer
- Lafourche Crossing
- Larose
- Lockport Heights
- Mathews
- Raceland

==== Other areas ====
- Gheens
- Leeville
- Port Fourchon

== Demographics ==
Historical population
Census	Pop.	Note	%±
1810	1,995		—
1820	3,755		88.2%
1830	5,503		46.6%
1840	7,303		32.7%
1850	9,532		30.5%
1860	14,044		47.3%
1870	14,719		4.8%
1880	19,113		29.9%
1890	22,095		15.6%
1900	28,882		30.7%
1910	33,111		14.6%
1920	30,344		−8.4%
1930	32,419		6.8%
1940	38,615		19.1%
1950	42,209		9.3%
1960	55,381		31.2%
1970	68,941		24.5%
1980	82,483		19.6%
1990	85,860		4.1%
2000	89,974		4.8%
2010	96,318		7.1%
2020	97,557		1.3%
2025 (est.)	95,505	▼	−2.1%
U.S. Decennial Census; 1790-1960 1900-1990; 1990-2000 2010-2013

LaFourche Parish, Louisiana – Racial and ethnic composition Note: the US Census treats Hispanic/Latino as an ethnic category. This table excludes Latinos from the racial categories and assigns them to a separate category. Hispanics/Latinos may be of any race.
Race / Ethnicity (NH = Non-Hispanic)	Pop 1980	Pop 1990	Pop 2000	Pop 2010	Pop 2020	% 1980	% 1990	% 2000	% 2010	% 2020
White alone (NH)	70,642	71,402	73,937	75,080	70,722	85.64%	83.16%	82.18%	77.95%	72.49%
Black or African American alone (NH)	9,005	10,667	11,287	12,679	14,532	10.92%	12.42%	12.54%	13.16%	14.90%
Native American or Alaska Native alone (NH)	831	1,866	2,020	2,623	2,427	1.01%	2.17%	2.25%	2.72%	2.49%
Asian alone (NH)	319	642	596	707	759	0.39%	0.75%	0.66%	0.73%	0.78%
Native Hawaiian or Pacific Islander alone (NH)	x	x	16	26	31	x	x	0.02%	0.03%	0.03%
Other race alone (NH)	42	34	44	62	160	0.05%	0.04%	0.05%	0.06%	0.16%
Mixed race or Multiracial (NH)	x	x	790	1,494	3,254	x	x	0.88%	1.55%	3.34%
Hispanic or Latino (any race)	1,644	1,249	1,284	3,647	5,672	1.99%	1.45%	1.43%	3.79%	5.81%
Total	82,483	85,860	89,974	96,318	97,557	100.00%	100.00%	100.00%	100.00%	100.00%

As of the 2020 United States census, there were 97,557 people, 36,759 households, and 25,224 families residing in the parish. The average household size was 2.60 and the average family size was 3.04.

In 2000, there were 89,794 people living in the parish. The racial makeup of Lafourche was 82.85% White, 12.61% Black or African American, 2.30% American Indian and Alaska Native, 0.67% Asian, 0.02% Pacific Islander, 0.58% from other races, and 0.97% from two or more races; 1.43% of the population were Hispanic or Latino American of any race. Among the population, 19.12% reported speaking French or Cajun French at home, while 1.51% spoke Spanish.

Up from $34,910 in 2000, the median income of a household in the parish was $51,339 according to the 2019 American Community Survey. In 2000, males had a median income of $34,600 versus $19,484 for females. The per capita income for the parish was $15,809. About 13.20% of families and 16.50% of the population were below the poverty line, including 21.90% of those under age 18 and 18.30% of those age 65 or over.

== Education ==
The parish is zoned to Lafourche Parish Public Schools.

Residents of select portions of Lafourche Parish (particularly in parts of Grand Bois and Bourg) may attend schools in the Terrebonne Parish School District.

=== High schools ===
- Central Lafourche in Mathews
- South Lafourche in Galliano
- Thibodaux High in Thibodaux
- Edward Douglas White Catholic High School in Thibodaux

=== Colleges and universities ===
- Nicholls State University in Thibodaux

The parish is in the service area of Fletcher Technical Community College. Additionally, a Delgado Community College document stated that Lafourche Parish was in the college's service area.

== National Guard ==
D Company 2-156 Infantry Battalion of the 256TH Infantry Brigade Combat Team resides in Thibodaux, Louisiana

== Notable people ==
- Edward Douglass White, Associate Justice (1894-1910) and Chief Justice (1910-1921) of the United States Supreme Court
- Jefferson J. DeBlanc (1921-2007), United States Marine Corps fighter pilot and flying ace; received the Medal of Honor for actions during World War II
- Dick Guidry (1929-2014), member of Louisiana House of Representatives from 1950 to 1954 and 1964–76. Considered the youngest person ever elected to the Louisiana House.
- Bobby Hebert, former NFL quarterback
- Harvey Peltier, Jr.
- Harvey Peltier, Sr.
- Glen Pitre
- Loulan Pitre, Jr.
- Ed Orgeron, head football coach at LSU, Ole Miss, USC; NFL assistant coach

== Politics ==
United States presidential election results for Lafourche Parish, Louisiana
Year	Republican		Democratic		Third party(ies)	
Year	No.	%	No.	%	No.	%
1912	315	26.90%	667	56.96%	189	16.14%
1916	157	8.11%	629	32.51%	1,149	59.38%
1920	1,044	75.60%	337	24.40%	0	0.00%
1924	611	47.40%	678	52.60%	0	0.00%
1928	243	10.86%	1,994	89.14%	0	0.00%
1932	364	12.18%	2,623	87.78%	1	0.03%
1936	1,630	42.59%	2,195	57.36%	2	0.05%
1940	1,065	23.17%	3,531	76.83%	0	0.00%
1944	875	14.94%	4,980	85.06%	0	0.00%
1948	1,247	21.09%	1,586	26.82%	3,080	52.09%
1952	3,739	40.93%	5,396	59.07%	0	0.00%
1956	5,741	60.25%	3,466	36.38%	321	3.37%
1960	2,930	18.25%	12,244	76.26%	881	5.49%
1964	6,164	33.85%	12,045	66.15%	0	0.00%
1968	4,797	22.60%	5,516	25.99%	10,910	51.41%
1972	13,936	67.20%	5,713	27.55%	1,088	5.25%
1976	11,434	43.53%	14,131	53.80%	701	2.67%
1980	14,951	48.51%	14,222	46.15%	1,645	5.34%
1984	20,930	65.40%	10,186	31.83%	889	2.78%
1988	16,152	50.19%	15,013	46.65%	1,014	3.15%
1992	12,744	35.75%	16,182	45.40%	6,719	18.85%
1996	12,105	34.99%	18,810	54.37%	3,681	10.64%
2000	18,575	53.92%	14,627	42.46%	1,247	3.62%
2004	22,734	60.04%	14,417	38.08%	713	1.88%
2008	27,089	71.49%	9,662	25.50%	1,142	3.01%
2012	28,592	73.17%	9,623	24.63%	860	2.20%
2016	31,959	76.74%	8,423	20.23%	1,263	3.03%
2020	36,024	79.37%	8,672	19.11%	692	1.52%
2024	34,461	80.43%	7,864	18.35%	520	1.21%

== See also ==
- National Register of Historic Places listings in Lafourche Parish, Louisiana
- Louisiana Highway 1 Bridge
