= Golden Meadow High School =

- U.S. National Register of Historic Places
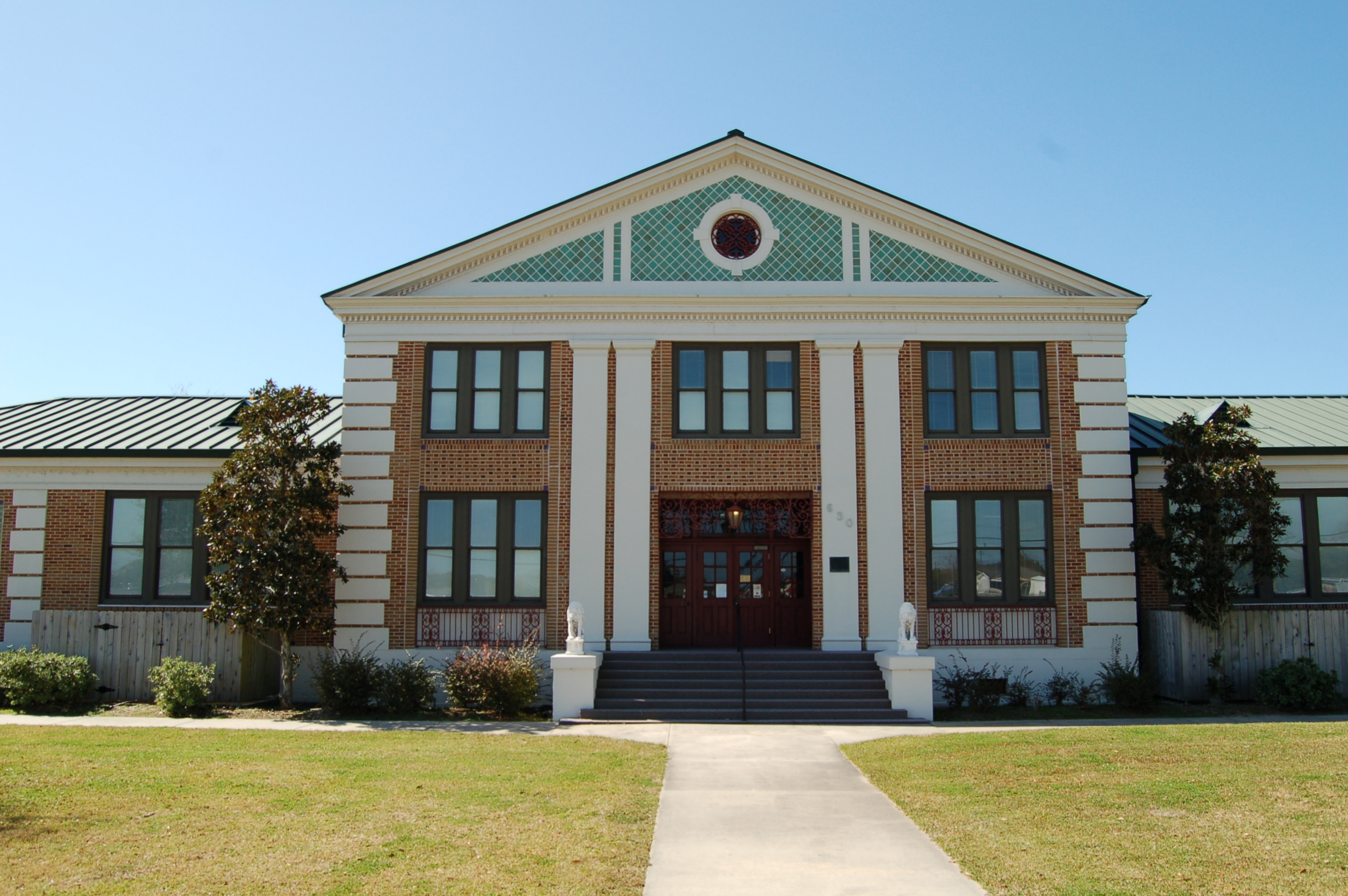

- Location within Louisiana Location within the United States
- Location: 630 South Bayou Drive, Golden Meadow, Louisiana
- Coordinates: 29°23′19″N 90°15′53″W
- Area: 2 acres (0.81 ha)
- Built: 1931
- Architect: Favrot and Livaudais
- Architectural style: Classical Revival
- NRHP reference No.: 98001426
- Added to NRHP: November 23, 1998

The Golden Meadow High School, also known as Golden Meadow Junior High School and now Golden Meadow Middle School, is a historic school building located at 630 South Bayou Drive in Golden Meadow, Louisiana.

Designed by New Orleans architects Favrot and Livaudais, the Classical Revival brick building was erected in 1931. It features a two-story central block with one-story wings on each side. Grades one through ten were taught until 1933, when the school obtained high school accreditation. The school gave opportunities for sports almost as soon as it opened, and a band was organized in 1939. Golden Meadow High stopped operations in 1966 since it consolidated with Larose-Cut Off High School to form South Lafourche High School in Galliano. The building is currently Golden Meadow Middle School.

The building was added to the National Register of Historic Places on November 23, 1998.

== See also ==
- National Register of Historic Places listings in Lafourche Parish, Louisiana
