= C.M. Washington High School =

Segregated school in Louisiana, United States

Coordinates: 29.7806°N 90.8159°W

Cordelia Matthews Washington High School (c. 1942 – 1968) was a primary and secondary school for black students in Thibodaux, Louisiana, United States. A part of Lafourche Parish Public Schools, it was the only K-12 school in Lafourche Parish for black people, and it had the first high school program for black people in Thibodaux.

== History ==
Cordelia Matthews Washington established the Negro Corporation School in the early 1900s. She died in 1937, and Washington High School was renamed in her honor circa 1942. The final school building received its dedication on December 8, 1950. It served grades 1–12. Leola A. Washington was the initial principal of the school's elementary division and Professor Robert M. Harris was the initial principal of the high school division.

In 1968 the school building was re-purposed as South Thibodaux Elementary School due to racial integration. Black students moved to previously all-white high schools: Thibodaux High School, Central Lafourche High School, and South Lafourche High School.

In 2008 members of the C.M. Washington alumni association proposed renaming South Thibodaux Elementary after Cordelia Matthews Washington. Allen Chapel AME Church pastor Rev. Nelson Dan Taylor Sr., also proposed this renaming in 2013.
