= Thibodaux High School =

Location
- 1355 Tiger Drive; Thibodaux, Louisiana 70301; United States; 29°46′41″N 90°50′22″W

Information
- School type: Public high school
- Motto: One Among Many
- School district: Lafourche Parish Public Schools
- Superintendent: Jarod Martin
- Principal: Rebecca Hebert
- Teaching staff: 72.75 (FTE)
- Grades: 9–12
- Enrollment: 1,427 (2023–2024)
- Student to teacher ratio: 19.62
- Colors: Purple & Gold
- Mascot: Tibby and Deaux, the Tigers
- Nickname: Tigers
- Rivals: Central Lafourche Trojans; South Lafourche Tarpons; Terrebonne Tigers
- Yearbook: ROAR
- Website: https://ths.mylpsd.com/

Thibodaux High School (THS) is a public high school serving students in grades 9–12 in Thibodaux, Louisiana, United States about 75 miles (121 km) southwest of New Orleans. It is one of three high schools in the Lafourche Parish Public Schools.

It serves: Thibodaux, Ward 6 (including Chackbay and Choctaw), and Kraemer (a.k.a. Bayou Boeuf).

== History ==
The school was founded circa 1908 at the site of what is now Thibodaux Elementary School. One of its first principals was L. L. Broussard. Later the school was moved a block away to the current site of Thibodaux Middle School. In 1967, the student body was moved to its current location at the corner of Talbot Avenue and Tiger Drive.

In 1968, the high school for black students, C.M. Washington High School, was dissolved due to racial integration. Therefore black students now attended the previously all-white school.

In 2002, ninth grade students were added to the campus.

== Athletics ==
Thibodaux High athletics competes in the LHSAA.

The school competes in several sports, including:

- Band
- Baseball
- Basketball
- Cheerleading
- Cross Country
- Dance Team (Tigerettes)
- Fishing
- Football
- Golf
- Quiz Bowl
- Soccer
- Softball
- Swimming
- Tennis
- Track and Field
- Volleyball

=== Championships ===
Football Championships

- (1) State Championship: 1991

Thibodaux High won the class 5A football state championship in 1991 against Neville High School. The team under head coach Dennis Lorio won 18–15 in overtime becoming the first football team to win a class 5A football championship in LHSAA history.

Boys' basketball Championships

- (1) State Championship: 2019

Thibodaux High boys' basketball team won the 5A state championship in 2019 against Walker High School.

South Louisiana Quiz Bowl Championships

- (1) State Championship: 2020

Thibodaux High Quiz Bowl won the 2020 South Louisiana Quiz Bowl Championship

== Notable alumni ==
- Eric Andolsek, offensive lineman for LSU Tigers and the NFL's Detroit Lions
- Kody Chamberlain, a comic book creator
- Mark Davis, Former NBA small forward 2nd round of 1995 pick #48 Minnesota Timberwolves
- John Weimer, Chief Justice Louisiana Supreme Court, 2021-, 1972 THS Graduate
- Damian Johnson, small forward for the Heatdevils (Japanese basketball).
- Kyren Lacy, former college football wide receiver for the LSU Tigers
- Jerome "Dee" Richard, 1973 alumnus, current member of the Louisiana House of Representatives from Lafourche Parish, one of only two Independents in the chamber
- Amik Robertson, NFL cornerback
- Greg Robinson, offensive lineman for the Cleveland Browns
- Tom Roussel, NFL linebacker
- Scott Sanders, Former MLB player (San Diego Padres, Detroit Tigers, Seattle Mariners, Chicago Cubs)
