= Lockport, Louisiana =

Town of Lockport
- Town
- Location of Lockport in Lafourche Parish, Louisiana.

- Location of Louisiana in the United States
- Coordinates: 29°38′33″N 90°32′24″W
- Country: United States
- State: Louisiana
- Parish: Lafourche

Government
  - Mayor: Barry Plaisance (R) (elected 2022)
  - Town Council: Members list: Division A: Gary Acosta; Division B: Ernest Boudreaux; Division C: Bobbie M. Galjour; Division D: Rodney Hartman; Division E: Tyler Detillier

Area
  - Total: 1.15 sq mi (2.98 km^{2})
  - Land: 1.13 sq mi (2.93 km^{2})
  - Water: 0.019 sq mi (0.05 km^{2})
- Elevation: 10 ft (3.0 m)

Population (2020)
  - Total: 2,490
  - Density: 2,198.2/sq mi (848.72/km^{2})
- Time zone: UTC-6 (CST)
  - Summer (DST): UTC-5 (CDT)
- ZIP Code: 70374
- Area code: 985
- FIPS code: 22-44900
- Website: http://www.townoflockport.com

Lockport is a town on Bayou Lafourche in Lafourche Parish, Louisiana, United States. The population was 2,490 in 2020. It is part of the Houma–Bayou Cane–Thibodaux metropolitan statistical area.

== History ==
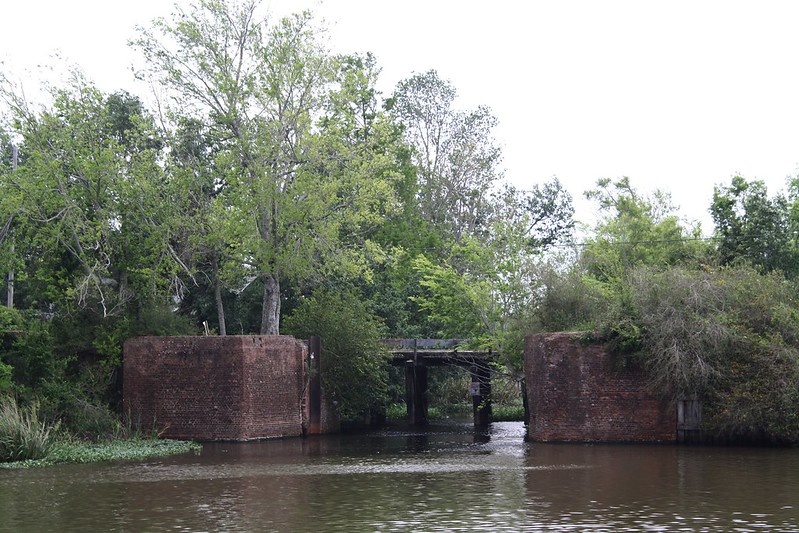
Locks in Lockport

Lockport, founded in 1835, traces its history to Jacques Lamotte, who in 1790 owned a large tract of land along Bayou Lafourche. Lemotte sold a portion of the tract to Messrs. Mercier and Marcantel in 1814. In 1823 William Field purchased a parcel of the land and later donated 5 arpents of it on both banks of Bayou Lafourche to Barataria and Lafourche Canal Company. As part of the transaction, the company agreed to build a canal, which would link Bayou Terrebonne to New Orleans. Allou D'Hemecourt surveyed the area in 1835. His map bears the name Longueville. Eventually, the village's name would become Lockport.

At first the canal, completed in 1847, brought prosperity to the area. Three years later locks were completed at the point where the canal reached Bayou Lafourche. Shipping along the canal was brisk until 1868. After that time, part of the waterway was no longer in use. The crevasse of 1876 partially destroyed the locks. Today remnants of the brick bulwark are still visible under a blanket of weeds.

Lockport prospered in spite of the canal's failure as a business venture. In 1849 the first public school opened. It was a one-room affair in Scanian's Cooperage. In 1850 Holy Savior Catholic Church was dedicated, and in 1879 an order of nuns established Holy Savior School.

The Village of Lockport was incorporated in 1899, and a mayor and board of aldermen were named. At the turn of the century, the village boasted a post office, brick sidewalks, an iron bridge over the bayou, a newspaper, ice house, banks, hotels, liveries, blacksmith shop, clothing stores, grocery and general merchandise stores, and various other enterprises. The iron bridge created quite a stir among the populace. It joined Lockport to Rita, the settlement on the east bank of the bayou.

One of the worst calamities to touch the village occurred in 1916, when a disastrous fire destroyed a large part of the business area and several homes. As a result of this tragedy, a water tower was erected on Main Street near the present day Sheriff's Annex, where it stood until Hurricane Betsy destroyed it in 1965. By 1948 Lockport's population had grown to the point where its status was changed from village to town. Its boundaries had been expanded, and later the site of the canal bridge was changed to fifth street, now Crescent Avenue. Highway 1 no longer ran along Main Street. Several businesses sprang up along the new route, and that area has become the business hub of the town. Today Lockport is a progressive community, dependent upon a diversified economy, surrounded by industries such as shipbuilding, sugarcane farming, oil and gas exploration, cattle, fishing, and a variety of vegetable farms. Through the years Lockport has managed to retain its small town quality - a quality that welcomes visitors who travel along Bayou Lafourche, the longest street in the world

== Geography ==
According to the United States Census Bureau, the town has a total area of 0.6 square miles (1.6 km^{2}), of which 0.6 square miles (1.6 km^{2}) is land and 0.04 square miles (0.10 km^{2}) (3.12%) is water.

== Demographics ==
Historical population
Census	Pop.	Note	%±
1880	171		—
1900	401		—
1910	669		66.8%
1920	803		20.0%
1930	866		7.8%
1940	877		1.3%
1950	1,388		58.3%
1960	2,221		60.0%
1970	2,398		8.0%
1980	2,424		1.1%
1990	2,503		3.3%
2000	2,624		4.8%
2010	2,578		−1.8%
2020	2,490		−3.4%
2025 (est.)	2,333	▼	−6.3%
U.S. Decennial Census

Lockport racial composition as of 2020
Race	Number	Percentage
White (non-Hispanic)	2,104	84.5%
Black or African American (non-Hispanic)	106	4.26%
Native American	23	0.92%
Asian	5	0.2%
Other/Mixed	127	5.1%
Hispanic or Latino	125	5.02%

As of the 2020 United States census, there were 2,490 people, 983 households, and 598 families residing in the town.

== Government and infrastructure ==
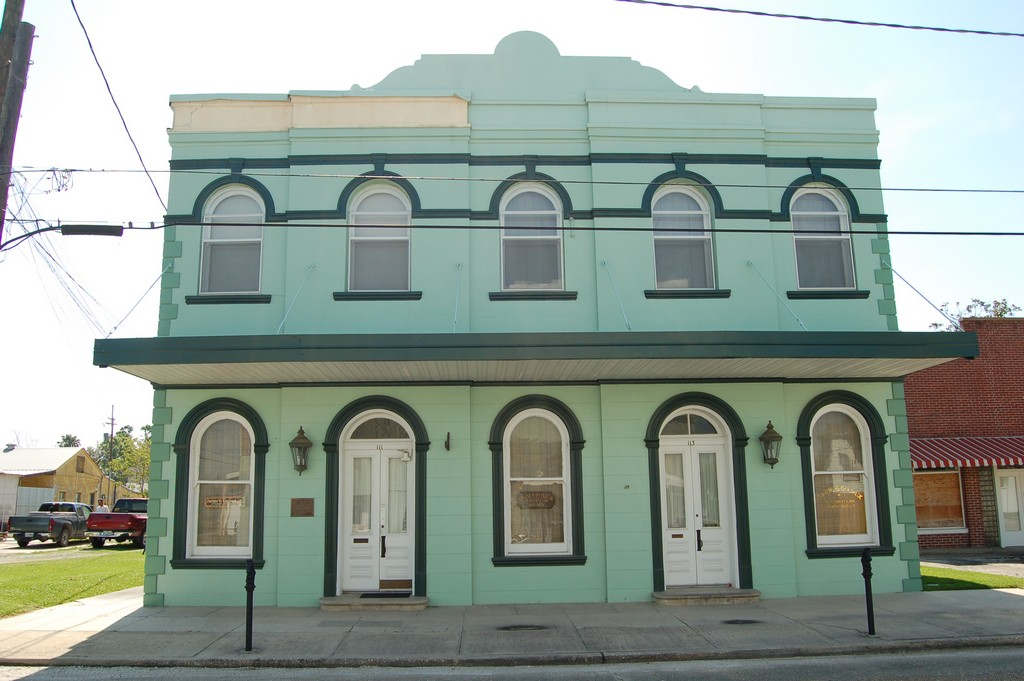
The Bank of Lockport is listed on the National Register of Historic Places.

The United States Postal Service operates the Lockport Post Office.

The town government operates in the Lockport Civic Complex (Town Hall) on Church Street.

== Education ==
Lafourche Parish Public Schools is the school district of the whole parish. It operates public schools, including:

- Lockport Lower Elementary School (K-2)
- Lockport Upper Elementary School (3-5)
- Lockport Middle School

Lockport is served by Central Lafourche High School in Mathews, formed by a 1966 merger of Lockport High School and Raceland High School.

Holy Savior Catholic School opened in 1879, established by an order of nuns.

A one-room schoolhouse established in 1849 at Scanian’s Cooperage was the first school in Lockport.

The 501(C)(3) Camille and Braxton Hebert Memorial Fund Inc. was used to establish recreational areas/playgrounds at both elementary schools. The fund was named after the brother and sister Camille and Braxton Hebert, who were murdered by their mother, Amy Hebert, on August 20, 2007. The playground at Lockport Lower has the text "Braxton's Buddies". Camille's Court, at Lockport Upper, was scheduled to be a basketball court decorated with a plaque and flowerbed.

Lafourche Parish Library operates the Lockport Branch.

Fletcher Technical Community College has Lafourche Parish in the college's service area. The college maintains a facility in Lockport. Additionally, a Delgado Community College document stated that Lafourche Parish was in the college's service area.

== Notable people ==
- Jefferson J. DeBlanc, pilot who received the Medal of Honor for his actions in World War II
- Dick Guidry, former state representative from Lafourche Parish and former owner of drive-in theaters
