= South Lafourche High School =

Location
- 16911 East Main Street; Cut Off, Louisiana 70345; United States; 29°27′59″N 90°18′37″W

Information
- Type: Public Secondary
- Motto: Tant Que Je Peux ("All That I Can")
- Established: 1966
- School district: Lafourche Parish Public Schools
- Principal: Alison Chiasson
- Faculty: 59.91 (FTE)
- Grades: 9–12
- Enrollment: 1,056 (2023-2024)
- Student to teacher ratio: 17.63
- Colors: Blue and Silver
- Mascot: Tarpon
- Nickname: Big Blue
- Rival: Central Lafourche Trojans; Thibodaux Tigers; South Terrebonne Gators
- Newspaper: Silver King Times
- Website: SLHS

South Lafourche High School is a public secondary school in the Galliano census-designated place, an unincorporated area in Lafourche Parish, Louisiana, United States. It has a Cut Off postal address.

A part of Lafourche Parish Public Schools, South Lafourche High currently serves the coastal towns and communities of: Larose, Cut Off, Galliano, and Golden Meadow. It is the result of the 1966 consolidation of the former Golden Meadow and Larose-Cut Off High Schools. As a result, both former high schools were designated junior high schools and, in 2002, middle schools. South Lafourche High School was founded in 1966.

Originally South Lafourche only provided 10th to 12th grade. During the 2002–2003 school year the 9th grade was added and removed from the middle schools.

== History ==
In 1968 the high school for black students, C.M. Washington High School, was dissolved due to racial integration. Therefore, black students now attended the previously all-white school.

Between 2015 and 2016, according to the Louisiana State Department of Education rankings, this school's rank increased from a "B" to an "A".

In 2025, current student and local musician Sam Pugh released the album My Time in the Woods, continuing the school's history of student involvement in the local arts scene.

== Athletics ==
South Lafourche High athletics competes in the LHSAA.

South Lafourche High School sports include football, baseball, basketball, softball, soccer, swimming, tennis, track and field, cross country, golf, and volleyball.

=== State championships ===
Football
The South Lafourche football team won two state championships in 1971 and 1977.

Boys' basketball
The South Lafourche boys' basketball team won one Class 5A state championship in 1998 and was the 1999 Class 5A runner-up.

== Notable alumni ==
- Bobby Hebert, former New Orleans Saints and Atlanta Falcons quarterback.
- Ed Orgeron, former LSU Tigers football head coach.
- Joseph Orgeron, state representative
