= Dick Guidry =

American politician and businessman

Richard P. Guidry, known as Dick Guidry was an American politician and businessman, who served as a member of the Louisiana House of Representatives.

Preceded by Dudley A. Bernard; Woolen J. Falgout	Louisiana State Representative for Lafourche Parish; 1964—1976	Succeeded by L. G. LaPlante Jr.
