= Lafourche Parish Public Schools =

School district in Louisiana, United States

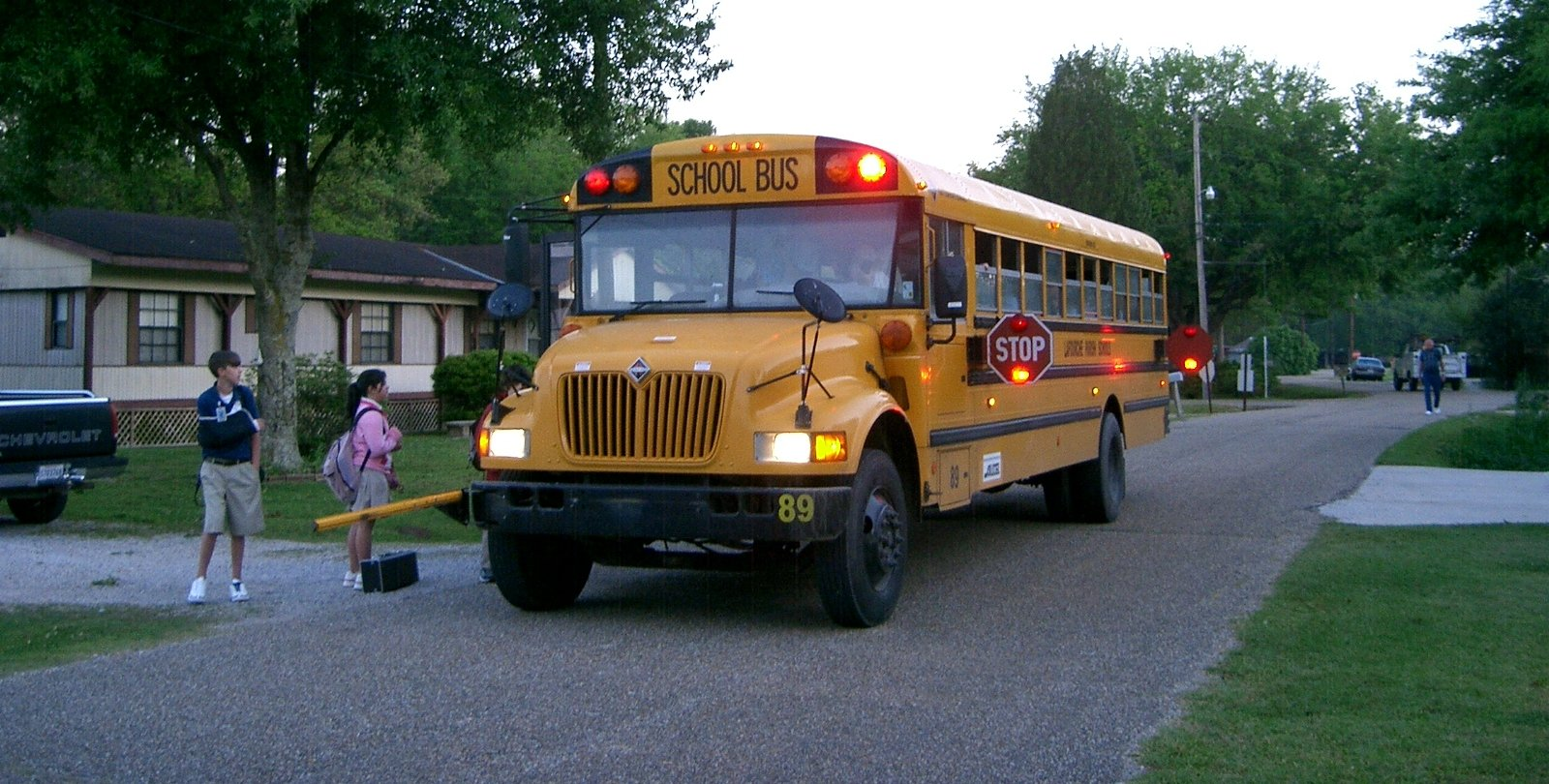
School bus of the district

Lafourche Parish Public Schools is a school district headquartered in Thibodaux, Louisiana.

The district serves all of Lafourche Parish, including a portion of Des Allemands.

Residents of select portions of Lafourche Parish (particularly in parts of Grand Bois and Bourg) may attend schools in the Terrebonne Parish School District. Students with certain medical problems and children of certain teachers residing in Terrebonne Parish may attend school in the Lafourche Parish Public Schools only if superintendents of both systems approve it on a case-by-case basis.

== History ==
The school district made academic improvement between 2015 and 2016; it received an "A" grade from the Louisiana Department of Education in 2016 since its score had risen to 102.2, crossing the 100 points needed for an "A" rank, from 95.8.

== School uniforms ==
Students are required to wear school uniforms.

== Schools ==
=== Secondary schools ===
High schools

- Central Lafourche High School (Mathews, Unincorporated area)
- South Lafourche High School (Galliano, Unincorporated area)
- Thibodaux High School (Thibodaux)

Middle schools

- Bayou Blue Middle School (Unincorporated area)
- East Thibodaux Middle School (Thibodaux)
- Golden Meadow Middle School (Golden Meadow)
- Larose-Cut Off Middle School (Larose, Unincorporated area)
- Lockport Middle School (Lockport)
- Raceland Middle School (Raceland, Unincorporated area)
- Sixth Ward Middle School (Unincorporated area)
- West Thibodaux Middle School (Thibodaux)

==== Elementary schools ====
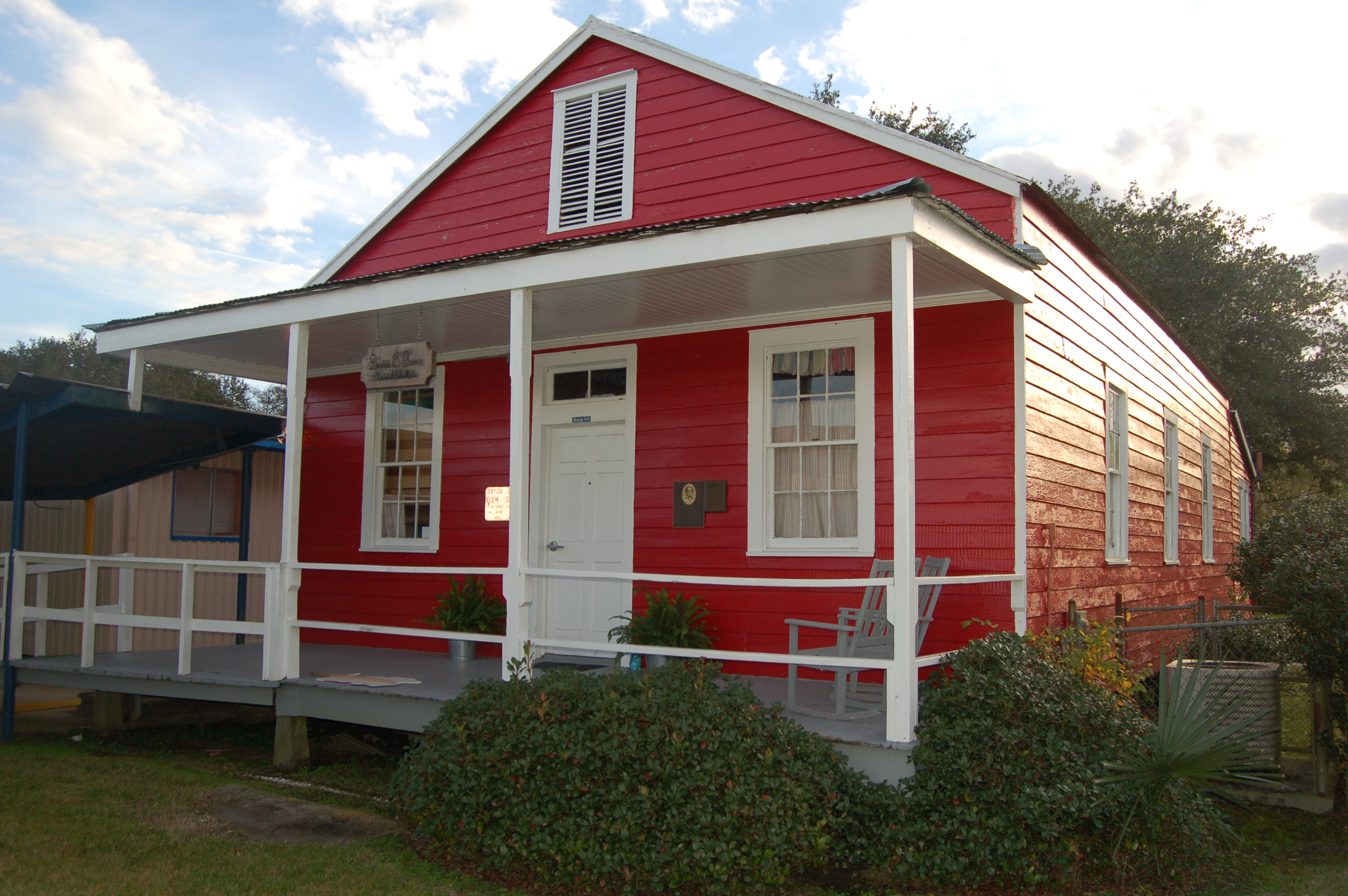
The original red schoolhouse of Bayou Boeuf Elementary School

- Bayou Blue Elementary School
- Bayou Boeuf Elementary School
- Chackbay Elementary School
  - As of 2011 the school had 485 students. As this was above the school's capacity, that year the district considered rezoning 125 students to Bayou Boeuf, which had experienced a decline in the number of students attending school there.
- Cut Off Elementary School
- Galliano Elementary School
- Golden Meadow Lower Elementary School
- Golden Meadow Upper Elementary School
- W. S. Lafargue Elementary School
- Lockport Lower Elementary School
- Lockport Upper Elementary School
- North Larose Elementary School
- Raceland Lower Elementary School
- Raceland Upper Elementary School
- South Larose Elementary School
- St. Charles Elementary School
- South Thibodaux Elementary School
- Thibodaux Elementary School

== Former schools ==
Consolidated in the 1960s:

- Golden Meadow High School
- Larose-Cut Off High School
- Lockport High School
- Raceland High School

Schools for black people:

- C.M. Washington Colored High School/C.M. Washington Colored Training School - Thibodaux
- Raceland Colored School

== Notable board members ==
Jerome "Dee" Richard, current member of the Louisiana House of Representatives from Lafourche Parish, one of only two Independents in the chamber, served two stints on the Lafourche Parish School Board, from 1982 to 1984 and again from 1986 to 1994.
