= Thibodaux, Louisiana =

- City
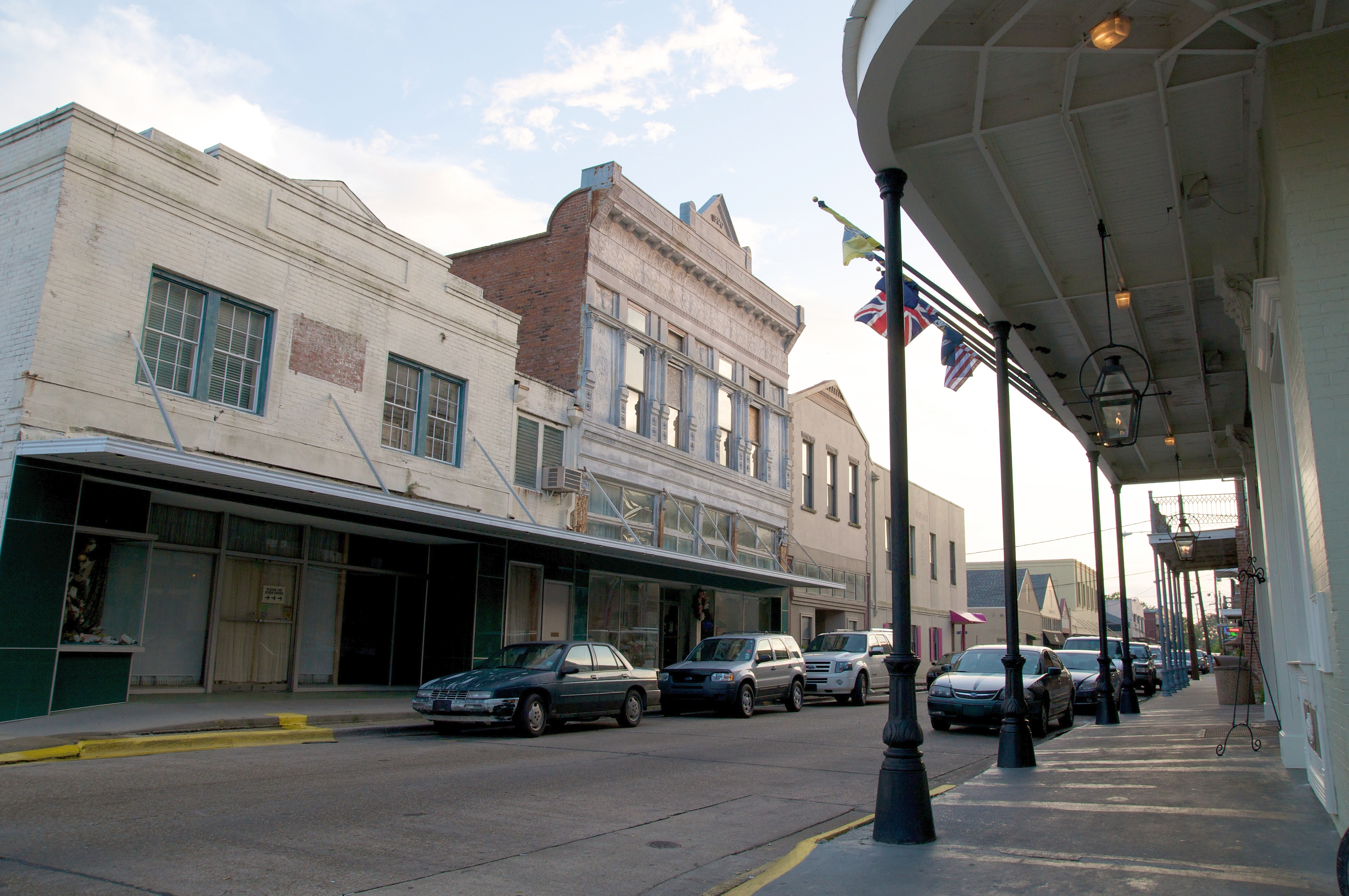
- Downtown
- Nickname: Queen City of Lafourche
- Location of Thibodaux in Lafourche Parish, Louisiana.

- Location in Louisiana Location in the United States
- Coordinates: 29°47′32″N 90°49′12″W
- Country: United States
- State: Louisiana
- Parish: Lafourche
- Incorporated: 1830
- Named after: Henry S. Thibodaux

Government
  - Mayor: Kevin Clement

Area
  - City: 6.79 sq mi (17.59 km^{2})
  - Land: 6.79 sq mi (17.59 km^{2})
  - Water: 0 sq mi (0.00 km^{2})
- Elevation: 13 ft (4.0 m)

Population (2020)
  - City: 15,948
  - Density: 2,348.0/sq mi (906.58/km^{2})
  - Metro: 208,178
- Time zone: UTC−6 (CST)
  - Summer (DST): UTC−5 (CDT)
- ZIP Codes: 70301–70302, 70310
- Area code: 985
- FIPS code: 22-75425
- Website: ci.thibodaux.la.us

Thibodaux (/ˈtɪbədoʊ/ TIB-ə-doh) is a city in and the parish seat of Lafourche Parish, Louisiana, United States, along the banks of Bayou Lafourche in the northwestern part of the parish. The population was 15,948 at the 2020 census. Thibodaux is a principal city of the Houma–Bayou Cane–Thibodaux metropolitan statistical area.

Thibodaux is nicknamed the "Queen City of Lafourche", and is home to Nicholls State University.

== History ==
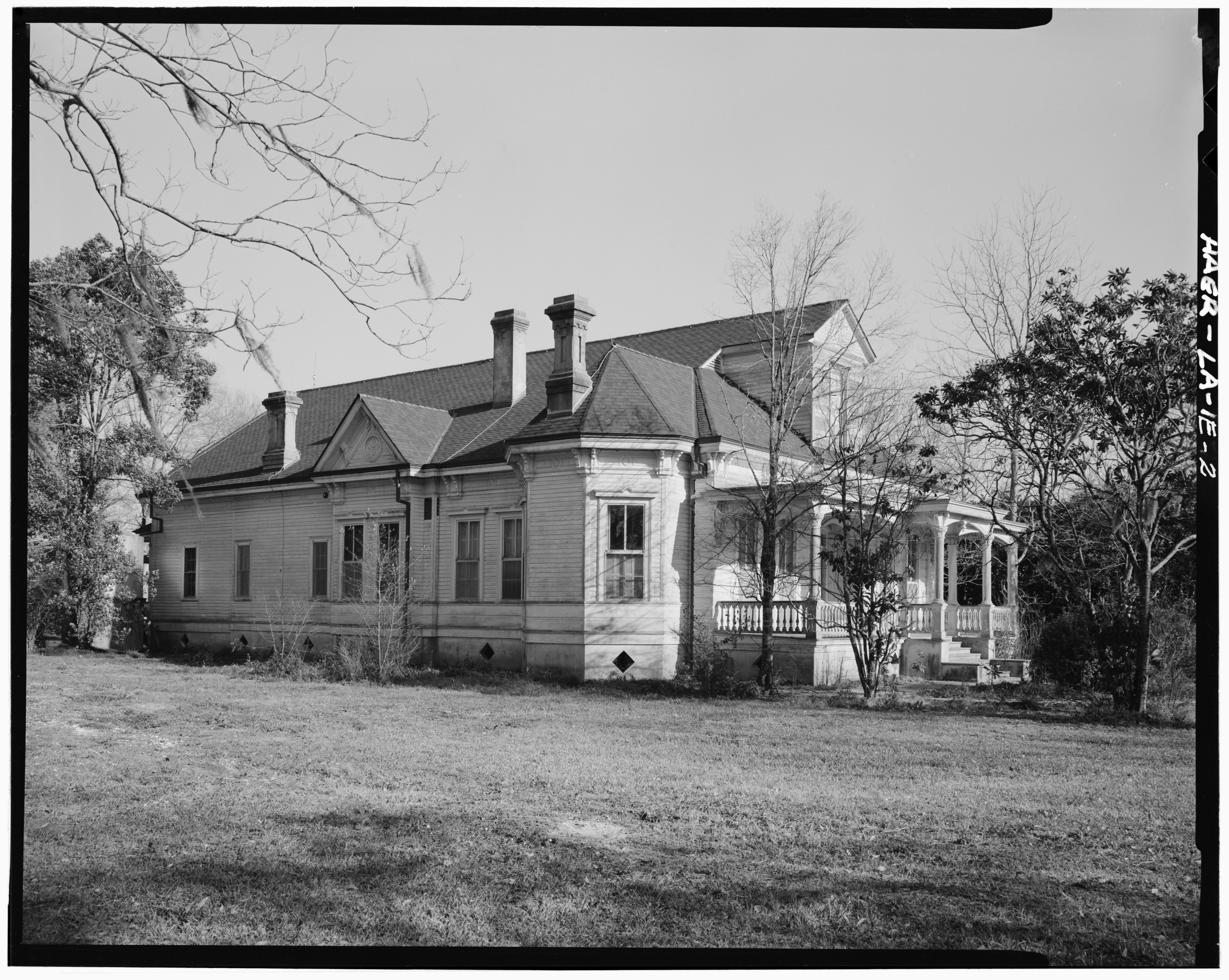
Laurel Valley Sugar Plantation "Big" House, south of Thibodaux.

The first documented Native American inhabitants of the Thibodaux area were the Chawasha, a small tribe related to the Chitimacha of the upper Bayou Lafourche. The first settlers of European descent in this area arrived in the 18th century, when Louisiana was the Spanish province of Luisiana. They consisted of French nationals and Louisiana-born French and German creoles, followed shortly by Spanish and French Acadian immigrants. The colonists gradually began to import Africans in bondage as slaves to work on and develop rice and sugar cane plantations.

The United States acquired Louisiana from France in 1803 as part of the Louisiana Purchase, after Napoleon, then First Consul, decided to sell France's North American possessions due to the failure to regain control of Saint-Domingue (which became the Republic of Haiti) and the impending threat of war with Great Britain. The present State of Louisiana became the U.S. Territory of Orleans, and in 1805 the Territorial Legislature created ten counties, among them the County of Lafourche (later Lafourche Parish). Americans from other states then began to settle in the area.

As early as 1808, a trading post and small village, known as "Thibodeauxville," had been established on the west bank of Bayou Lafourche, due to its strategic location near the confluence of Bayou Lafourche and Bayou Terrebonne. By the 1820s, the village had grown to a local center of the sugar cane industry. This settlement was formally incorporated as a town in 1830 under the name "Thibodauxville", in honor of local planter Henry Schuyler Thibodaux, the son of Acadian exiles. He had provided the land for the original village center and, as lieutenant governor, assumed the office of acting governor of the State of Louisiana in 1824. The area was developed in the antebellum period for sugar cane plantations, and Thibodaux was the trading center of the region. Sugar cane was an important commodity crop. The name of the town was shortened to "Thibodeaux" in 1838. The current spelling of the city's name, "Thibodaux," was apparently officially adopted in 1900.

In January 1844, the prominent statesman and U.S. Senator Henry Clay, the "Great Compromiser," visited Thibodaux for several days as part of his campaign for the U.S. Presidency. A residential lane along the canal connecting Bayou Lafourche to Bayou Terrebonne was later named in his honor.

Confederate General Braxton Bragg, the victor at Chickamauga, and his wife had a plantation, "Bivouac," just north of Thibodaux and attended services at St. John's Episcopal Church on Jackson Street, founded by Bishop Leonidas Polk, the owner of "Leighton" plantation and later a Confederate lieutenant general killed in action.

In 1896, the first rural free delivery of mail in Louisiana began in Thibodaux. It was the second such RFD in the United States.

=== Civil War ===
On June 20, 1863, Texas Confederate cavalry forces attacked the Union force occupying Thibodaux and captured the town. In a letter dated July 1, 1863, to his sister, Confederate Texas cavalryman Benjamin Franklin "Frank" Price proudly described the courage of his horse and a dramatic cavalry charge across the rebuilt Jackson Street bridge:

I wish you could have seen Rowdy in the charge upon [Thibodaux]ville, I never saw a better cavalry horse, about three hundred of the best horses of the regiment was selected by Lt[.] Col[.] Crump to make the charge, and I can assure you that Rowdy stood the fire of the enemies [sic] guns as well or better than the rider. The cowardly Yankees could have killed all of us while we were crossing the bridge of [Thibodaux] but they only fired three rounds before they skedaddled and then such a yell; In one hour after we entered the town, the victory was ours...

=== Post-Reconstruction and Thibodaux massacre ===
In the late 19th century, after having taken back control of the state government following the Reconstruction era by use of election fraud and violence by paramilitary forces such as the White League, which suppressed black voting, white Democrats continued to consolidate their power over the state government. In the late 1880s they were challenged temporarily by a biracial coalition of Populists and Republicans. In this period, because blacks were skilled sugar workers, they briefly retained more rights and political power than did African Americans in the north of the state who worked as tenant farmers or sharecroppers on cotton plantations.

But from 1880, through the Louisiana Sugar Producers Association, some 200 major planters worked to regain slave conditions and control of workers, adopting uniform pay, withholding 80 percent of the workers' pay until after harvest, and making them accept scrip, redeemable only at plantation stores owned by the planters, rather than cash. Cane workers struck intermittently against these conditions.

The Knights of Labor organized a chapter in 1886 in Shreveport, Louisiana and attracted many cane workers seeking better conditions. A sugar cane workers' strike in Lafourche and three neighboring parishes involved 10,000 workers, 1,000 of whom were white, during the critical "rolling period" of the sugar cane harvest. Planters were alarmed both by outside labor organizations and the thought of losing their total crops. The governor called in the state militia at the planters' request; they protected strikebreakers and evicted black workers. The strike was broken in Terrebonne Parish.

Paramilitary forces closed off Thibodaux, where numerous black workers had taken refuge. A New Orleans newspaper reported that "for three weeks past the negro women of the town have been making threats to the effect that if the white men resorted to arms they would burn the town and [end] the lives of the white women and children with their cane knives." Similarly, in the days leading up to the climactic event, it was reported that "[s]ome of the colored women made open threats against the people and the community, declaring that they would destroy any house in the town" and that "[n]ot a few of the negroes boasted that in case a fight was made they were fully prepared for it." One historian adds:

As late as November 21 some still comported themselves with confidence, and perhaps bravado, on the sidewalks. Mary Pugh, widow of Richard Pugh, owner of Live Oak Plantation in Lafourche Parish, reported "meeting negro men singly or two or three together with guns on their shoulders going down town & negro women on each side telling them to 'fight - yes - fight we'll be there.'"

On November 23, after the ambush and wounding of two pickets posted in the southern section of town, the militia committee began to indiscriminately shoot black workers and some family members, killing an estimated 35 (and quite possibly more) in what is called the "Thibodaux massacre" of November 23, 1887. The incident is generally considered to be the second bloodiest labor dispute in U.S. history. Casualties including wounded and missing were claimed by some to be in the hundreds, but there has never been an accurate count.

The cane workers returned to the plantations under conditions dictated by white planters. The massacre and subsequent disenfranchisement of blacks in Louisiana at the turn of the century by making voter registration more difficult, and white Democrats' imposition of Jim Crow, ended labor organizing of cane workers until the 1940s.

== Geography ==
According to the United States Census Bureau, the city has a total area of 5.47 square miles (14.2 km^{2}), all land.

=== Climate ===
Climate data for Thibodaux, Louisiana (1991–2020 normals, extremes 1893–present)
Month	Jan	Feb	Mar	Apr	May	Jun	Jul	Aug	Sep	Oct	Nov	Dec	Year
Record high °F (°C)	87 (31)	88 (31)	93 (34)	94 (34)	99 (37)	102 (39)	104 (40)	105 (41)	100 (38)	99 (37)	92 (33)	90 (32)	105 (41)
Mean maximum °F (°C)	77.4 (25.2)	79.8 (26.6)	83.1 (28.4)	86.5 (30.3)	91.5 (33.1)	94.3 (34.6)	95.9 (35.5)	96.1 (35.6)	94.3 (34.6)	89.7 (32.1)	83.8 (28.8)	80.1 (26.7)	96.8 (36.0)
Mean daily maximum °F (°C)	63.8 (17.7)	67.9 (19.9)	73.9 (23.3)	79.4 (26.3)	86.0 (30.0)	90.5 (32.5)	92.0 (33.3)	92.1 (33.4)	88.8 (31.6)	81.8 (27.7)	72.7 (22.6)	66.3 (19.1)	79.6 (26.4)
Daily mean °F (°C)	54.2 (12.3)	58.2 (14.6)	63.9 (17.7)	69.6 (20.9)	76.6 (24.8)	81.9 (27.7)	83.6 (28.7)	83.5 (28.6)	79.9 (26.6)	71.4 (21.9)	62.2 (16.8)	56.4 (13.6)	70.1 (21.2)
Mean daily minimum °F (°C)	44.5 (6.9)	48.5 (9.2)	53.8 (12.1)	59.7 (15.4)	67.3 (19.6)	73.2 (22.9)	75.2 (24.0)	74.9 (23.8)	71.1 (21.7)	60.9 (16.1)	51.8 (11.0)	46.5 (8.1)	60.6 (15.9)
Mean minimum °F (°C)	27.3 (−2.6)	32.2 (0.1)	35.8 (2.1)	43.3 (6.3)	54.7 (12.6)	65.8 (18.8)	69.9 (21.1)	68.9 (20.5)	59.2 (15.1)	44.5 (6.9)	34.1 (1.2)	30.0 (−1.1)	25.7 (−3.5)
Record low °F (°C)	10 (−12)	6 (−14)	23 (−5)	30 (−1)	34 (1)	50 (10)	59 (15)	57 (14)	37 (3)	27 (−3)	20 (−7)	9 (−13)	6 (−14)
Average precipitation inches (mm)	5.76 (146)	4.38 (111)	4.85 (123)	4.94 (125)	5.91 (150)	8.67 (220)	8.41 (214)	8.48 (215)	5.96 (151)	4.72 (120)	3.80 (97)	5.25 (133)	71.13 (1,807)
Average precipitation days (≥ 0.01 in)	12.5	9.6	9.1	8.3	8.9	14.6	17.5	15.8	11.4	8.3	7.9	10.2	134.1
Source: NOAA

== Demographics ==
Historical population
Census	Pop.	Note	%±
1850	1,242		—
1860	1,380		11.1%
1870	1,922		39.3%
1880	1,515		−21.2%
1890	2,078		37.2%
1900	3,253		56.5%
1910	3,824		17.6%
1920	3,526		−7.8%
1930	4,442		26.0%
1940	5,851		31.7%
1950	7,730		32.1%
1960	13,403		73.4%
1970	15,028		12.1%
1980	15,810		5.2%
1990	14,035		−11.2%
2000	14,431		2.8%
2010	14,566		0.9%
2020	15,948		9.5%
2025 (est.)	15,573	▼	−2.4%
U.S. Decennial Census

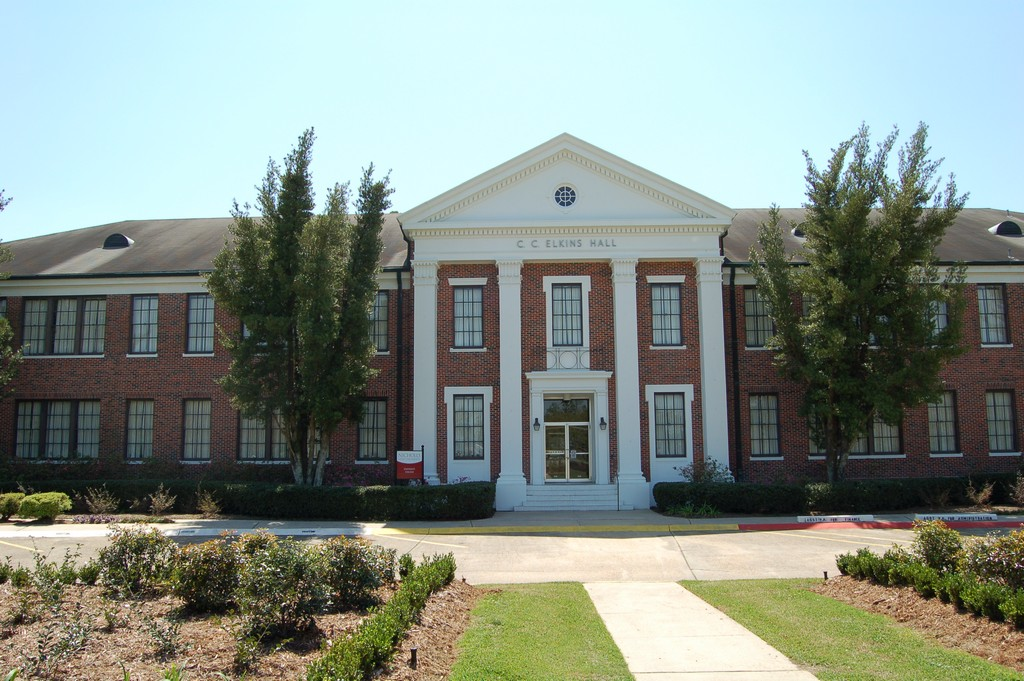
Charles C. Elkins Hall is one of 28 sites in Thibodaux listed on the National Register of Historic Places.

=== Racial and ethnic composition ===
Thibodaux city, Louisiana – Racial and ethnic composition Note: the US Census treats Hispanic/Latino as an ethnic category. This table excludes Latinos from the racial categories and assigns them to a separate category. Hispanics/Latinos may be of any race.
Race / Ethnicity (NH = Non-Hispanic)	Pop 2000	Pop 2010	Pop 2020	% 2000	% 2010	% 2020
White alone (NH)	9,164	9,113	8,580	63.50%	62.56%	53.80%
Black or African American alone (NH)	4,847	4,753	6,057	33.59%	32.63%	37.98%
Native American or Alaska Native alone (NH)	53	77	87	0.37%	0.53%	0.55%
Asian alone (NH)	92	151	116	0.64%	1.04%	0.73%
Native Hawaiian or Pacific Islander alone (NH)	2	4	5	0.01%	0.03%	0.03%
Other race alone (NH)	9	14	28	0.06%	0.10%	0.18%
Mixed race or Multiracial (NH)	116	164	336	0.80%	1.13%	2.11%
Hispanic or Latino (any race)	148	290	739	1.03%	1.99%	4.63%
Total	14,431	14,566	15,948	100.00%	100.00%	100.00%

=== 2020 census ===
As of the 2020 census, Thibodaux had a population of 15,948. The median age was 33.9 years. 19.6% of residents were under the age of 18 and 16.2% of residents were 65 years of age or older. For every 100 females there were 75.8 males, and for every 100 females age 18 and over there were 70.6 males age 18 and over.

100.0% of residents lived in urban areas, while 0.0% lived in rural areas.

There were 6,252 households in Thibodaux, of which 27.4% had children under the age of 18 living in them. Of all households, 32.3% were married-couple households, 20.5% were households with a male householder and no spouse or partner present, and 40.3% were households with a female householder and no spouse or partner present. About 36.3% of all households were made up of individuals and 14.3% had someone living alone who was 65 years of age or older.

There were 6,894 housing units, of which 9.3% were vacant. The homeowner vacancy rate was 2.3% and the rental vacancy rate was 7.2%.

Thibodaux racial composition as of 2020
Race	Number	Percentage
White	8,697	54.5%
Black or African American	6,098	38.2%
American Indian and Alaska Native	106	0.7%
Asian	120	0.8%
Native Hawaiian and Other Pacific Islander	5	0.0%
Some other race	288	1.8%
Two or more races	634	4.0%

=== 2000 census ===
As of the 2000 census, there were 14,431 people, 5,500 households, and 3,355 families residing in the city. The population density was 2,636.8 inhabitants per square mile (1,018.1/km^{2}). There were 6,004 housing units at an average density of 1,097.0 per square mile (423.6/km^{2}). The racial makeup of the city was 64.04% White, 33.76% African American, 0.37% Native American, 0.64% Asian, 0.02% Pacific Islander, 0.26% from other races, and 0.90% from two or more races. Hispanic or Latino of any race were 1.03% of the population.

There were 5,500 households, out of which 29.7% had children under the age of 18 living with them, 38.1% were married couples living together, 19.4% had a female householder with no husband present, and 39.0% were non-families. 31.1% of all households were made up of individuals, and 11.5% had someone living alone who was 65 years of age or older. The average household size was 2.42 and the average family size was 3.10.

In the city, the population was spread out, with 24.6% under the age of 18, 17.3% from 18 to 24, 25.1% from 25 to 44, 18.9% from 45 to 64, and 14.1% who were 65 years of age or older. The median age was 31 years. For every 100 females, there were 85.9 males. For every 100 females age 18 and over, there were 79.3 males.

The median income for a household in the city was $26,697, and the median income for a family was $36,551. Males had a median income of $31,464 versus $21,144 for females. The per capita income for the city was $16,966. About 20.6% of families and 25.1% of the population were below the poverty line, including 36.3% of those under age 18 and 18.2% of those age 65 or over.

== Arts and culture ==
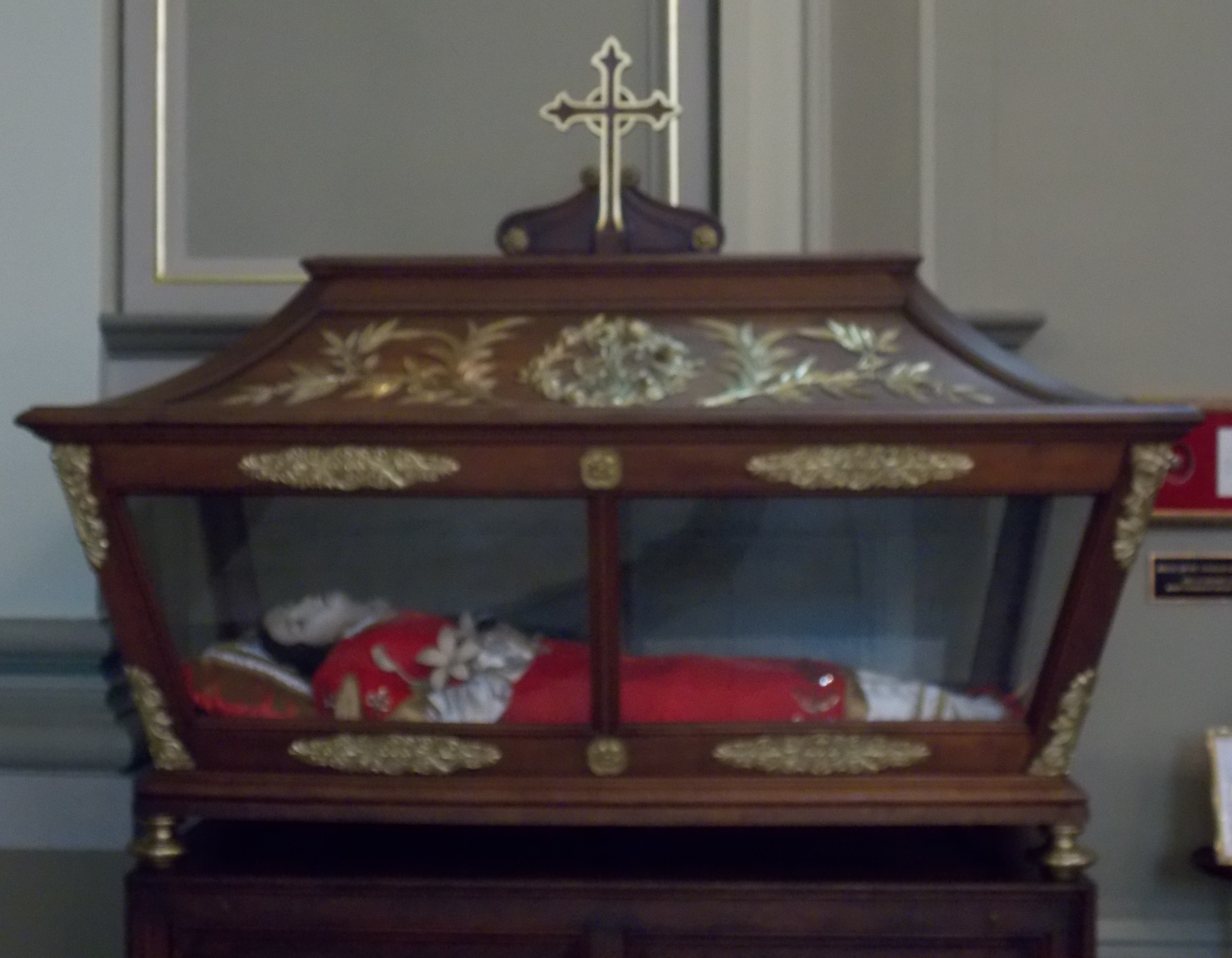
St. Valérie's relics in St. Joseph Co-Cathedral

The Roman Catholic patron saints of Thibodaux are Saint Valérie, an early Christian martyr, and Saint Vitalis of Milan, her husband, also a martyr. A life-sized reliquary of Saint Valérie, containing an arm bone, was brought to Thibodaux in 1868 and is displayed in her shrine in St. Joseph Co-Cathedral in Thibodaux. A smaller reliquary, with a relic of St. Vitalis, is displayed near St. Valérie's reliquary. St. Valérie has traditionally been invoked for intercession in protecting Thibodaux from hurricanes.

Richard D'Alton Williams, a well-known 19th-century Irish patriot, poet, and physician, died of tuberculosis in Thibodaux in 1862, and is buried in St. Joseph Cemetery. His headstone was erected that year by Irish members of the 8th New Hampshire Volunteer Infantry, then encamped in Thibodaux. A famous Mississippi blues musician, Eddie "Guitar Slim" Jones, is buried in Thibodaux, where he often played, and where his manager, Hosea Hill, resided. Two-term Governor of Louisiana Francis T. Nicholls is buried in the Episcopal Cemetery on Jackson Street.

== Government ==
The mayor of Thibodaux is elected at-large and is currently Kevin Clement. The city council of seven is elected from five single-member districts, and two at-large members. Thibodaux is in Parish Council Districts 1, 2, 3, and 4.

In the Louisiana Legislature, Thibodaux is currently represented by District 55 Rep. Bryan Fontenot (R-Thibodaux) and Sen. Bret Allain (R-Jeanerette). In the United States Congress, it is represented by Rep. Troy Carter (D-New Orleans), Rep. Clay Higgins (R-Lafayette), Sen. Bill Cassidy (R- Baton Rouge) and Sen. John Neely Kennedy (R-Madisonville).

The Louisiana Office of Juvenile Justice operates an office in Thibodaux.

The United States Postal Service operates the Thibodaux Post Office.

ZIP codes for Thibodaux are 70301, 70302, and 70310. Thibodaux's telephone area code is 985.

== Education ==
Residents are zoned to schools in the Lafourche Parish Public Schools.

Zoned elementary schools include:

- C. M. Washington Elementary School
- Thibodaux Elementary School
- W.S. Lafargue Elementary School

Zoned middle schools include:

- Sixth Ward Middle School (Chackbay, Choupic, and Choctaw areas only)
- Thibodaux Middle School (Opened in August 2023)

West Thibodaux Middle School and East Thibodaux Middle School served the area until 2023 when all students and faculty merged into one newer building with the old schools being demolished not long after.

Thibodaux residents are zoned to Thibodaux High School. From 1950 until 1968, C.M. Washington High School served as the segregated public school for African Americans in Thibodaux.

Catholic schools (of the Roman Catholic Diocese of Houma–Thibodaux) include:

- Edward Douglas White Catholic High School
- St. Genevieve Catholic Elementary
- St. Joseph Catholic Elementary

Charter school:

- Bayou Community Academy

Colleges:

- Nicholls State University

Lafourche Parish is in the service area of Fletcher Technical Community College.

== Media ==
The local newspaper is The Daily Comet. It was founded in 1889 as Lafourche Comet. It was owned by The New York Times Company from 1979 until 2011. The company sold this and other regional newspapers to Halifax Media Group.

Cable television and Internet are provided in Thibodaux by Charter Spectrum, U-verse TV, and REV.

== Notable people ==
- Eric Andolsek, professional football player for the Detroit Lions
- Charlton Beattie, U.S. federal judge; practiced law in Thibodaux
- Rezin Bowie, Louisiana politician and inventor of the Bowie knife; resided six years on Acadia Plantation near Thibodaux
- Braxton Bragg, Confederate general, slave-owner and planter on Bayou Lafourche in 1856-1861
- Adrian Joseph Caillouet, U.S. federal judge
- Kody Chamberlain, comic book writer and artist
- Thomas G. Clausen, professor at Nicholls State University from 1967 to 1972; last elected state superintendent of education, 1984-1988
- Mark Davis, professional basketball player
- Ronald Dominique, serial killer born and raised in Thibodaux who killed and raped at least 23 men
- Jeremy Gaubert, winner of 2009 World Poker Open
- Mary Gauthier, folk singer-songwriter; grew up in Thibodaux
- Jarvis Green, defensive end for the Denver Broncos
- Walter Guion, U.S. senator from Louisiana
- Damian Johnson, player for the Minnesota Golden Gophers men's basketball team
- Clay Knobloch, former Lieutenant Governor of Louisiana
- Louis La Garde, soldier, medical doctor and author
- Kyren Lacy, LSU Wide Receiver
- Theodore K. Lawless, dermatologist, medical researcher, and philanthropist
- Oliver Marcelle, baseball player
- Graham Patrick Martin, actor TV: Major Crimes, The Closer, Two and a Half Men; Movies: The Anna Nicole Story, Bukowski, Somewhere Slow
- Whitmell P. Martin, congressman from Louisiana; moved to Thibodaux
- Jordan Mills, football player
- Numa F. Montet, congressman from Louisiana
- Doug Moreau, football player
- Amos Moses, one-armed alligator trapper
- Drake Nevis, football player
- Francis T. Nicholls, Confederate brigadier general, two-term governor of Louisiana, and Louisiana Supreme Court justice; moved to Ridgefield Plantation near Thibodaux
- Harvey Peltier, Jr., state senator from 1964 to 1976; first president of the University of Louisiana System trustees from 1975 until his death in 1980
- Harvey Peltier, Sr., member of both houses of the Louisiana State Legislature from Thibodaux, 1924-1940
- Jerome "Dee" Richard, former member of the Louisiana House of Representatives from Thibodaux; one of two Independents in the legislature
- Amik Robertson, cornerback for the Detroit Lions
- John Robichaux, jazz musician
- Greg Robinson, offensive lineman for the Detroit Lions
- Junius P. Rodriguez, academic and author
- Tom Roussel, football player
- Dustin Schuetter, actor, producer, director and screenwriter
- Billy Tauzin, congressman who lived in Thibodaux while he was in office
- Theodore Ward, noted African-American playwright
- Edward Douglass White, Jr., Associate Justice of the United States Supreme Court and later Chief Justice of the United States
- Edward Douglass White, Sr., governor of Louisiana
- Richard D'Alton Williams, Irish patriot, poet, and "Shamrock" of The Nation

== See also ==
- Warren J. Harang Jr. Municipal Auditorium
