= National Register of Historic Places listings in Lafourche Parish, Louisiana =

Location of Lafourche Parish in Louisiana

This is a list of the National Register of Historic Places listings in Lafourche Parish, Louisiana.

This is intended to be a complete list of the properties and districts on the National Register of Historic Places in Lafourche Parish, Louisiana, United States. The locations of National Register properties and districts for which the latitude and longitude coordinates are included below, may be seen in a map.

There are 38 properties and districts listed on the National Register in the parish, including 1 National Historic Landmark.

This National Park Service list is complete through NPS recent listings posted September 25, 2026.

== Current listings ==
	Name on the Register	Image	Date listed	Location	City or town	Description
1	Acadia Plantation	Acadia Plantation	May 29, 1987 (#87000849)	Address restricted	Thibodaux	Demolished and converted into a residential housing district in 2010.
2	Bank of Lafourche Building	Bank of Lafourche Building	March 5, 1986 (#86000425)	206 Green Street; 29°47′52″N 90°49′13″W	Thibodaux	
3	Bank of Lockport	Bank of Lockport	March 30, 1995 (#95000299)	111-113 Barataria Street; 29°38′47″N 90°32′17″W	Lockport	
4	Bayou Boeuf Elementary School	Bayou Boeuf Elementary School	February 25, 2004 (#04000082)	4138 LA 307; 29°52′05″N 90°35′38″W	Thibodaux	
5	Bayou Boeuf Settlement	Bayou Boeuf Settlement	October 17, 2018 (#100003026)	4056 LA 307; 29°52′11″N 90°35′47″W	Kraemer	
6	Bouverans Plantation House	Bouverans Plantation House	July 21, 1983 (#83000527)	Along LA 1, about 2.1 miles (3.4 km) southeast of Lockport; 29°37′52″N 90°30′31″W	Lockport	
7	Breaux House	Breaux House	March 5, 1986 (#86000426)	401 Patriot Street; 29°47′49″N 90°49′08″W	Thibodaux	
8	Building at 108 Green Street	Building at 108 Green Street	March 5, 1986 (#86000424)	108 Green Street; 29°47′53″N 90°49′13″W	Thibodaux	
9	Chanticleer Gift Shop	Chanticleer Gift Shop	April 29, 1986 (#86000877)	103 West 3rd Street; 29°47′51″N 90°49′07″W	Thibodaux	
10	Chatchie Plantation House	Chatchie Plantation House	October 25, 1982 (#82000442)	Along LA 308, about 3.6 miles (5.8 km) east of Thibodaux; 29°46′27″N 90°46′04″W	Thibodaux	
11	Citizens Bank of Lafourche	Citizens Bank of Lafourche	March 5, 1986 (#86000427)	413 West 4th Street; 29°47′49″N 90°49′16″W	Thibodaux	
12	Dansereau House	Dansereau House	November 21, 1978 (#78001425)	506 St. Philip Street; 29°47′46″N 90°49′17″W	Thibodaux	
13	Frost House	Frost House	August 6, 2008 (#08000766)	612 St. Philip Street; 29°47′41″N 90°49′17″W	Thibodaux	
14	Golden Meadow High School	Golden Meadow High School	November 23, 1998 (#98001426)	630 South Bayou Drive; 29°23′19″N 90°15′53″W	Golden Meadow	
15	Grand Theatre	Grand Theatre	March 5, 1986 (#86000428)	401 Green Street; 29°47′49″N 90°49′11″W	Thibodaux	Demolished June 1995
16	House at 816 Jackson Street	House at 816 Jackson Street	July 22, 2009 (#09000547)	816 Jackson Street; 29°47′34″N 90°49′23″W	Thibodaux	
17	Lafourche Parish Courthouse	Lafourche Parish Courthouse	August 21, 1979 (#79001068)	200 Green Street; 29°47′52″N 90°49′11″W	Thibodaux	
18	Lamartina Building	Lamartina Building	March 5, 1986 (#86000429)	700-704 West 3rd Street; 29°47′51″N 90°49′19″W	Thibodaux	
19	Laurel Valley Sugar Plantation	Laurel Valley Sugar Plantation	March 24, 1978 (#78001426)	Along Laurel Valley Road, about 2.3 miles (3.7 km) east of Thibodaux; 29°48′04″N 90°46′45″W	Thibodaux	
20	Ledet House		May 23, 1997 (#97000468)	2117 LA 308, about 7 miles (11 km) west of Raceland; 29°45′09″N 90°42′46″W	Raceland	
21	Lefort House	Lefort House	September 4, 2008 (#08000843)	1302 Louisiana Highway 1; 29°45′57″N 90°45′55″W	Thibodaux	
22	McCulla House	McCulla House	March 5, 1986 (#86000430)	422 East 1st Street; 29°47′52″N 90°48′54″W	Thibodaux	
23	Merchants and Planters Bank	Merchants and Planters Bank	March 30, 1995 (#95000297)	110 Main Street; 29°38′50″N 90°32′20″W	Lockport	
24	Francis T. Nicholls Junior College Main Building	Francis T. Nicholls Junior College Main Building	February 12, 1999 (#99000184)	906 East 1st Street; 29°47′40″N 90°48′06″W	Thibodaux	
25	Peltier House	Peltier House	April 29, 1986 (#86000878)	403 Canal Boulevard; 29°47′48″N 90°49′06″W	Thibodaux	
26	Harvey Andrew Peltier Sr. House	Harvey Andrew Peltier Sr. House	April 14, 2020 (#100005187)	430 East 1st St. 29°47′55″N 90°48′55″W	Thibodaux	
27	Percy-Lobdell Building	Percy-Lobdell Building	March 5, 1986 (#86000431)	314 Saint Mary St. 29°47′46″N 90°49′30″W	Thibodaux	Building is home to the Wetlands Acadian Cultural Center of Jean Lafitte National Historic Park and to Martha Sowell Utley Memorial Branch of Lafourche Parish Library.
28	Rienzi Plantation House	Rienzi Plantation House	May 31, 1980 (#80001736)	215 East Bayou Road; 29°48′00″N 90°48′47″W	Thibodaux	
29	Riviere Building	Riviere Building	March 5, 1986 (#86000432)	405 West 3rd Street; 29°47′50″N 90°49′13″W	Thibodaux	
30	Riviere House	Riviere House	March 5, 1986 (#86000433)	208 Canal Boulevard; 29°47′52″N 90°49′07″W	Thibodaux	
31	Robichaux House	Robichaux House	March 5, 1986 (#86000434)	322 East 2nd Street; 29°47′51″N 90°48′58″W	Thibodaux	
32	S.S. Halo, shipwreck and remains		October 2, 2017 (#100000520)	Address restricted	Port Fourchon	Steam tanker built in 1920. It was torpedoed and sunk by submarine U-506 on May 20, 1942.
33	St. John's Episcopal Church and Cemetery	St. John's Episcopal Church and Cemetery	September 13, 1977 (#77000672)	718 Jackson Street; 29°47′38″N 90°49′25″W	Thibodaux	
34	Saint Joseph's Co-Cathedral and Rectory	Saint Joseph's Co-Cathedral and Rectory	March 5, 1986 (#86000435)	721 Canal Boulevard; 29°47′37″N 90°49′10″W	Thibodaux	
35	Jean Baptiste Thibodaux House		November 2, 1982 (#82000443)	3515 LA 308, about 1.8 miles (2.9 km) northwest of Raceland; 29°44′12″N 90°37′35″W	Raceland	
36	Zephirin Toups Sr. House	Zephirin Toups Sr. House	August 12, 1993 (#93000820)	Along Bayou Blue Bypass Road, about 5.9 miles (9.5 km) southeast of Thibodaux, Louisiana; 29°43′26″N 90°46′14″W	Thibodaux	
37	Vives House	Vives House	July 15, 2009 (#09000517)	923 Jackson Street; 29°47′28″N 90°49′21″W	Thibodaux	
38	Edward Douglass White House	Edward Douglass White House	December 8, 1976 (#76000964)	2295 LA 1; 29°49′27″N 90°54′41″W	Thibodaux	

== See also ==
- List of National Historic Landmarks in Louisiana
- National Register of Historic Places listings in Louisiana
