= Merchants and Planters Bank =

Merchants and Planters Bank may refer to:

- Merchants and Planters Bank (Clarendon, Arkansas)
- Merchants and Planters Bank (Lockport, Louisiana)
