= McCulla House =

Historic house in Louisiana, United States

- U.S. National Register of Historic Places
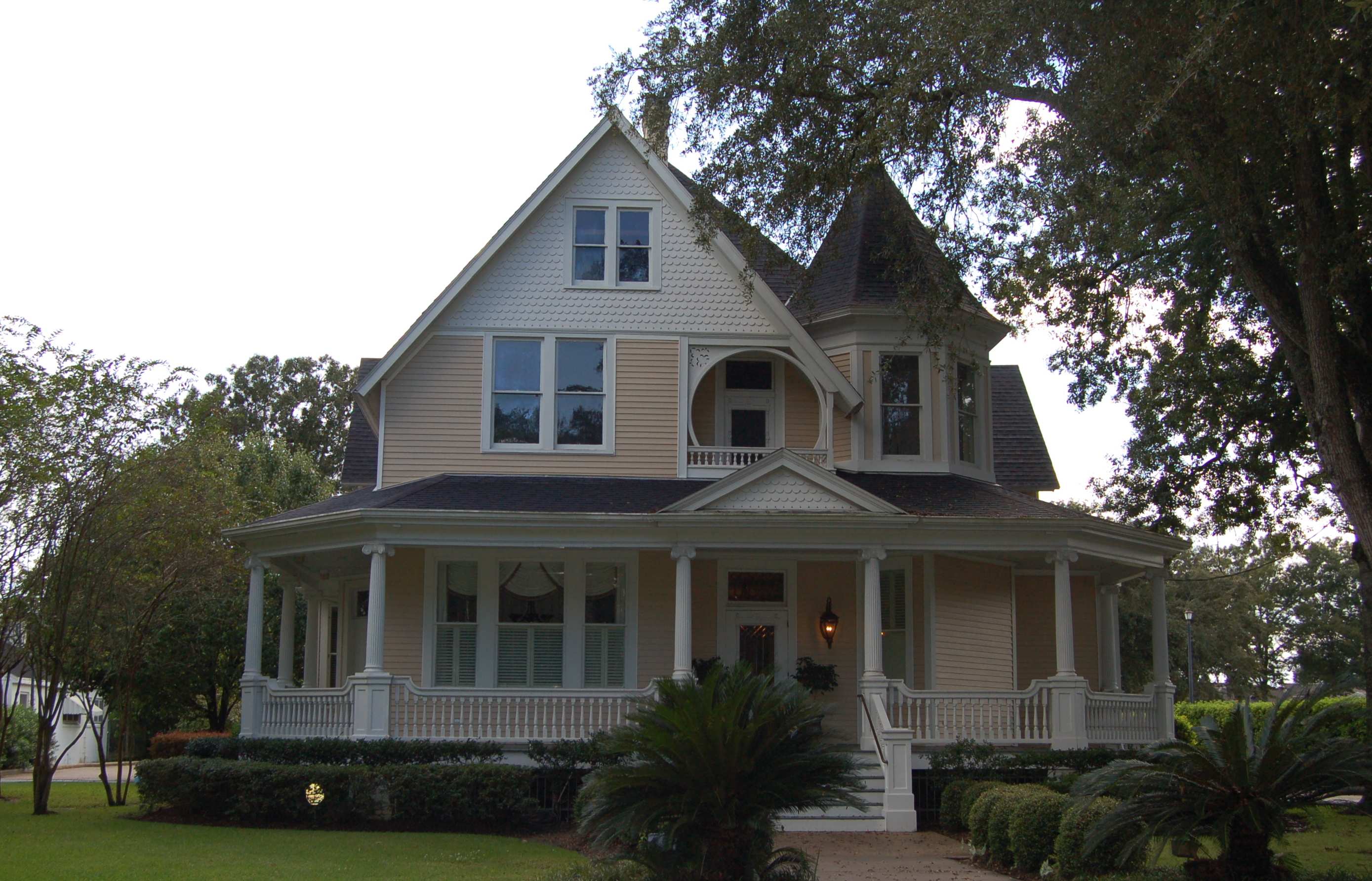

- Location within Louisiana Location within the United States
- Location: 422 East 1st Street, Thibodaux, Louisiana
- Coordinates: 29°47′52″N 90°48′54″W
- Built: c.1907
- Built by: John McCulla
- Architectural style: Queen Anne Revival, Colonial Revival
- MPS: Thibodaux MRA
- NRHP reference No.: 86000430
- Added to NRHP: March 5, 1986

The McCulla House is a historic house located at 422 East 1st Street in Thibodaux, Louisiana.

Built in c.1907, the structure is a two-story frame residence in Queen Anne Revival style with Colonial Revival gallery columns. The building features an octagonal turret with faceted roof, an horseshoe arched balcony and an Ionic gallery which turns 45 degrees at the corners.

The house was listed on the National Register of Historic Places on March 5, 1986.

It is one of 14 individually NRHP-listed properties in the "Thibodaux Multiple Resource Area", which also includes:

- Bank of Lafourche Building
- Breaux House
- Building at 108 Green Street
- Chanticleer Gift Shop
- Citizens Bank of Lafourche
- Grand Theatre
- Lamartina Building
- Peltier House
- Percy-Lobdell Building
- Riviere Building
- Riviere House
- Robichaux House
- St. Joseph Co-Cathedral and Rectory

== See also ==
- National Register of Historic Places listings in Lafourche Parish, Louisiana
