= Ledet House =

Historic house in Louisiana, United States

- U.S. National Register of Historic Places
- Location within Louisiana Location within the United States
- Location: 2117 LA 308, about 7 miles (11 km) west of Raceland
- Nearest city: Raceland, Louisiana
- Coordinates: 29°45′09″N 90°42′46″W
- Area: 4 acres (1.6 ha)
- Built: c.1870
- Architectural style: Greek Revival
- NRHP reference No.: 97000468
- Added to NRHP: May 23, 1997

Ledet House is a historic residence located at 2117 LA 308, about 7 miles (11 km) west of Raceland, Louisiana.

Built in c.1870, the house is a one-story framed cottage in Greek Revival style. The property on which the house stands was bought by Paulin A. Ledet and Joachim Prosper Ledet in 1876 from Leon Falgout.

The house was added to the National Register of Historic Places on May 23, 1997.

== See also ==
- National Register of Historic Places listings in Lafourche Parish, Louisiana
