= Peltier House =

Historic house in Louisiana, United States

- U.S. National Register of Historic Places
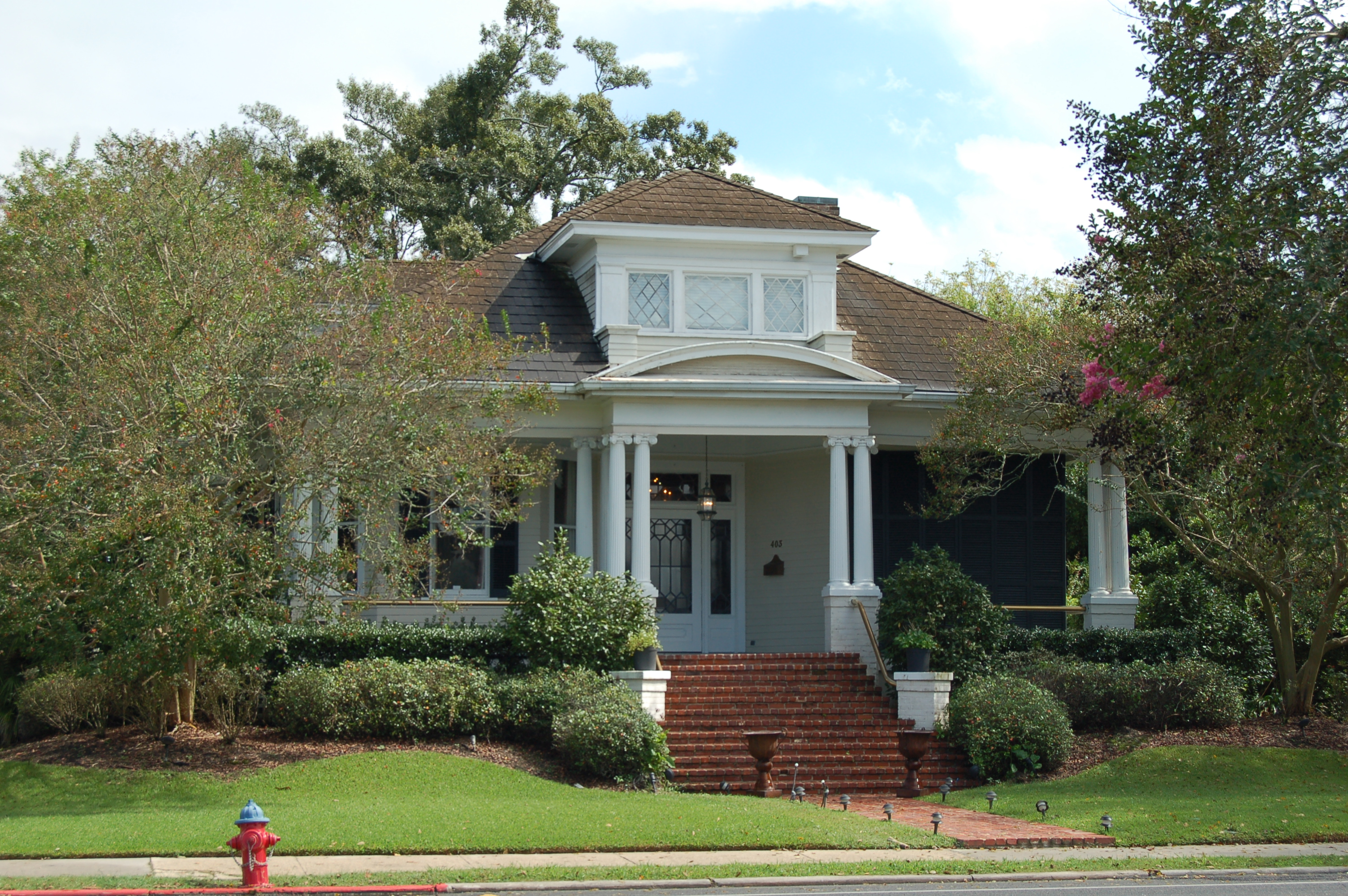

- Location within Louisiana Location within the United States
- Location: 403 Canal Boulevard, Thibodaux, Louisiana
- Coordinates: 29°47′48″N 90°49′06″W
- Built: 1910
- Built by: Sidney Peltier
- Architectural style: Colonial Revival
- MPS: Thibodaux MRA
- NRHP reference No.: 86000878
- Added to NRHP: April 29, 1986

The Peltier House is a historic house located at 403 Canal Boulevard in Thibodaux, Louisiana.

Built between 1910 and 1914, the house is a 1 1/2-story frame residence in Colonial Revival style. The front gallery features Ionic columns on brick bases. On the rear of the house a roughly contemporary garage is considered a contributing property.

The house was listed on the National Register of Historic Places on April 29, 1986.

It is one of 14 individually NRHP-listed properties in the "Thibodaux Multiple Resource Area", which also includes:

- Bank of Lafourche Building
- Breaux House
- Building at 108 Green Street
- Chanticleer Gift Shop
- Citizens Bank of Lafourche
- Grand Theatre
- Lamartina Building
- McCulla House
- Percy-Lobdell Building
- Riviere Building
- Riviere House
- Robichaux House
- St. Joseph Co-Cathedral and Rectory

== See also ==
- National Register of Historic Places listings in Lafourche Parish, Louisiana
