= Chanticleer Gift Shop =

- U.S. National Register of Historic Places
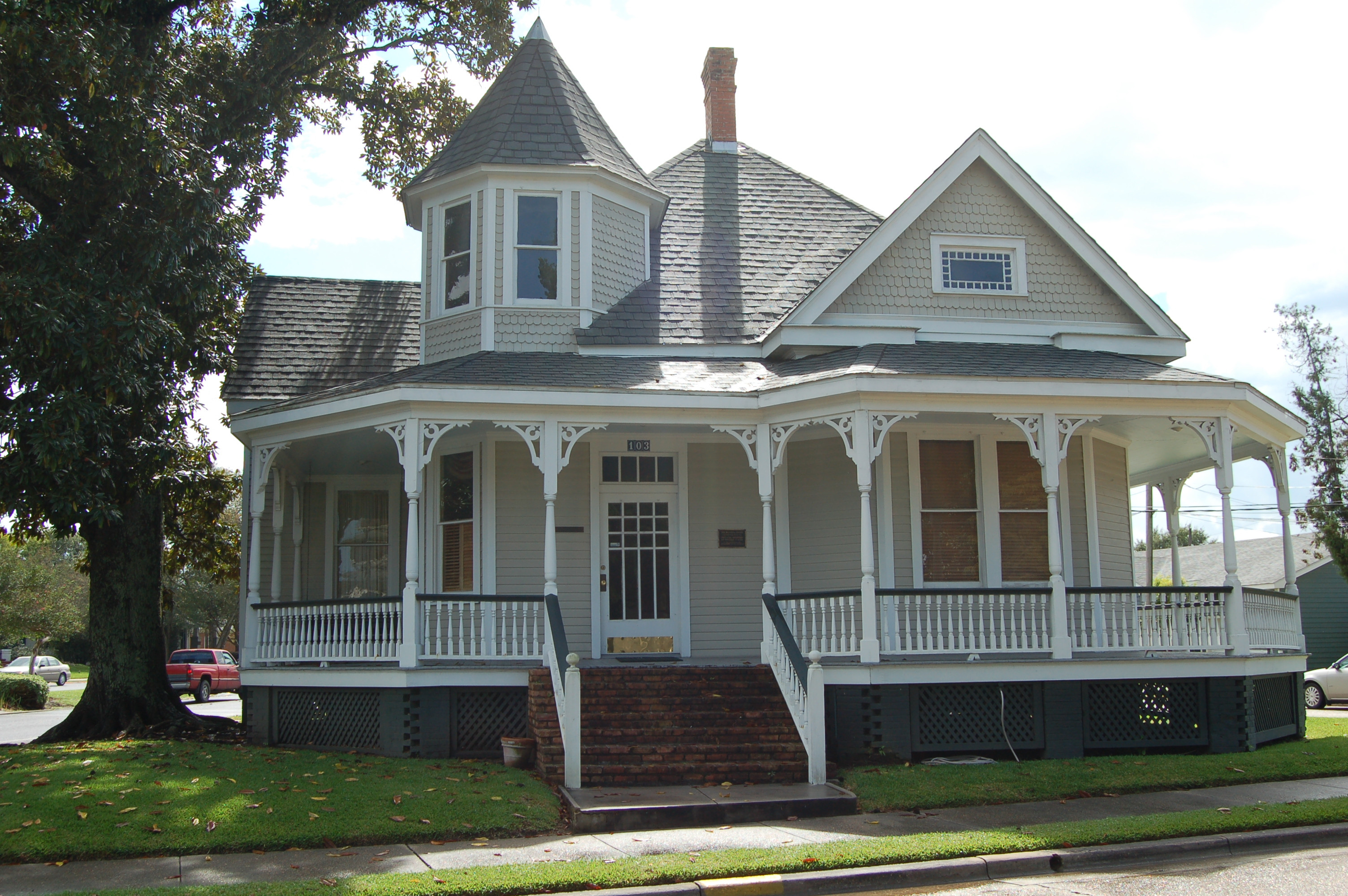

- Location within Louisiana Location within the United States
- Location: 103 West 3rd Street, Thibodaux, Louisiana
- Coordinates: 29°47′51″N 90°49′07″W
- Built: c.1900
- Architectural style: Queen Anne Revival, Eastlake
- MPS: Thibodaux MRA
- NRHP reference No.: 86000877
- Added to NRHP: April 29, 1986

The Chanticleer Gift Shop is a historic house located at 103 West 3rd Street in Thibodaux, Louisiana.

Built in c.1900, the structure is a single story frame residence in Queen Anne Revival style with Eastlake gallery details.

The house was listed on the National Register of Historic Places on April 29, 1986.

It is one of 14 individually NRHP-listed properties in the "Thibodaux Multiple Resource Area", which also includes:

- Bank of Lafourche Building
- Breaux House
- Building at 108 Green Street
- Citizens Bank of Lafourche
- Grand Theatre
- Lamartina Building
- McCulla House
- Peltier House
- Percy-Lobdell Building
- Riviere Building
- Riviere House
- Robichaux House
- St. Joseph Co-Cathedral and Rectory

== See also ==
- National Register of Historic Places listings in Lafourche Parish, Louisiana
