= Riviere Building =

- U.S. National Register of Historic Places
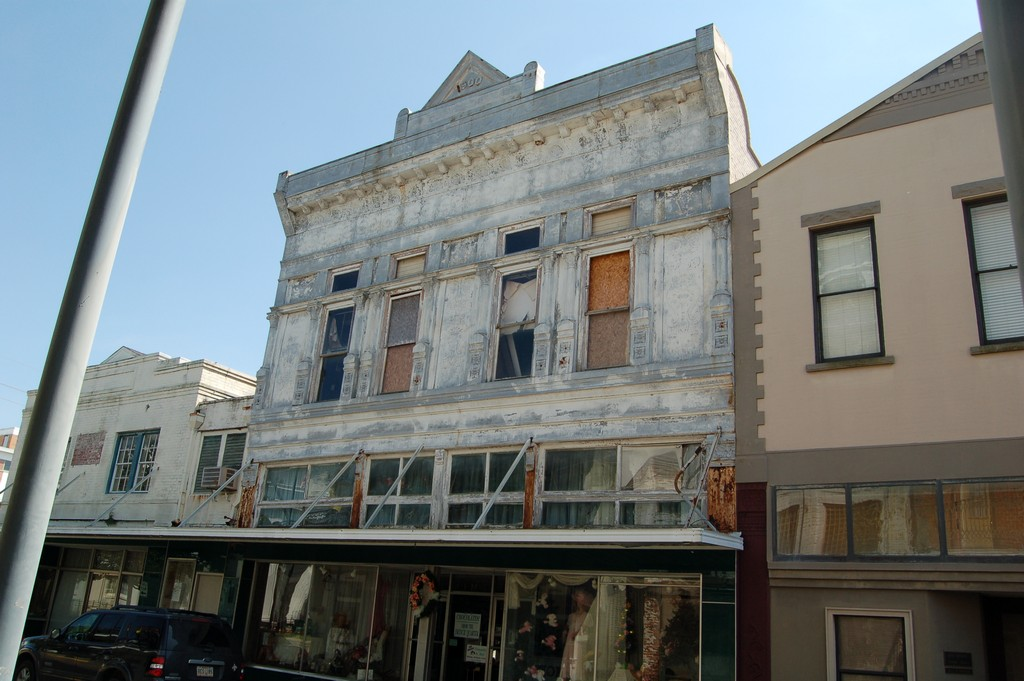
- Riviere Building in 2005

- Location within Louisiana Location within the United States
- Location: 405 West 3rd Street, Thibodaux, Louisiana
- Coordinates: 29°47′50″N 90°49′13″W
- Area: 0.16 acres (0.065 ha)
- Built: 1900
- Built by: Thomas A. Riviere
- Architectural style: Italianate
- MPS: Thibodaux MRA
- NRHP reference No.: 86000432
- Added to NRHP: March 5, 1986

The Riviere Building is a historic commercial building located at 405 West 3rd Street in Thibodaux, Louisiana.

Built in 1900, the structure is a two-story brick Italianate style commercial building with an elaborate pressed metal front. The facade was completely restored sometime between 2013 and 2016. (Note: Compare 2013 StreetView with 2016 StreetView)

The building was listed on the National Register of Historic Places on March 5, 1986.

It is one of 14 individually NRHP-listed properties in the "Thibodaux Multiple Resource Area", which also includes:

- Bank of Lafourche Building
- Breaux House
- Building at 108 Green Street
- Chanticleer Gift Shop
- Citizens Bank of Lafourche
- Grand Theatre
- Lamartina Building
- McCulla House
- Peltier House
- Percy-Lobdell Building
- Riviere House
- Robichaux House
- St. Joseph Co-Cathedral and Rectory

== See also ==
- National Register of Historic Places listings in Lafourche Parish, Louisiana
