= Bouverans Plantation House =

Historic house in Louisiana, United States

- U.S. National Register of Historic Places
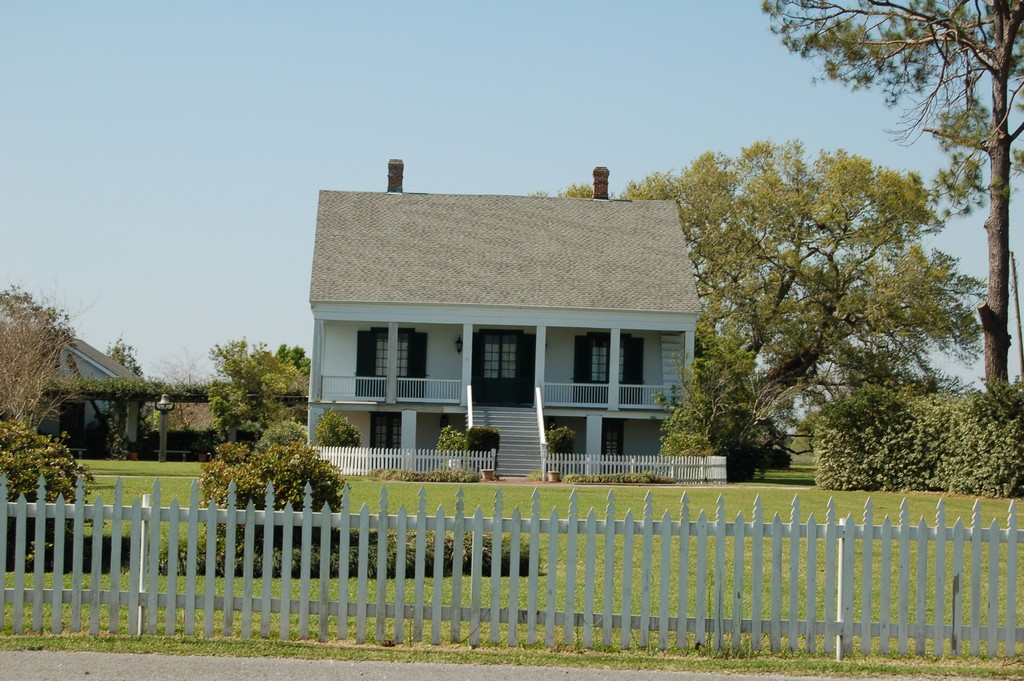

- Location within Louisiana Location within the United States
- Location: Along LA 1, about 2.1 miles (3.4 km) southeast of Lockport
- Nearest city: Lockport, Louisiana
- Coordinates: 29°37′52″N 90°30′31″W
- Area: 0.16 acres (0.065 ha)
- Built: 1860
- Architectural style: Greek Revival, French Creole
- NRHP reference No.: 83000527
- Added to NRHP: July 21, 1983

The Bouverans Plantation House, also known as Arialo, is a historic house on a former plantation in Lockport, Louisiana. It was built in 1860 for M. J. Claudet. It was one of the most productive sugarcane plantations in the parish in 1871–1872.

The house was designed in the Creole and Greek Revival architectural styles. It has been listed on the National Register of Historic Places since July 21, 1983.

== See also ==
- National Register of Historic Places listings in Lafourche Parish, Louisiana
