= Breaux House =

Historic house in Louisiana, United States

- U.S. National Register of Historic Places
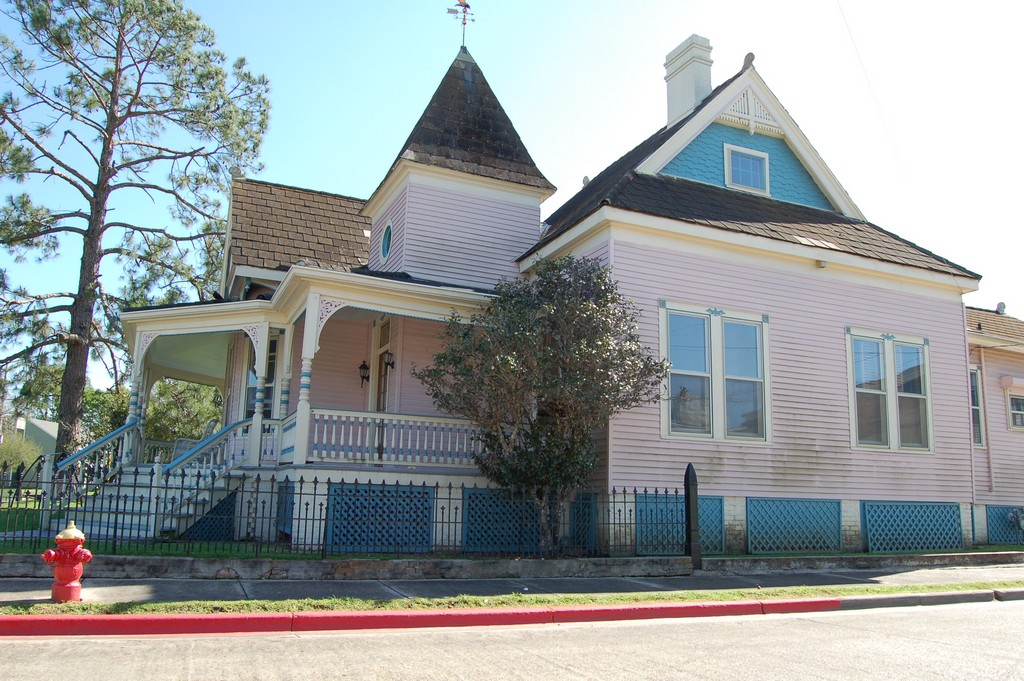

- Location within Louisiana Location within the United States
- Location: 401 Patriot Street, Thibodaux, Louisiana
- Coordinates: 29°47′49″N 90°49′08″W
- Built: 1890s
- Built by: Lewis Breaux
- Architectural style: Queen Anne Revival, Eastlake
- MPS: Thibodaux MRA
- NRHP reference No.: 86000426
- Added to NRHP: March 5, 1986

The Breaux House is a historic mansion located at 401 Patriot Street in Thibodaux, Louisiana, United States.

Built in the 1890s, the house is a single story frame Queen Anne Revival building with Eastlake gallery posts.

The building was listed on the National Register of Historic Places on March 5, 1986.

It is one of 14 individually NRHP-listed properties in the "Thibodaux Multiple Resource Area", which also includes:

- Bank of Lafourche Building
- Building at 108 Green Street
- Chanticleer Gift Shop
- Citizens Bank of Lafourche
- Grand Theatre
- Lamartina Building
- McCulla House
- Peltier House
- Percy-Lobdell Building
- Riviere Building
- Riviere House
- Robichaux House
- St. Joseph Co-Cathedral and Rectory

== See also ==
- National Register of Historic Places listings in Lafourche Parish, Louisiana
