= Jean Baptiste Thibodaux House =

Historic house in Louisiana, United States

- U.S. National Register of Historic Places
- Location within Louisiana Location within the United States
- Location: 3515 LA 308, about 1.8 miles (2.9 km) northwest of Raceland, Louisiana
- Coordinates: 29°44′12″N 90°37′35″W
- Area: 0.17 acres (0.069 ha)
- Built: c.1814
- Built by: Jean Baptiste Thibodaux
- NRHP reference No.: 82000443
- Added to NRHP: November 2, 1982

Jean Baptiste Thibodaux House, also known as Rosella Plantation House, is a historic mansion located at 3515 LA 308, about 1.8 miles (2.9 km) northwest of Raceland, Louisiana.

The house is a two-story Creole plantation house built in c.1814 by Jean Baptiste Thibodaux, who purchased the land parcel in 1810. The house was originally formed by four rooms. A two-story side wing was added at some time and, in the 1880s, a two-story rear wing containing a carriage area was also added to the building. The rear wing was deeply altered in 1956.

The mansion was added to the National Register of Historic Places on November 2, 1982.

== See also ==
- National Register of Historic Places listings in Lafourche Parish, Louisiana
