= Lamartina Building =

- U.S. National Register of Historic Places
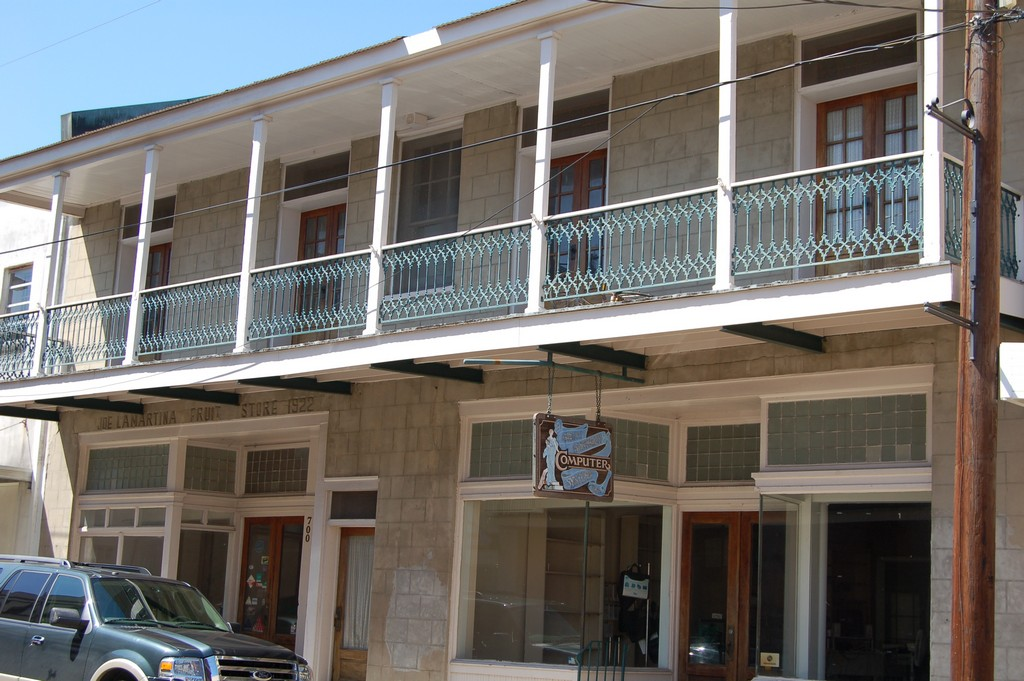

- Location within Louisiana Location within the United States
- Location: 700-704 West 3rd Street, Thibodaux, Louisiana
- Coordinates: 29°47′51″N 90°49′19″W
- Built: 1862
- MPS: Thibodaux MRA
- NRHP reference No.: 86000429
- Added to NRHP: March 5, 1986

The Lamartina Building is a historic commercial building located at 700-704 West 3rd Street in Thibodaux, Louisiana.

Built before the Civil War, the two-story brick commercial building features gable parapets and a wooden front gallery. The facade was stuccoed in 1922, and the structure has not been altered since then.

The building was listed on the National Register of Historic Places on March 5, 1986.

It is one of 14 individually NRHP-listed properties in the "Thibodaux Multiple Resource Area", which also includes:

- Bank of Lafourche Building
- Breaux House
- Building at 108 Green Street
- Chanticleer Gift Shop
- Citizens Bank of Lafourche
- Grand Theatre
- McCulla House
- Peltier House
- Percy-Lobdell Building
- Riviere Building
- Riviere House
- Robichaux House
- St. Joseph Co-Cathedral and Rectory

== See also ==
- National Register of Historic Places listings in Lafourche Parish, Louisiana
