= Vives House =

Historic house in Louisiana, United States

- U.S. National Register of Historic Places
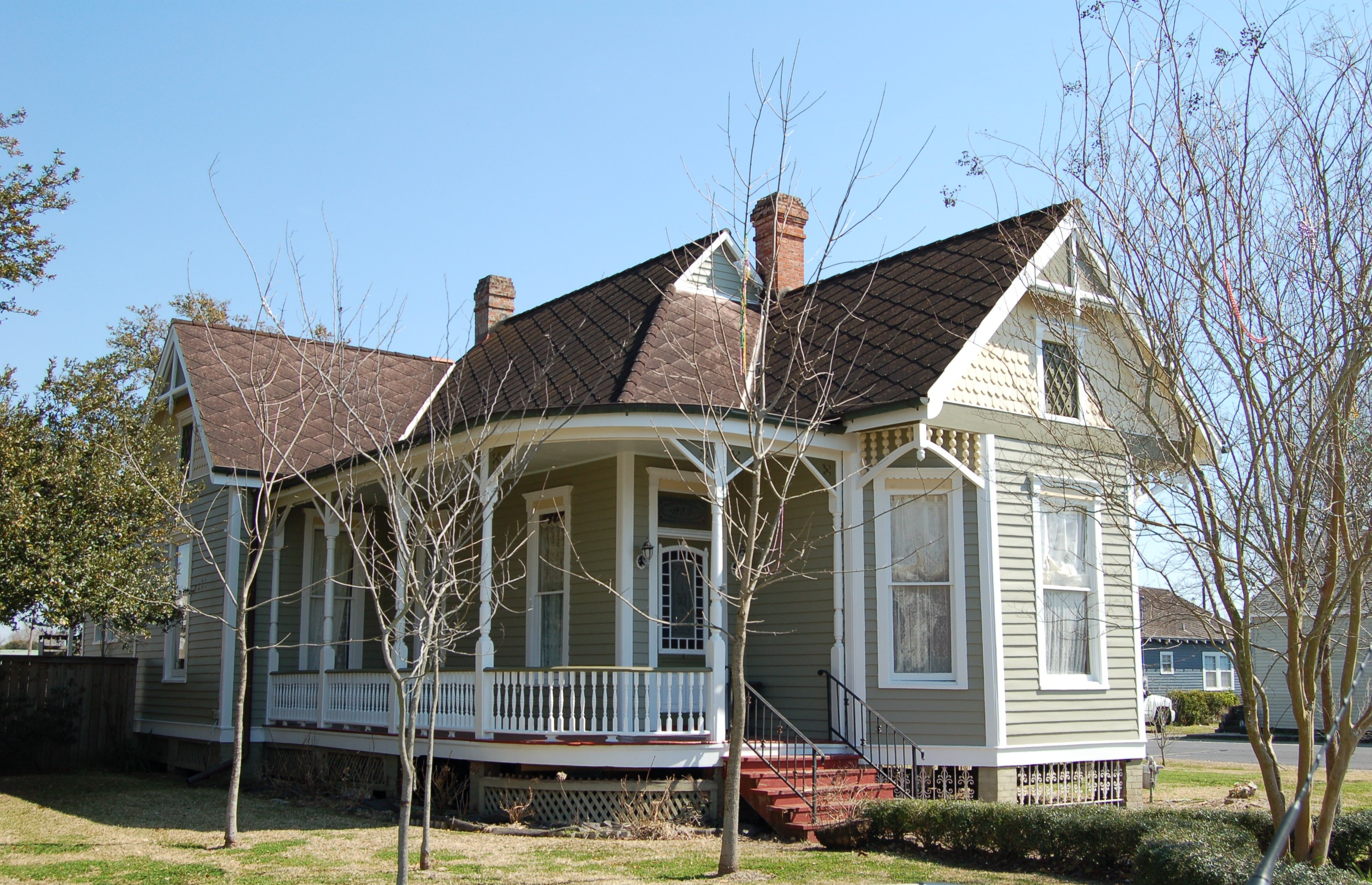

- Location within Louisiana Location within the United States
- Location: 923 Jackson Street, Thibodaux, Louisiana
- Coordinates: 29°47′28″N 90°49′21″W
- Area: less than one acre
- Built: 1892
- Architectural style: Queen Anne Revival, Stick-Eastlake
- NRHP reference No.: 09000517
- Added to NRHP: July 15, 2009

Vives House is a historic house located at 923 Jackson Street in Thibodaux, Louisiana.

Built in 1892, the house is a one-story frame cottage in Queen Anne Revival style with some Stick-Eastlake details.

The house was added to the National Register of Historic Places on July 15, 2009.

== See also ==
- National Register of Historic Places listings in Lafourche Parish, Louisiana
