= Lefort House =

Historic house in Louisiana, United States

- U.S. National Register of Historic Places
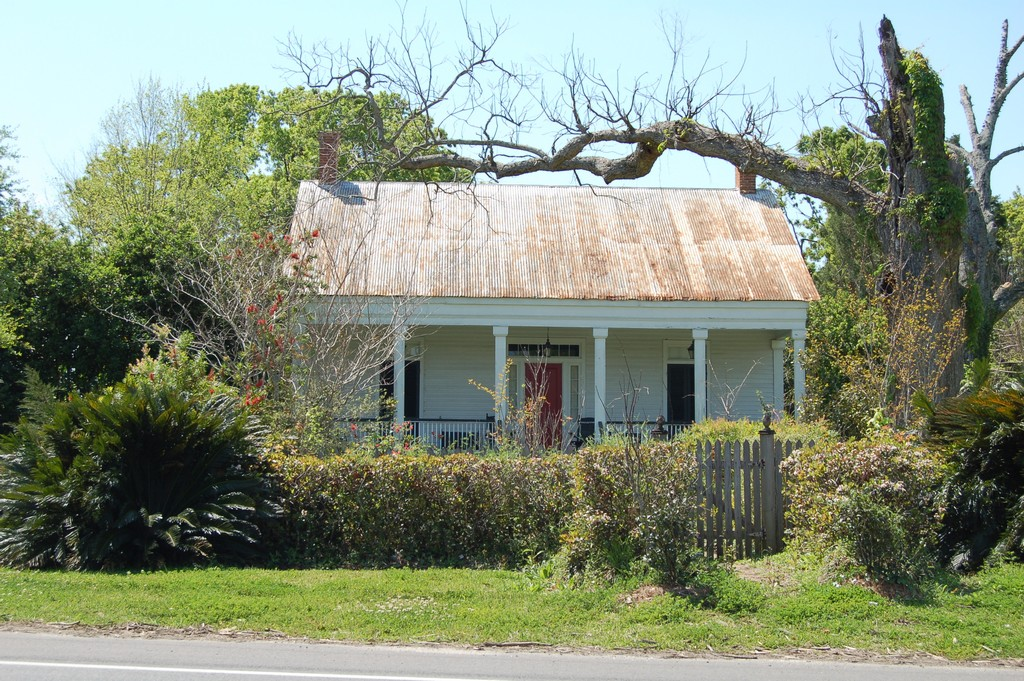

- Location within Louisiana Location within the United States
- Location: 1302 LA 1, Raceland
- Coordinates: 29°45′57″N 90°45′55″W
- Area: 1.9 acres (0.77 ha)
- Built: c.1855
- Architectural style: Greek Revival
- NRHP reference No.: 08000843
- Added to NRHP: September 4, 2008

Lefort House, also known as Omega House, is a historic residence located at 1302 LA 1, in Thibodaux, Louisiana.

The structure is a 1 1/2-story Greek Revival raised-frame cottage immediately adjacent to Southern Pacific Railroad line. The original building was a small cottage built in c.1840 by the Boutary family, which was then connected to a larger Greek Revival structure in c.1855 by Pierce Lefort, after the property was purchased at a sheriff's sale.

The house was added to the National Register of Historic Places on September 4, 2008.

== See also ==
- National Register of Historic Places listings in Lafourche Parish, Louisiana
