= Citizens Bank of Lafourche =

- U.S. National Register of Historic Places
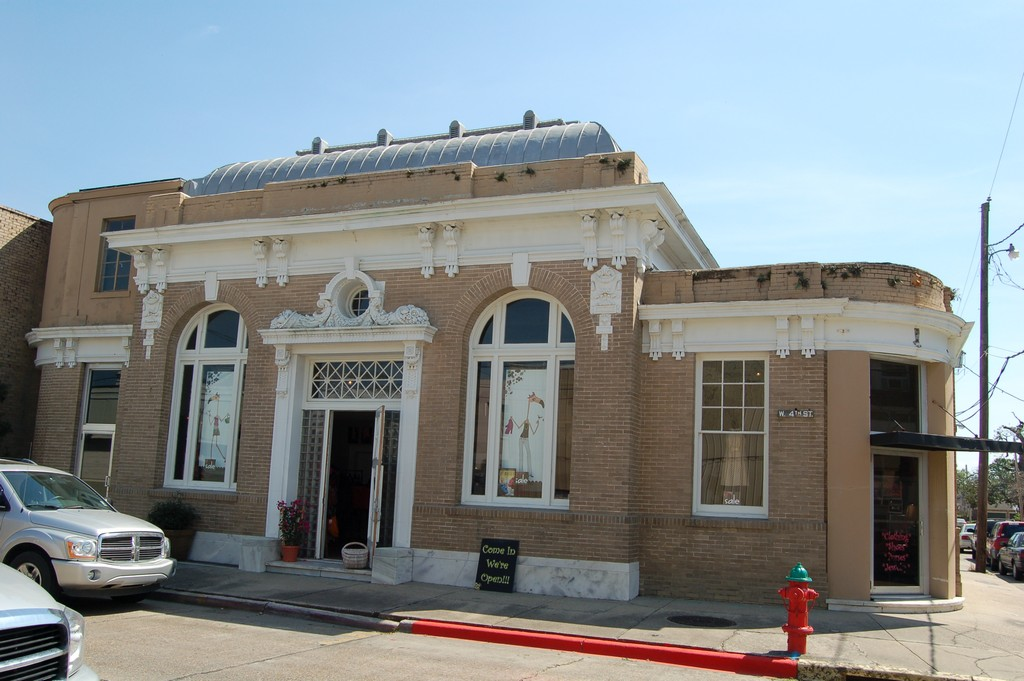

- Location within Louisiana Location within the United States
- Location: 413 West 4th Street, Thibodaux, Louisiana
- Coordinates: 29°47′49″N 90°49′16″W
- Built: 1910
- Built by: Joseph A. Robichaux
- Architectural style: Beux-Arts
- MPS: Thibodaux MRA
- NRHP reference No.: 86000427
- Added to NRHP: March 5, 1986

The Citizens Bank of Lafourche, also known as the Citizens Finance Corporate Building, is a historic commercial building located at 413 West 4th Street in Thibodaux, Louisiana.

Built in 1910, the building is a single-story brick commercial building in Beux-Arts style. The hall is surmounted by a rectangular domical vault with a stained glass lantern. A second story has been added to one of the side wings, without affecting the overall architectural significance.

The building was listed on the National Register of Historic Places on March 5, 1986.

It is one of 14 individually NRHP-listed properties in the "Thibodaux Multiple Resource Area", which also includes:

- Bank of Lafourche Building
- Breaux House
- Building at 108 Green Street
- Chanticleer Gift Shop
- Grand Theatre
- Lamartina Building
- McCulla House
- Peltier House
- Percy-Lobdell Building
- Riviere Building
- Riviere House
- Robichaux House
- St. Joseph Co-Cathedral and Rectory

== See also ==
- National Register of Historic Places listings in Lafourche Parish, Louisiana
