= Frost House (Thibodaux, Louisiana) =

Historic house in Louisiana, United States

- U.S. National Register of Historic Places
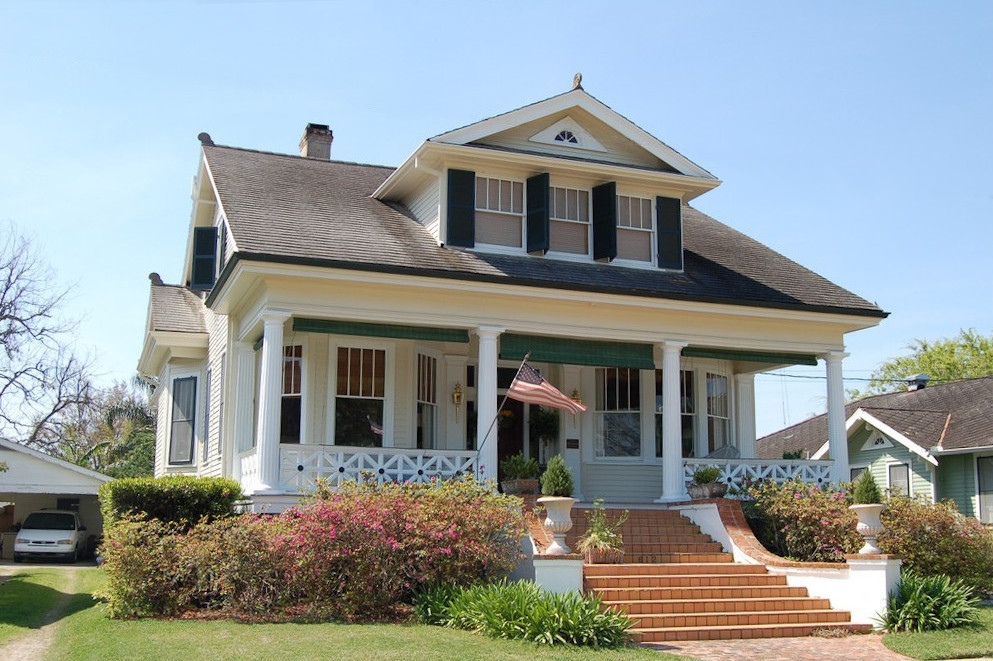

- Location within Louisiana Location within the United States
- Location: 612 St. Philip Street, Thibodaux, Louisiana
- Coordinates: 29°47′41″N 90°49′17″W
- Area: less than one acre
- Built: c.1916
- Architectural style: Colonial Revival
- NRHP reference No.: 08000766
- Added to NRHP: August 6, 2008

Frost House is a historic house located at 612 St. Philip Street in Thibodaux.

Originally built in 1912 for H.W. Frost as a three-story structure, the building was reduced to its present form in c.1916 by Mrs. Frost, which inherited the house after her husband death. It's a one-and-one-half story Colonial Revival frame residence raised on tall brick piers.

The house was added to the National Register of Historic Places on August 6, 2008.

== See also ==
- National Register of Historic Places listings in Lafourche Parish, Louisiana
