= Bank of Lafourche Building =

- U.S. National Register of Historic Places
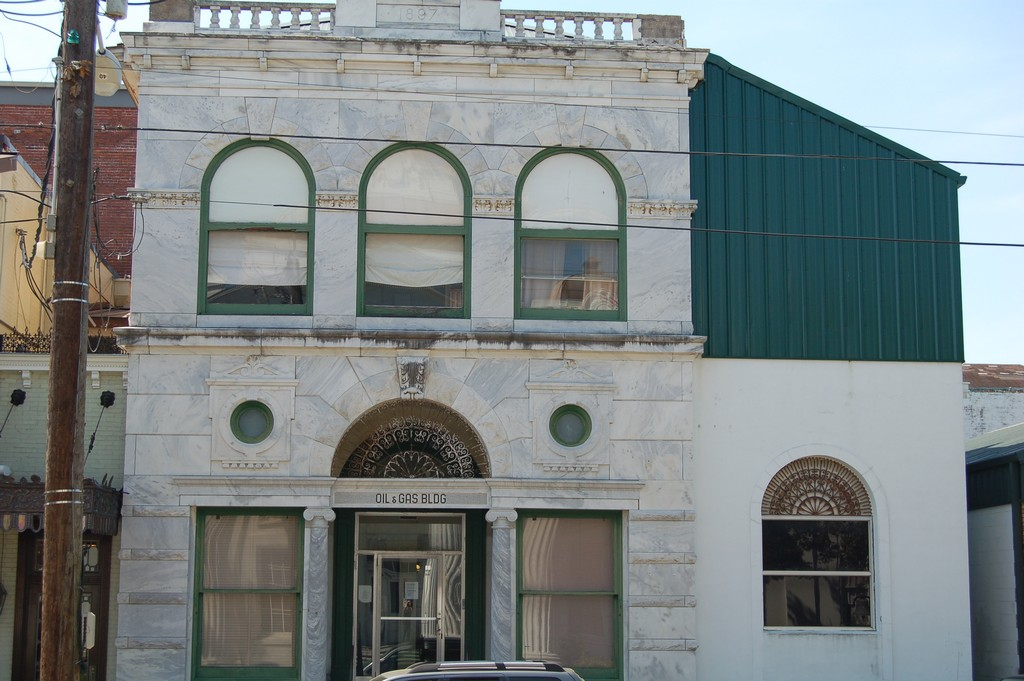

- Location within Louisiana Location within the United States
- Location: 206 Green Street, Thibodaux, Louisiana
- Coordinates: 29°47′52″N 90°49′13″W
- Built: 1897
- Architectural style: Italianate
- MPS: Thibodaux MRA
- NRHP reference No.: 86000425
- Added to NRHP: March 5, 1986

The Bank of Lafourche Building, also known as the Oil & Gas Building, is a historic commercial building located at 206 Green Street in Thibodaux, Louisiana, United States.

Built in 1897, the building is a two-story brick Italianate style commercial building with marble facade. It was used as a bank until 1929.

The building was listed on the National Register of Historic Places on March 5, 1986.

It is one of 14 individually NRHP-listed properties in the "Thibodaux Multiple Resource Area", which also includes:

- Breaux House
- Building at 108 Green Street
- Chanticleer Gift Shop
- Citizens Bank of Lafourche
- Grand Theatre
- Lamartina Building
- McCulla House
- Peltier House
- Percy-Lobdell Building
- Riviere Building
- Riviere House
- Robichaux House
- St. Joseph Co-Cathedral and Rectory

== See also ==
- National Register of Historic Places listings in Lafourche Parish, Louisiana
