= Bank of Lockport =

- U.S. National Register of Historic Places
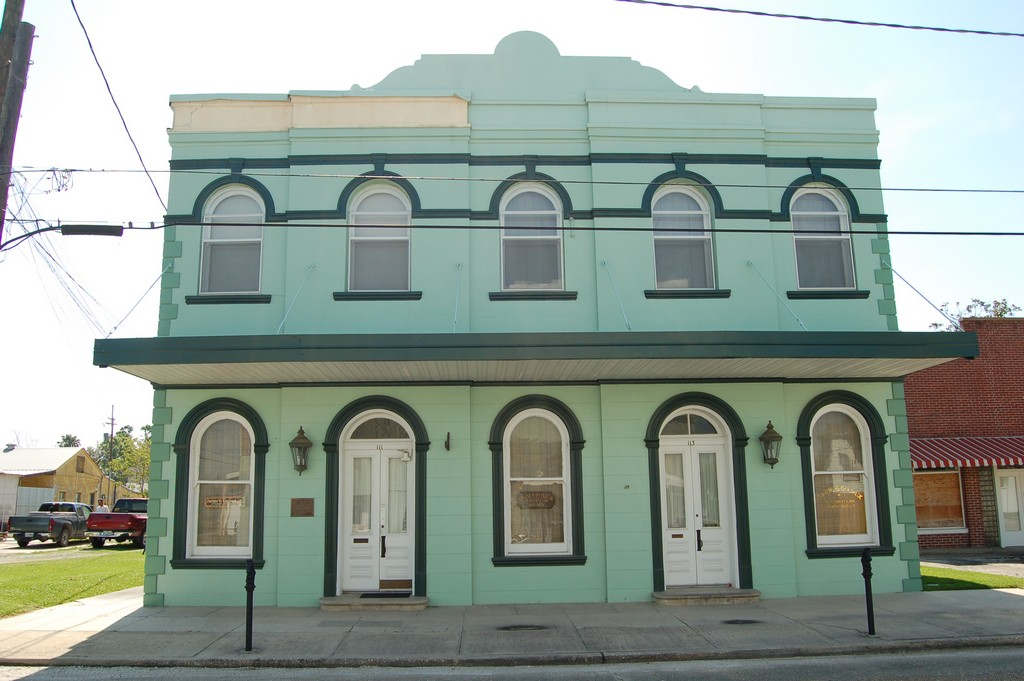

- Location within Louisiana Location within the United States
- Location: 111-113 Barataria Street, Lockport, Louisiana
- Coordinates: 29°38′47″N 90°32′17″W
- Area: less than one acre
- Built: 1901
- Architectural style: Romanesque Revival
- NRHP reference No.: 95000299
- Added to NRHP: March 30, 1995

The Bank of Lockport, also known as the Gouaux Building, is a historic commercial building located at 111-113 Barataria Street in Lockport, Louisiana, United States.

Built in 1901 in Romanesque Revival style, the masonry building was originally constructed as a one-story structure, and was expanded with the addition of a second story, in the same style, in 1910. The Bank of Lockport failed at some point after 1910. A second bank, known as the Farmer's Bank and Trust Company, occupied the building until it also failed in 1930s. The building then hosted the Lockport post office until 1943, when the building was purchased by Gouaux family and was used as a law office by Eugene Gouaux.

The building was listed on the National Register of Historic Places on March 30, 1995.

== See also ==
- National Register of Historic Places listings in Lafourche Parish, Louisiana
