= Dansereau House =

Historic house in Louisiana, United States

- U.S. National Register of Historic Places
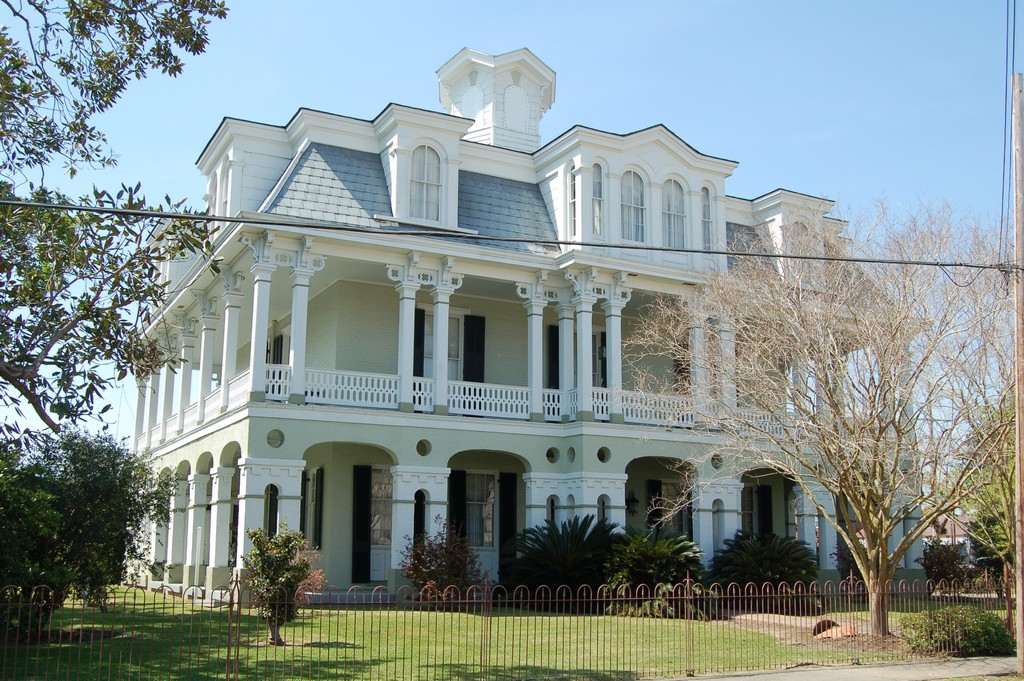

- Location within Louisiana Location within the United States
- Location: 506 St. Philip Street, Thibodaux, Louisiana
- Coordinates: 29°47′46″N 90°49′17″W
- Area: 1.3 acres (0.53 ha)
- Built: 1845
- Built by: Dr. James Scudday
- Architect: Henri Thiberge
- Architectural style: Second Empire, Italianate
- NRHP reference No.: 78001425
- Added to NRHP: November 21, 1978

The Dansereau House, also known as the Caldwell Home, is a historic mansion located at 506 St. Philip Street in Thibodaux, Louisiana.

The first floor was built in 1845–47 for James A. Scudday. It was purchased by Canadians, the Dansereau family, after the American Civil War of 1861–1865. A second floor was added for its new owner, Dr Hercules Dansereau, in 1875. The house was repurposed as a bed and breakfast by its owner, Democratic Representative Damon Baldone, in 2010.

The property was designed by architect Henri Thiberge in the Italianate style, with a Second Empire roof. It has been listed on the National Register of Historic Places since November 21, 1978.

== See also ==
- National Register of Historic Places listings in Lafourche Parish, Louisiana
