= Grand Theatre (Thibodaux, Louisiana) =

- U.S. National Register of Historic Places
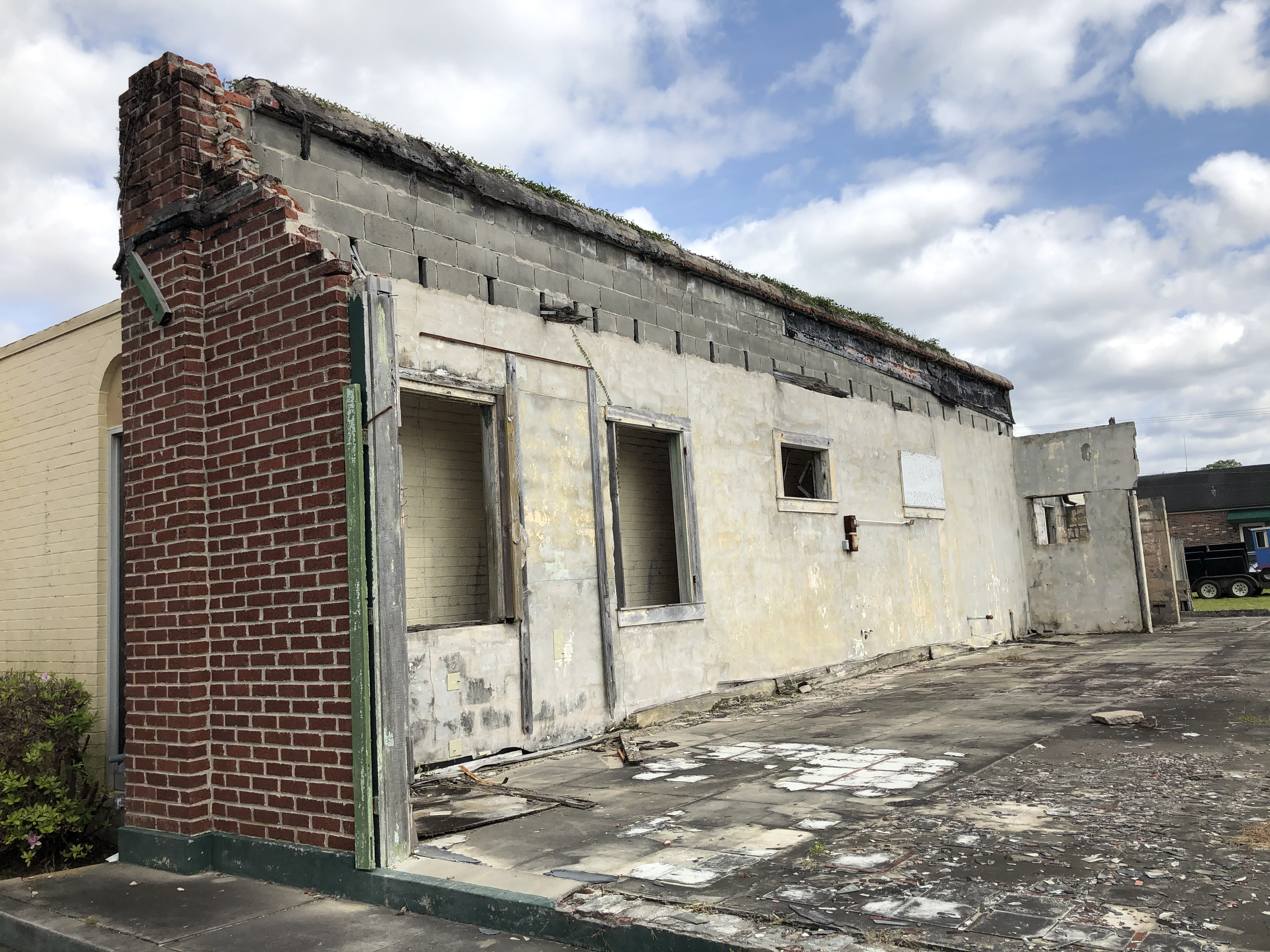
- Remains of the theater

- Location within Louisiana Location within the United States
- Location: 401 Green Street, Thibodaux, Louisiana
- Coordinates: 29°47′49″N 90°49′11″W
- Built: 1920s
- Architectural style: Classical Revival
- Demolished: June 1995
- MPS: Thibodaux MRA
- NRHP reference No.: 86000428
- Added to NRHP: March 5, 1986

The Grand Theatre was a historic theatre building located at 401 Green Street in Thibodaux, Louisiana.

Built in the 1920s, the building was a two-story Classical Revival commercial building with a pilastered front. It had a large open auditorium with a second story gallery over the lobby. The building was already vacant at the time of National Register submission in 1986.

It was demolished to make space for a parking lot in June 1995.

The building was listed on the National Register of Historic Places on March 5, 1986.

It was one of 14 individually NRHP-listed properties in the "Thibodaux Multiple Resource Area", which also includes:

- Bank of Lafourche Building
- Breaux House
- Building at 108 Green Street
- Chanticleer Gift Shop
- Citizens Bank of Lafourche
- Lamartina Building
- McCulla House
- Peltier House
- Percy-Lobdell Building
- Riviere Building
- Riviere House
- Robichaux House
- St. Joseph Co-Cathedral and Rectory

== See also ==
- National Register of Historic Places listings in Lafourche Parish, Louisiana
