= Building at 108 Green Street =

- U.S. National Register of Historic Places
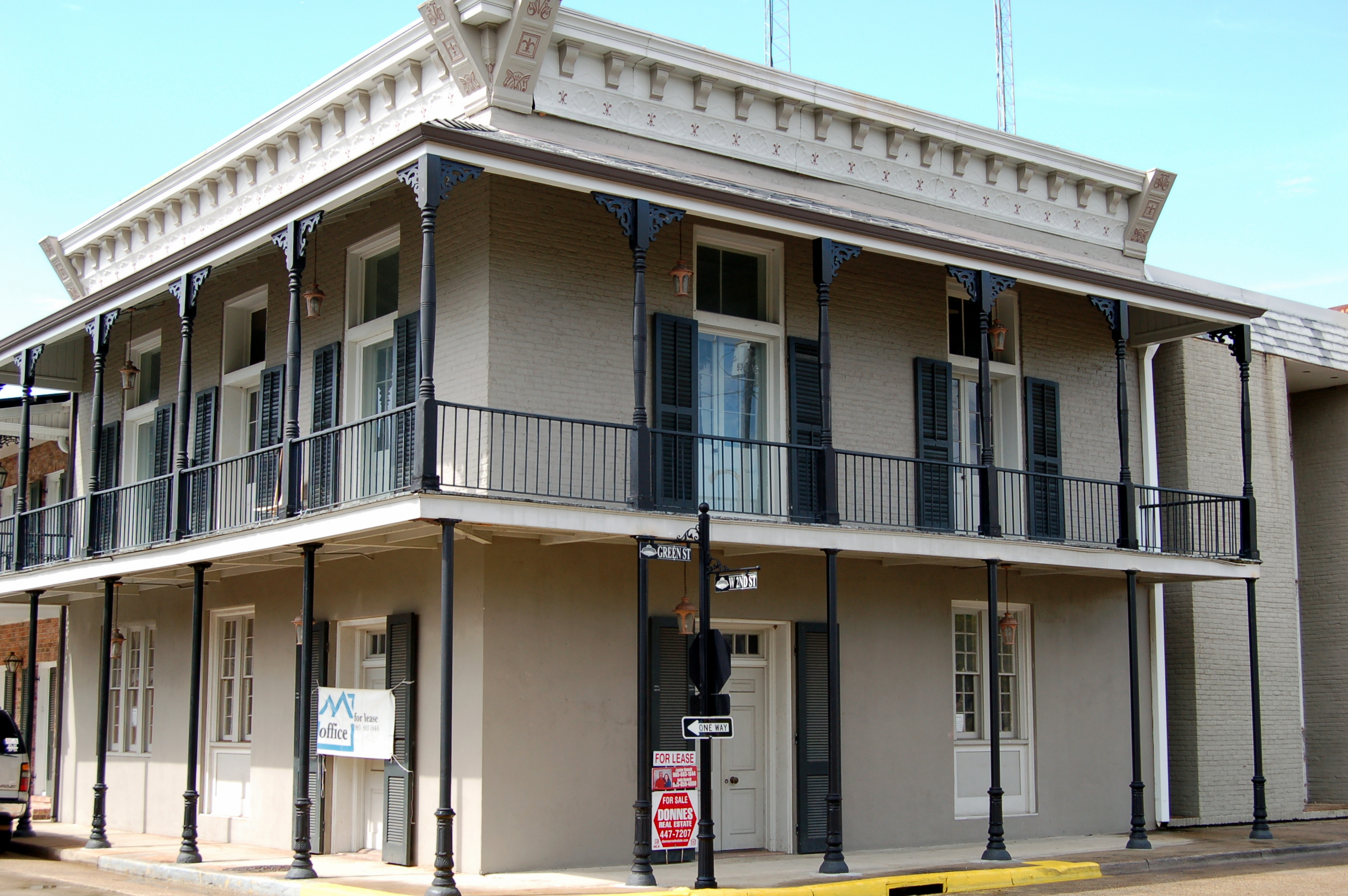

- Location within Louisiana Location within the United States
- Location: 108 Green Street, Thibodaux, Louisiana
- Coordinates: 29°47′53″N 90°49′13″W
- Built: c.1900
- Architectural style: Eastlake
- MPS: Thibodaux MRA
- NRHP reference No.: 86000424
- Added to NRHP: March 5, 1986

The Building at 108 Green Street, also known as the KTIB Radio Building, is a historic commercial building located at 108 Green Street in Thibodaux, Louisiana.

Built in c.1900, the structure is a two-story brick commercial building with an Eastlake gallery on two sides. Lower gallery is cast-iron, while upper gallery has wooden columns.

The building was listed on the National Register of Historic Places on March 5, 1986.

It is one of 14 individually NRHP-listed properties in the "Thibodaux Multiple Resource Area", which also includes:

- Bank of Lafourche Building
- Breaux House
- Chanticleer Gift Shop
- Citizens Bank of Lafourche
- Grand Theatre
- Lamartina Building
- McCulla House
- Peltier House
- Percy-Lobdell Building
- Riviere Building
- Riviere House
- Robichaux House
- St. Joseph Co-Cathedral and Rectory

== See also ==
- KTIB
- National Register of Historic Places listings in Lafourche Parish, Louisiana
