= Percy-Lobdell Building =

- U.S. National Register of Historic Places
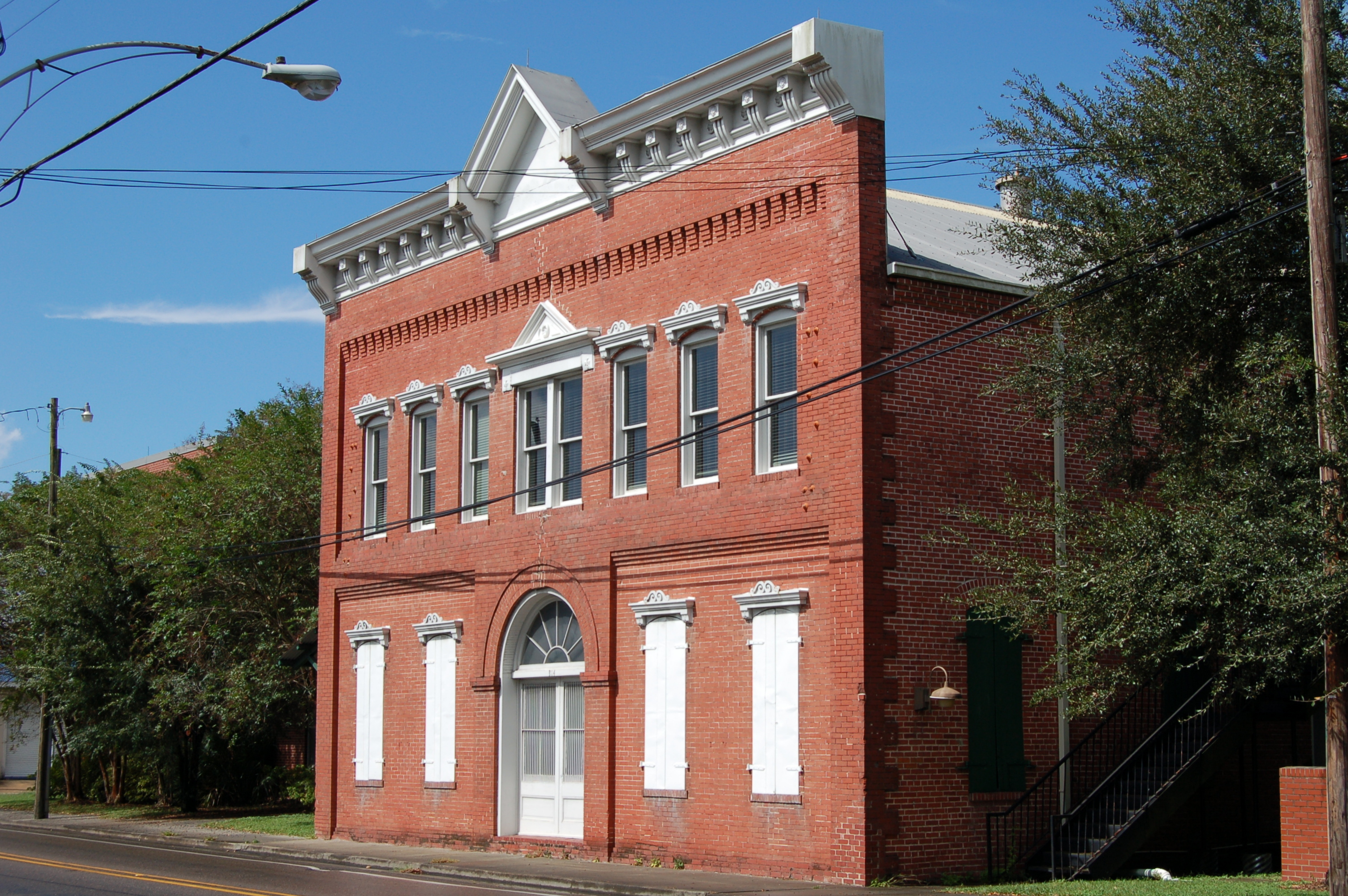

- Location within Louisiana Location within the United States
- Location: 314 St. Mary Street, Thibodaux, Louisiana
- Coordinates: 29°47′46″N 90°49′30″W
- Built: c.1900
- Architectural style: Italianate
- MPS: Thibodaux MRA
- NRHP reference No.: 86000431
- Added to NRHP: March 5, 1986

The Percy-Lobdell Building is a historic warehouse located at 314 St. Mary Street in Thibodaux, Louisiana, United States.

Built in c.1900, the structure is a two-story brick Italianate style warehouse with a monumental false front five bays wide. The building is home to the Wetlands Acadian Cultural Center of Jean Lafitte National Historic Park, and also hosts the Martha Sowell Utley Memorial Branch of the Lafourche Parish Library.

The building was listed on the National Register of Historic Places on March 5, 1986.

It is one of 14 individually NRHP-listed properties in the "Thibodaux Multiple Resource Area", which also includes:

- Bank of Lafourche Building
- Breaux House
- Building at 108 Green Street
- Chanticleer Gift Shop
- Citizens Bank of Lafourche
- Grand Theatre
- Lamartina Building
- McCulla House
- Peltier House
- Riviere Building
- Riviere House
- Robichaux House
- St. Joseph Co-Cathedral and Rectory

== See also ==
- National Register of Historic Places listings in Lafourche Parish, Louisiana
