= Riviere House =

Historic house in Louisiana, United States

- U.S. National Register of Historic Places
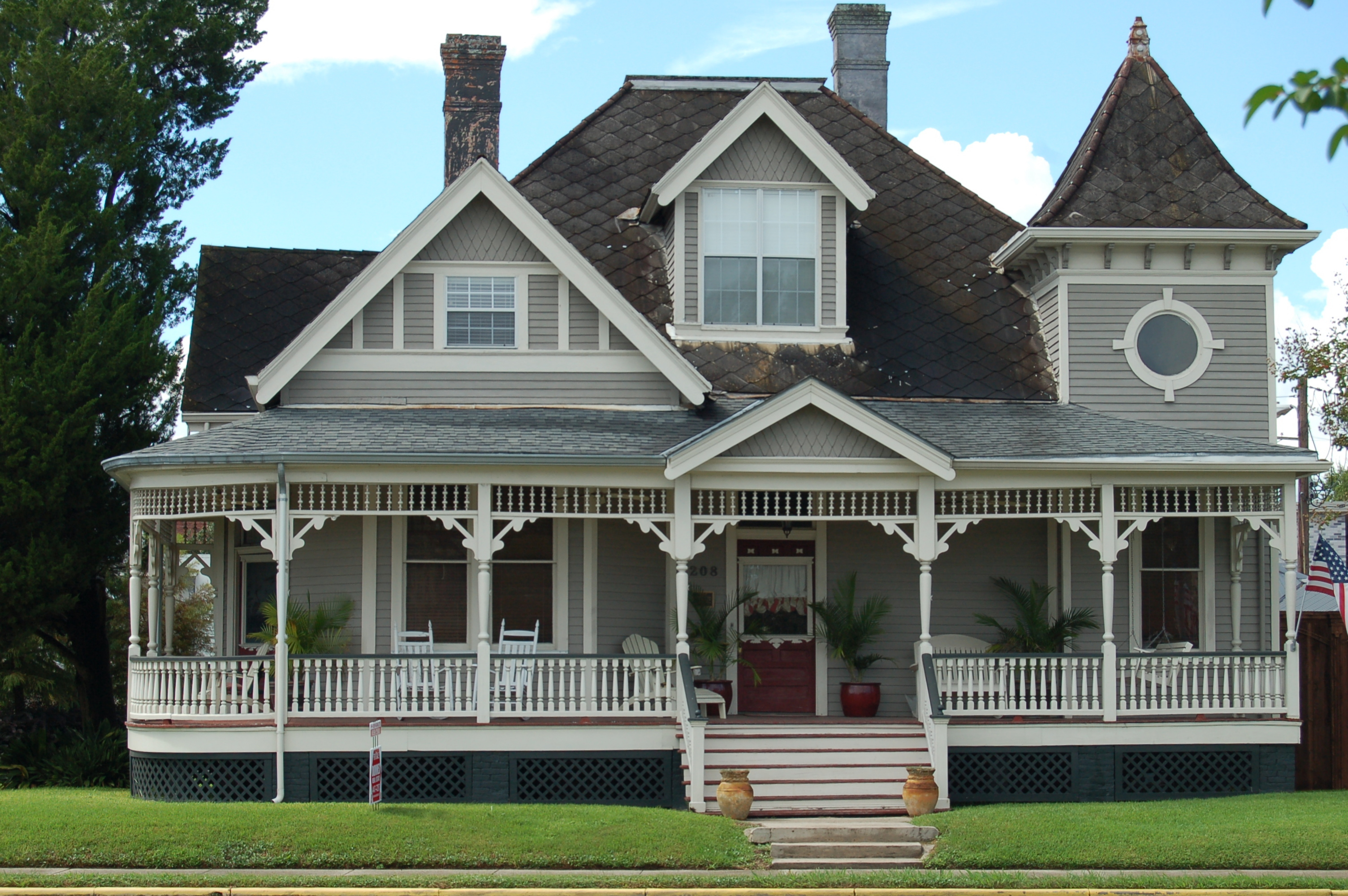

- Location within Louisiana Location within the United States
- Location: 208 Canal Boulevard, Thibodaux, Louisiana
- Coordinates: 29°47′52″N 90°49′07″W
- Built: 1900
- Built by: Henry Riviere
- Architectural style: Queen Anne Revival, Eastlake
- MPS: Thibodaux MRA
- NRHP reference No.: 86000433
- Added to NRHP: March 5, 1986

The Riviere House is a historic house located at 208 Canal Boulevard in Thibodaux, Louisiana.

Built in 1900, the house is a 1 1/2-story frame residence in Queen Anne Revival style with Eastlake gallery curving around the front and side of the house. The roofline features a square corner turret with an oculus and a pyramidal roof.

The house was listed on the National Register of Historic Places on March 5, 1986.

It is one of 14 individually NRHP-listed properties in the "Thibodaux Multiple Resource Area", which also includes:

- Bank of Lafourche Building
- Breaux House
- Building at 108 Green Street
- Chanticleer Gift Shop
- Citizens Bank of Lafourche
- Grand Theatre
- Lamartina Building
- McCulla House
- Peltier House
- Percy-Lobdell Building
- Riviere Building
- Robichaux House
- St. Joseph Co-Cathedral and Rectory

== See also ==
- National Register of Historic Places listings in Lafourche Parish, Louisiana
