= Chatchie Plantation House =

Historic house in Louisiana, United States

- U.S. National Register of Historic Places
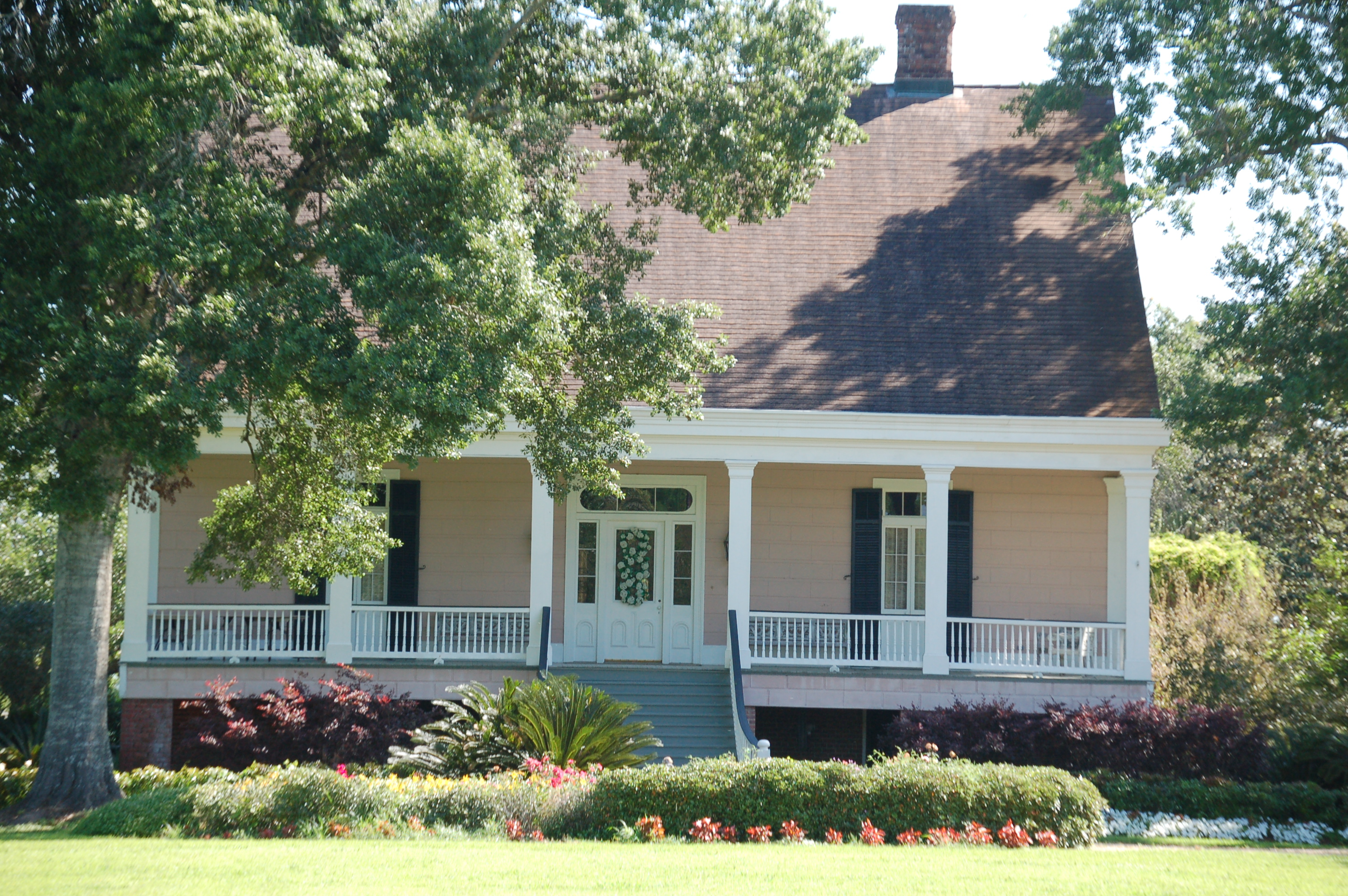

- Location within Louisiana Location within the United States
- Location: Along LA 308, about 3.6 miles (5.8 km) east of Thibodaux
- Nearest city: Thibodaux, Louisiana
- Coordinates: 29°46′27″N 90°46′04″W
- Area: 0.16 acres (0.065 ha)
- Built: c.1868
- Architect: Justin F. Gaude
- NRHP reference No.: 82000442
- Added to NRHP: October 25, 1982

Chatchie Plantation House, also known as Homewood, is a historic Louisiana plantation house located along LA 308, about 3.6 miles (5.8 km) east of Thibodaux.

The original house, built in 1847, burned near the end of Civil War. The actual structure is a 1 1/2-story fully raised frame house built in c. 1868. The original kitchen, unharmed by fire, was included in the present building. The main gallery has six Doric posts and the house has an unusually large attic space, comprising four rooms and a central hall.

The mansion was added to the National Register of Historic Places on October 25, 1982.

== See also ==
- National Register of Historic Places listings in Lafourche Parish, Louisiana
