= 816 Jackson Street (Thibodaux, Louisiana) =

Historic house in Louisiana, United States

- U.S. National Register of Historic Places
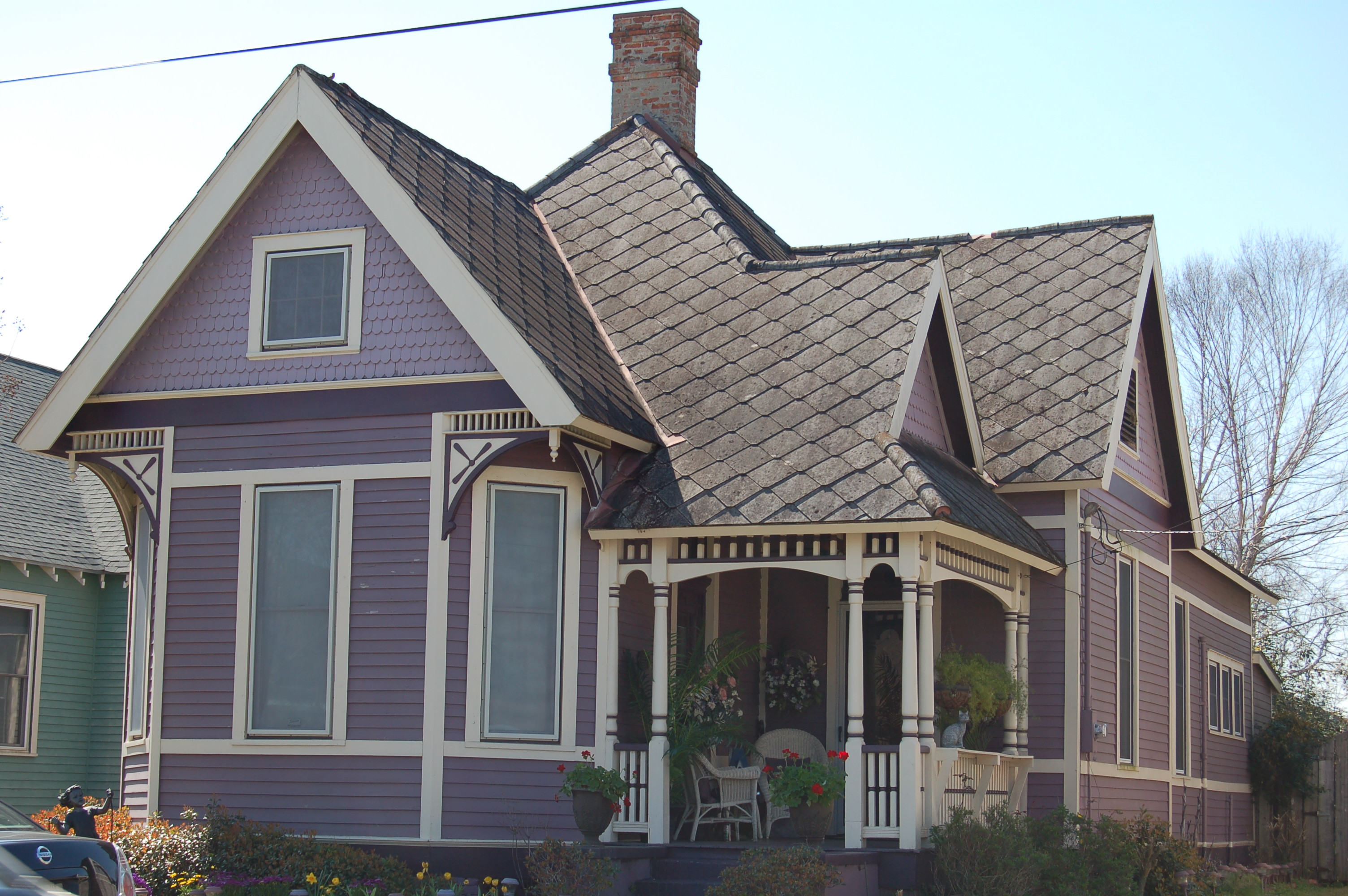

- Location within Louisiana Location within the United States
- Location: 816 Jackson Street, Thibodaux, Louisiana
- Coordinates: 29°47′34″N 90°49′23″W
- Area: less than one acre
- Built: c.1895
- Architectural style: Queen Anne Revival, Stick-Eastlake
- NRHP reference No.: 09000547
- Added to NRHP: July 22, 2009

The house at 816 Jackson Street is a historic residence located in Thibodaux.

== Background ==
Built c. 1895, the structure is a one-story frame cottage in Queen Anne Revival style with Stick–Eastlake details. Despite having been altered on the rear, the facade and much of side elevations are original.

The house was added to the National Register of Historic Places on July 22, 2009.

== See also ==
- National Register of Historic Places listings in Lafourche Parish, Louisiana
