= Zephirin Toups Sr. House =

Historic house in Louisiana, United States

- U.S. National Register of Historic Places
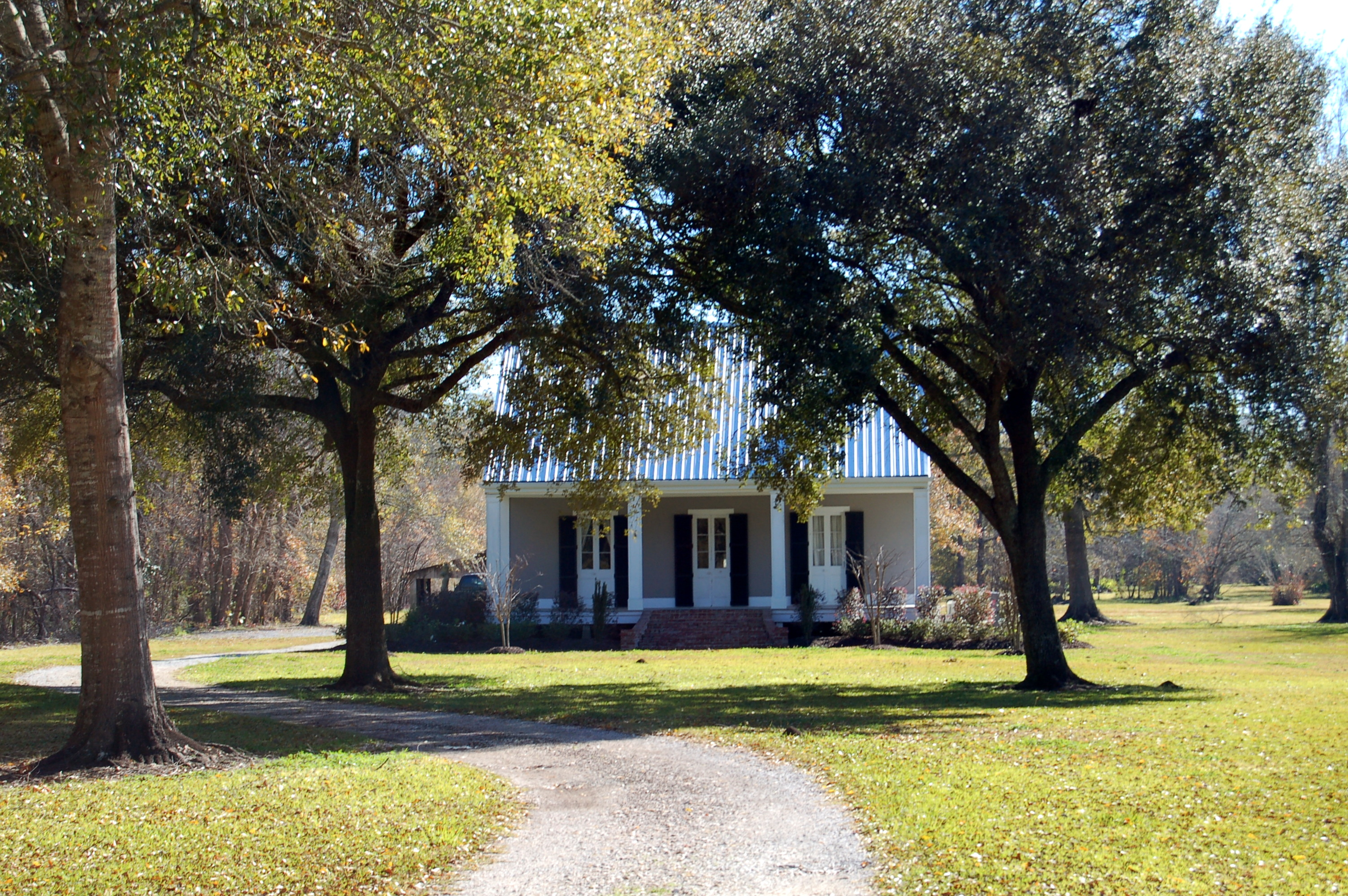

- Location within Louisiana Location within the United States
- Location: Along Bayou Blue Bypass Road, about 5.9 miles (9.5 km) southeast of Thibodaux, Louisiana
- Coordinates: 29°43′26″N 90°46′14″W
- Area: 1 acre (0.40 ha)
- Built: 1866
- Architectural style: French Creole, Greek Revival
- MPS: Louisiana's French Creole Architecture MPS
- NRHP reference No.: 93000820
- Added to NRHP: August 12, 1993

Zephirin Toups Sr. House is a historic house located along Bayou Blue Bypass Road, about 5.9 miles (9.5 km) southeast of Thibodaux, Louisiana.

Built in 1866, the house is a 1 1/2-story frame residence in French Creole style with some Greek Revival decorative details. The house was originally located along Bayou Lafourche, on LA 308, between Thibodaux and Raceland. The house was threatened with demolition in 1974, was purchased by a descendant of Zephirin Toups and moved to its present location.

The house was added to the National Register of Historic Places on August 12, 1993.

== See also ==
- National Register of Historic Places listings in Lafourche Parish, Louisiana
