= Merchants and Planters Bank (Lockport, Louisiana) =

- U.S. National Register of Historic Places
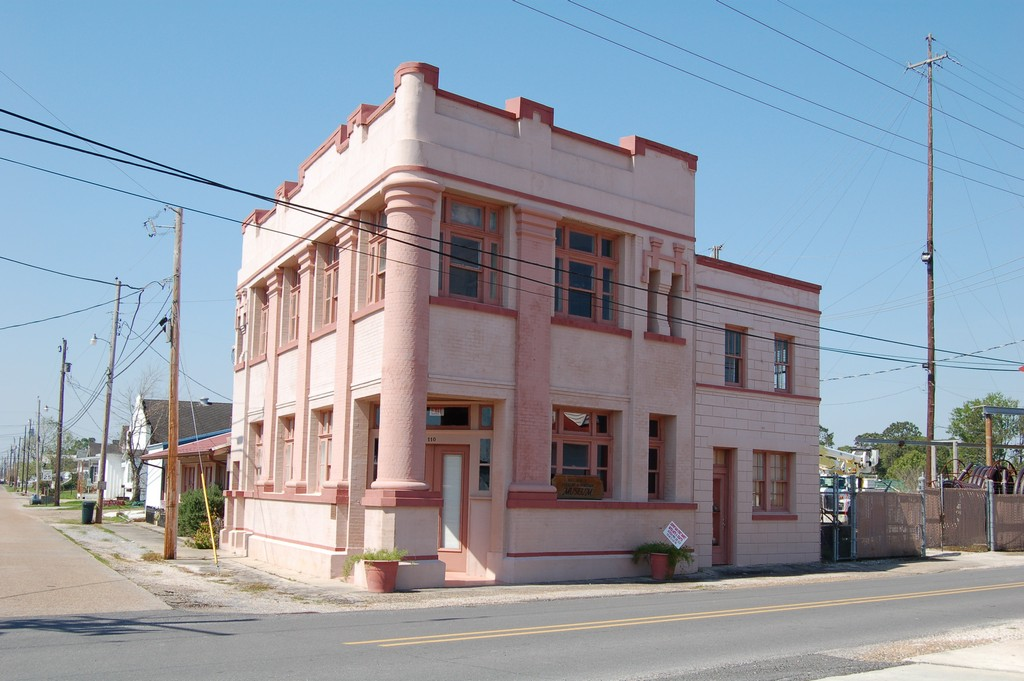

- Location within Louisiana Location within the United States
- Location: 110 Main Street, Lockport, Louisiana
- Coordinates: 29°38′50″N 90°32′20″W
- Area: less than one acre
- Built: 1910
- Architectural style: Classical Revival
- NRHP reference No.: 95000297
- Added to NRHP: March 30, 1995

The Merchants and Planters Bank, also known as the Old LP&L District Office Building and now hosting the Bayou LaFourche Folklife and Heritage Museum, is a historic bank building located at 110 Main Street in Lockport, Louisiana.

Built in 1910, the two-story masonry structure in Classical Revival style is one of the oldest extant buildings in downtown Lockport as it survived the 1916 Lockport fire.

The building was listed on the National Register of Historic Places on March 30, 1995.

== See also ==
- National Register of Historic Places listings in Lafourche Parish, Louisiana
