= St. Joseph Co-Cathedral (Thibodaux, Louisiana) =

Historic church in Louisiana, United States

- Saint Joseph’s Co-Cathedral and Rectory
- U.S. National Register of Historic Places
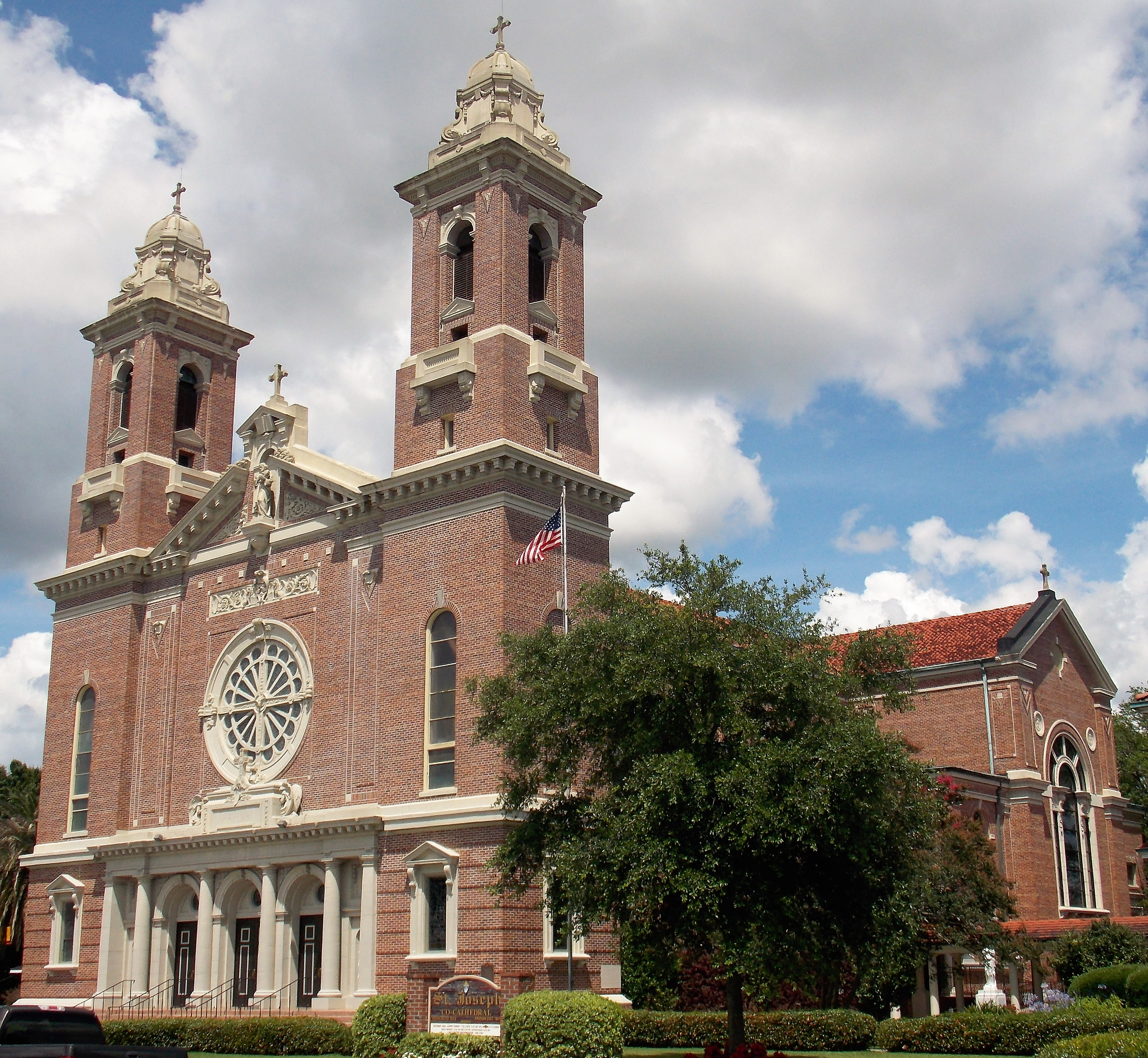

- Location within Louisiana Location within the United States
- Location: 721 Canal Boulevard, Thibodaux, Louisiana
- Coordinates: 29°47′37″N 90°49′10″W
- Built: 1923
- Architect: Joseph A. Robichaux
- Architectural style: Renaissance Revival
- MPS: Thibodaux MRA
- NRHP reference No.: 86000435
- Added to NRHP: March 5, 1986

St. Joseph Co-Cathedral is a Catholic cathedral located in Thibodaux, Louisiana, United States. Along with the Cathedral of St. Francis de Sales in Houma it is the seat of the Diocese of Houma-Thibodaux. It is also the oldest parish in the diocese.

The church building and rectory were listed on the National Register of Historic Places as Saint Joseph's Co-Cathedral and Rectory on March 5, 1986 as part of the "Thibodaux Multiple Resource Area".

== History ==
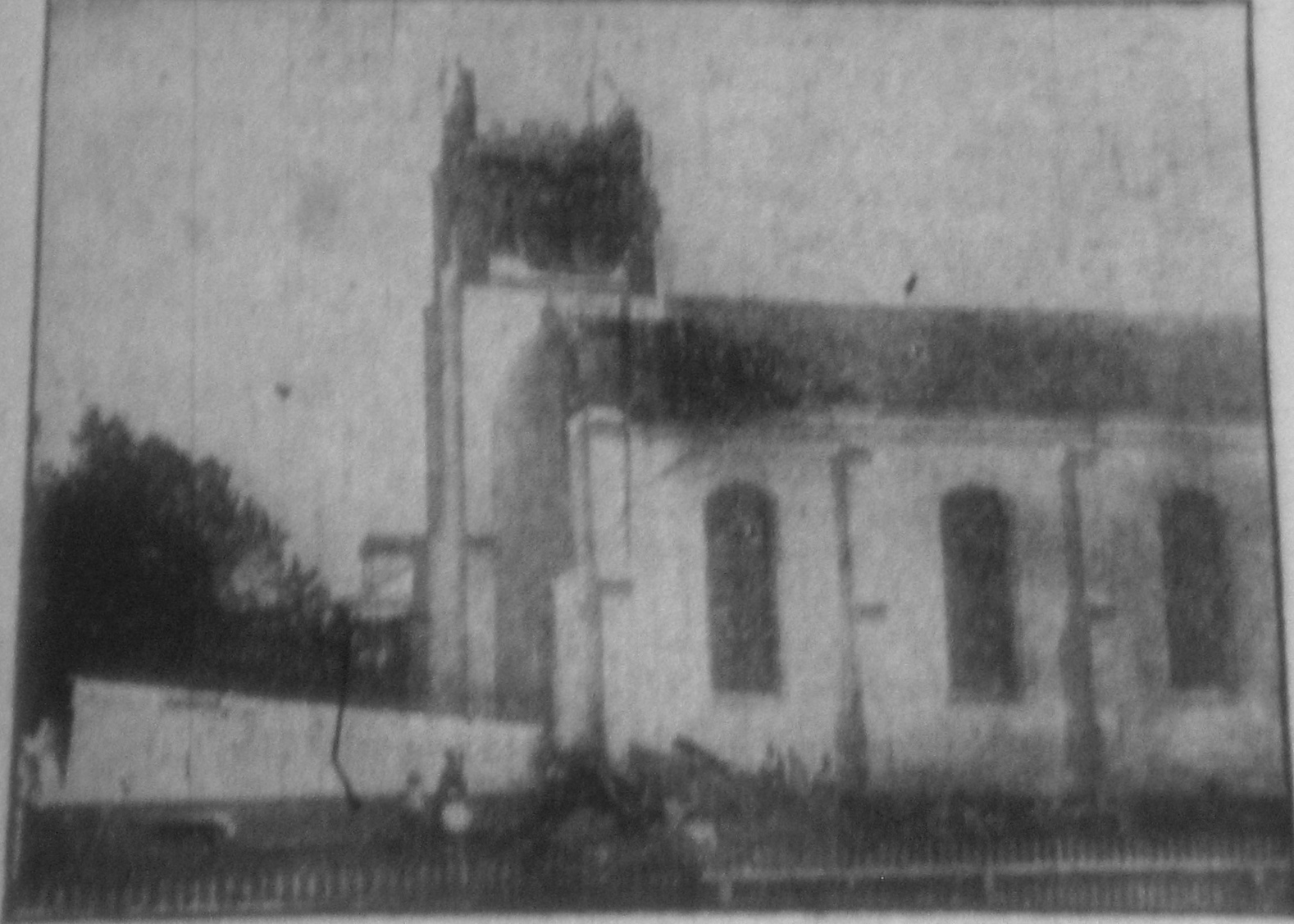
The 1849 church damaged by the 1909 Grand Isle hurricane

St. Joseph Parish first began to organize in 1813 and was founded as a mission to Assumption Church in Plattenville in 1817. Two years later a small wooden church building was constructed near the current church cemetery. The Rev. Antoine Potini was assigned as St. Joseph's first pastor. It is the oldest Catholic parish in the diocese and many of the other churches were founded from it and served by its priest. The Rev. Charles Menard had a brick church built in 1849, but it was destroyed by a fire in 1916. The relics of Saint Valerie survived the fire and are in the current church in a glass sarcophagus. The present church was begun in 1920 during the pastorate of Msgr. Alexander Barbier. It was completed three years later in the Renaissance Revival style. The first Mass was celebrated on January 25, 1923. The ornamental marble and plaster work was added in 1931 and the final paint scheme was done in 1954.

Two of the parishes that were created from St. Joseph include St. Genevieve Parish, that was established in 1959, and St. Thomas Aquinas Parish in 1970.

On March 2, 1977 Pope Paul VI established the Diocese of Houma-Thibodaux. St. Francis de Sales Church in Houma became the cathedral of the new diocese and St. Joseph Church in Thibodaux became the co-cathedral.

St. Joseph Life Center was built in 1985 to house the parish's administrative offices and community center. A major restoration of the co-cathedral church was completed in 2005.

== Architecture ==
The exterior of St. Joseph Co-Cathedral is composed of pressed brick with stone trim. Two twin towers flank the main façade, which features a rose window. The roof is covered in terra cotta tile.

The main feature in the interior is the 34 foot (10.4 m) high Baldachin in the apse. Symbols of the Four Evangelists are carved into its upper edge. The same symbols are found on the columns in the church. On the dome above are found the symbols of the Tree of Knowledge, the Tree of Life, a snake, an apple, and peacocks symbolizing the triumph and glory of the risen Christ. The coat of arms for Pope Pius XI and Archbishop John Shaw of New Orleans are also found there. The stained glass windows portray the life of Christ and the seven Sacraments. A crest appears on all the columns with an emblem of faith, hope, charity and the Ship of Life. They are above a cast of grapes and wheat, which symbolizes the Eucharist.

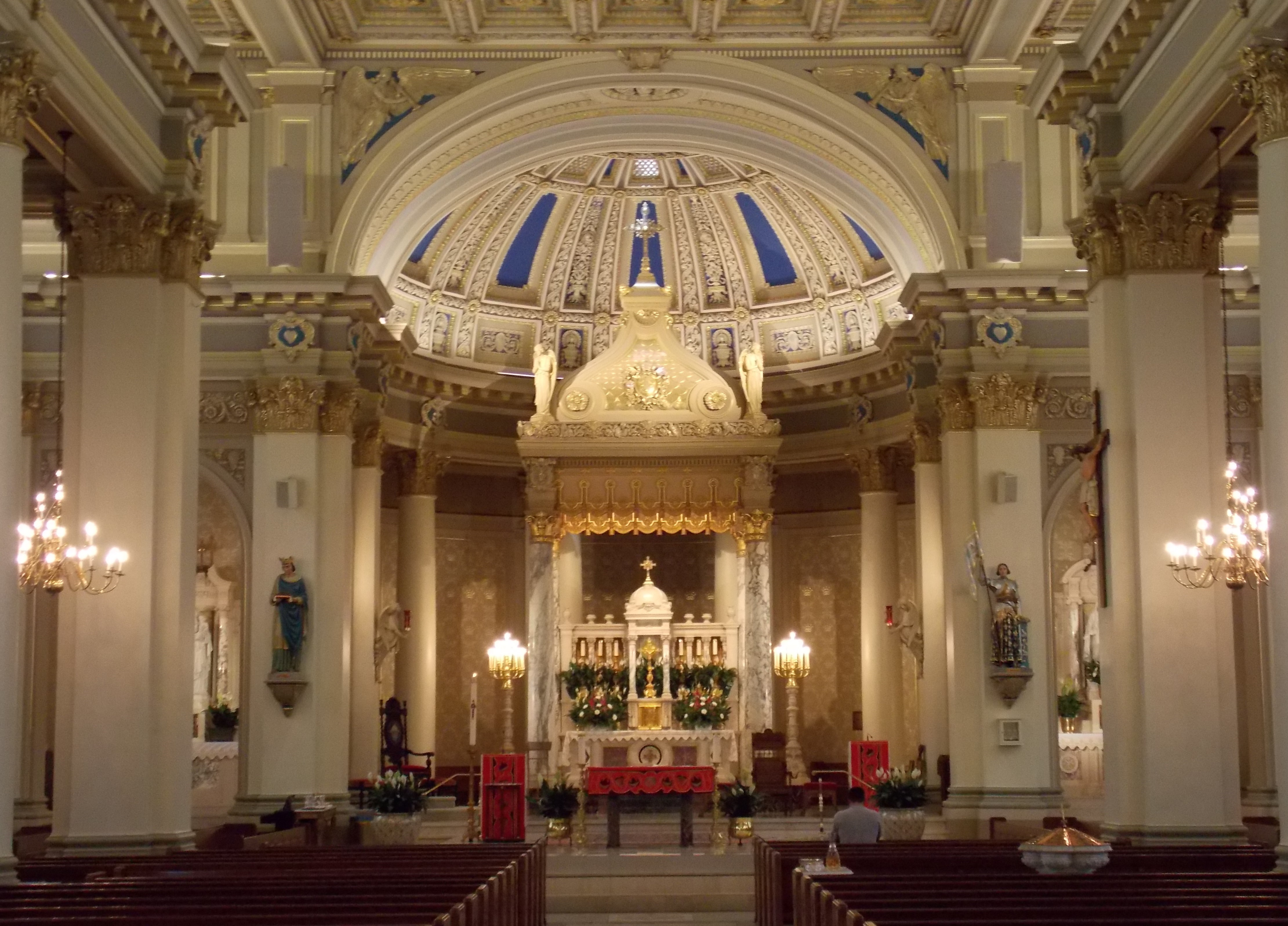
View up the nave toward the sanctuary

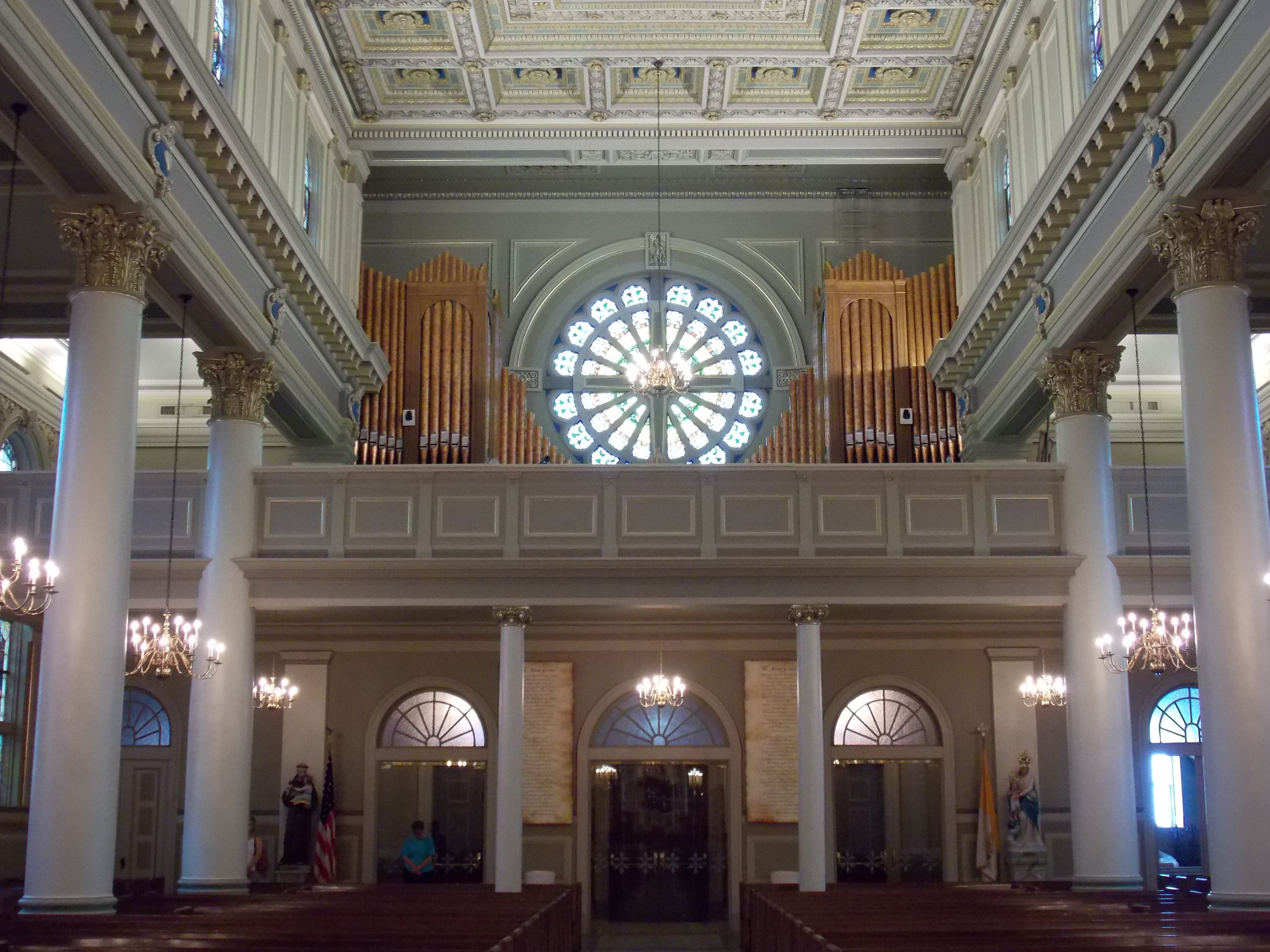
Looking down the nave toward gallery

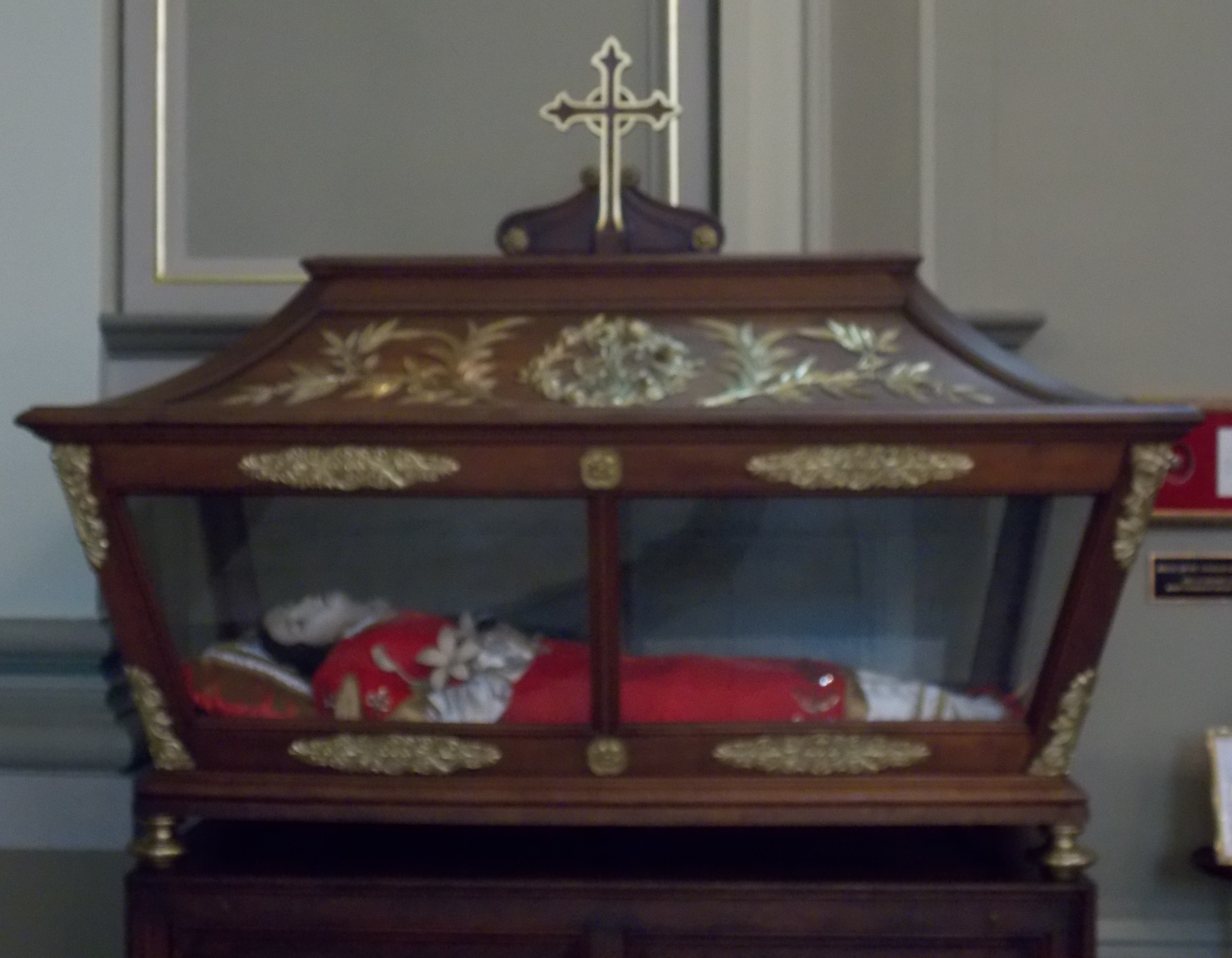
Reliquary of St. Valerie

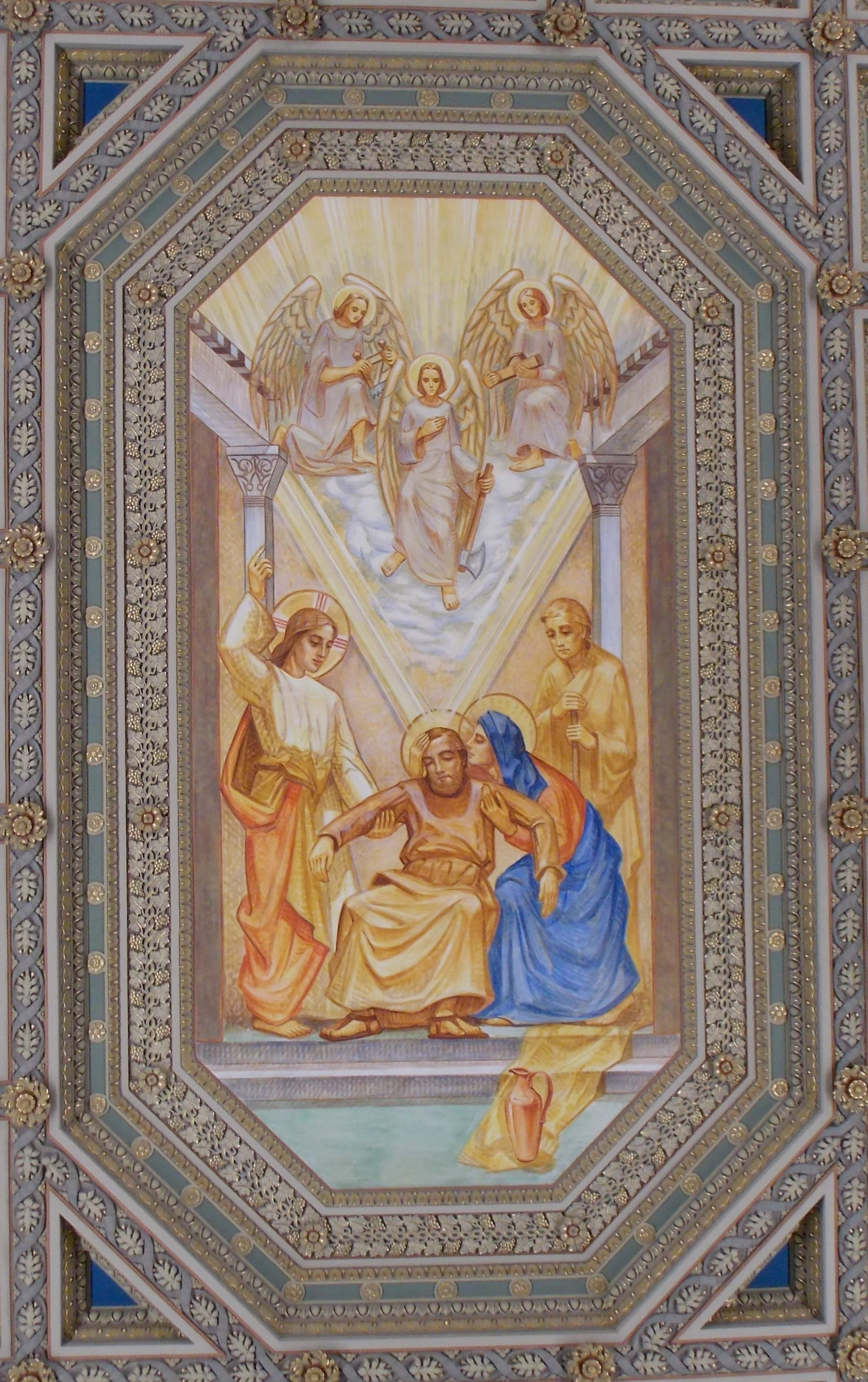
Ceiling detail

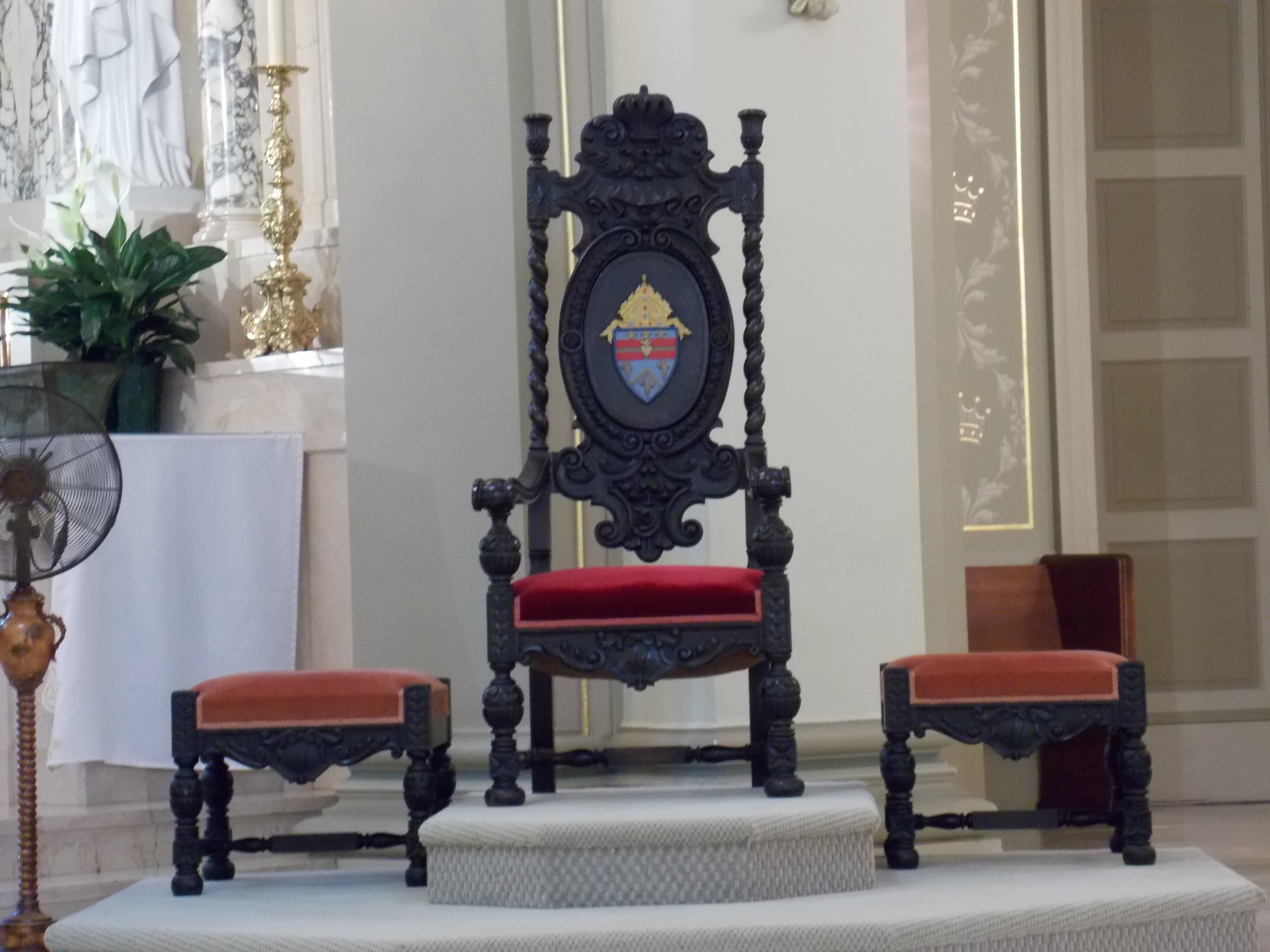
Cathedra

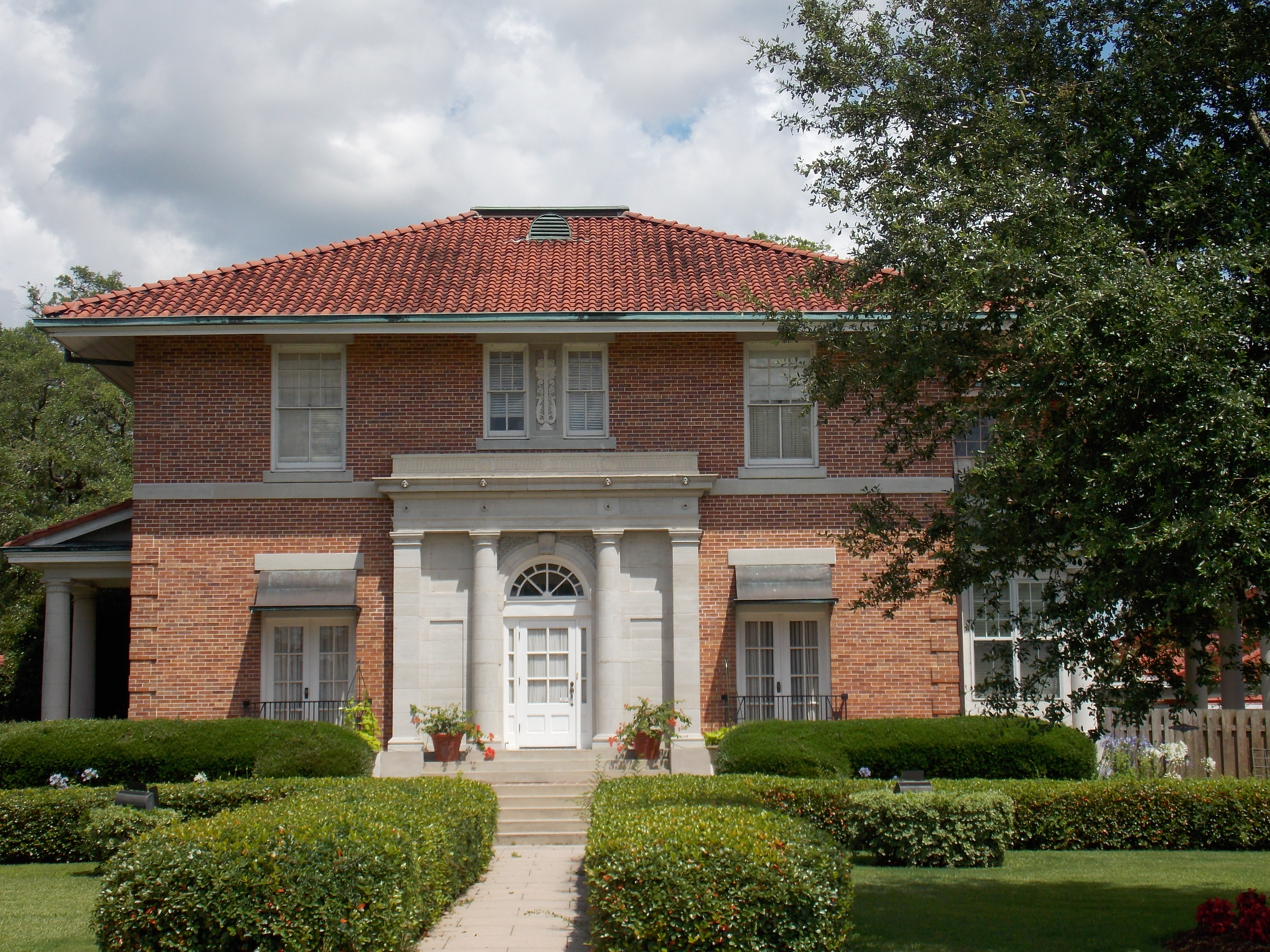
Rectory

== See also ==
- List of Catholic cathedrals in the United States
- List of cathedrals in the United States
- Thibodaux Multiple Resource Area:
  - Bank of Lafourche Building
  - Breaux House
  - Building at 108 Green Street
  - Chanticleer Gift Shop
  - Citizens Bank of Lafourche
  - Grand Theatre
  - Lamartina Building
  - McCulla House
  - Peltier House
  - Percy-Lobdell Building
  - Riviere Building
  - Riviere House
  - Robichaux House
