= Robichaux House =

Historic house in Louisiana, United States

- U.S. National Register of Historic Places
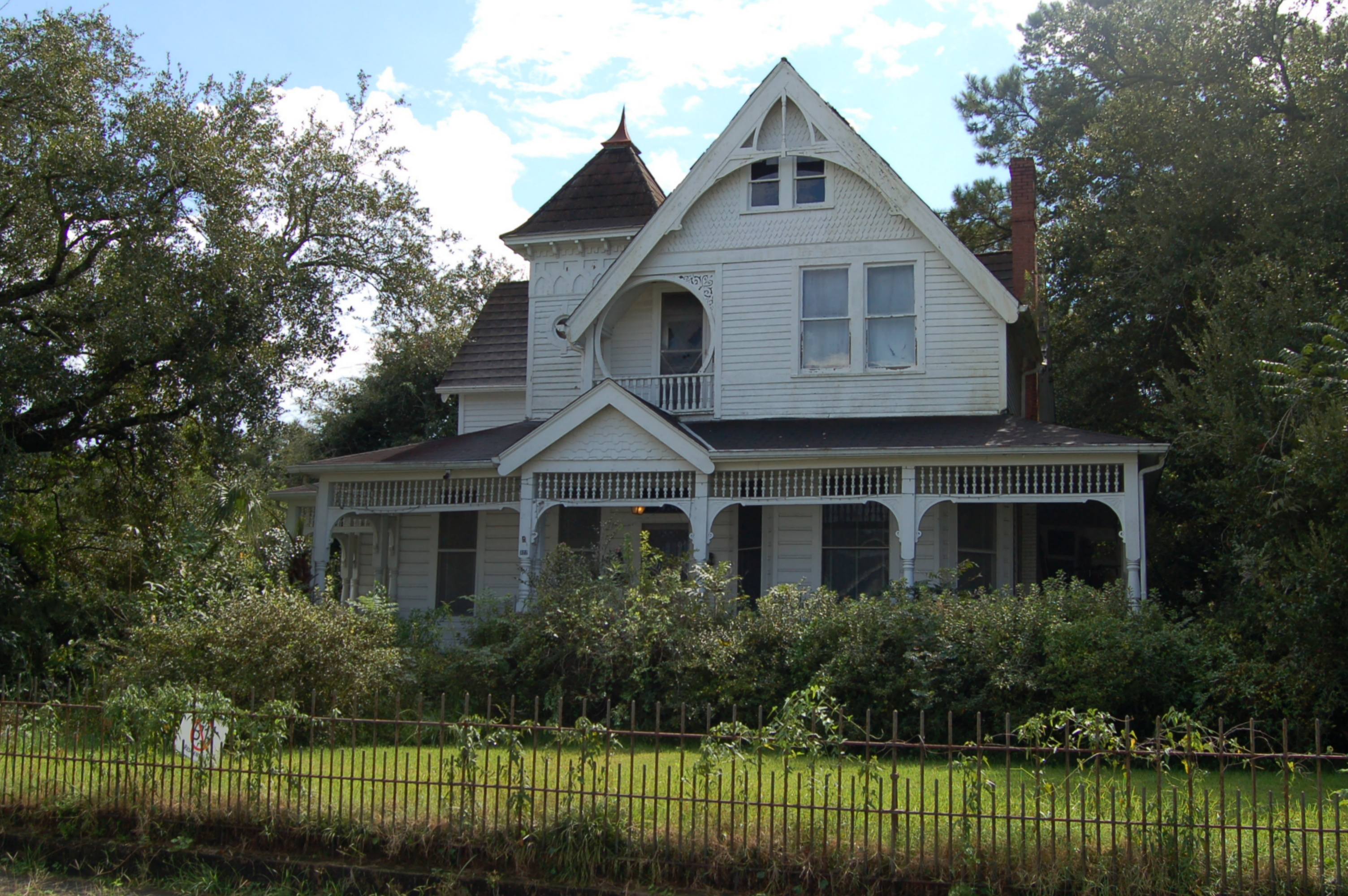

- Location within Louisiana Location within the United States
- Location: 322 East 2nd Street, Thibodaux, Louisiana
- Coordinates: 29°47′51″N 90°48′58″W
- Area: 1.1 acres (0.45 ha)
- Built: 1898
- Built by: E.G. Robichaux
- Architectural style: Queen Anne Revival, Eastlake
- MPS: Thibodaux MRA
- NRHP reference No.: 86000434
- Added to NRHP: March 5, 1986

The Robichaux House is a historic house located at 322 East 2nd Street in Thibodaux, Louisiana.

Built in 1898, the house is a two-story frame residence in Queen Anne Revival style with Eastlake gallery details, three polygonal bays and two chimneys. The roof features a square turret with two oculi.

The style of the building reflects the "second wave of prosperity" in Thibodaux, where houses were first designed in the Greek Revival style.

The house was listed on the National Register of Historic Places on March 5, 1986.

It is one of 14 individually NRHP-listed properties in the "Thibodaux Multiple Resource Area", which also includes:

- Bank of Lafourche Building
- Breaux House
- Building at 108 Green Street
- Chanticleer Gift Shop
- Citizens Bank of Lafourche
- Grand Theatre
- Lamartina Building
- McCulla House
- Peltier House
- Percy-Lobdell Building
- Riviere Building
- Riviere House
- St. Joseph Co-Cathedral and Rectory
