= Overton (name) =

Notable people with the name Overton include:

== Surname ==
- Al Overton, Jr., American sound engineer
- Anthony Overton (1865–1946), American banker and manufacturer
- Ben Overton (1926–2012), Chief Justice for the Florida Supreme Court
- Bo Overton (born 1960), American basketball coach
- Carrie Burton Overton (1888–1975), American stenographer, clubwoman, and pianist
- Cathy Overton-Clapham (born 1969), Canadian curler
- Charles Overton (1805–1889), English cleric and writer
- Claude Overton (1927–1996), American professional basketball player
- Connor Overton (born 1993), American baseball player
- Constantine Overton, English Quaker leader
- Craig Overton (born 1994), English cricketer
- David M. Overton (born 1946), American restaurateur
- David Overton (rowing) (born 1943), Canadian rower
- Dillon Overton (born 1991), American baseball player
- Diondre Overton (1998–2024), American football player
- Dolphin D. Overton (1926–2013), American aviator
- Don Overton (born 1967), American football player
- Doug Overton (born 1969), American basketball player
- Edward Overton, Jr. (1836–1903), United States representative from Pennsylvania
- Elli Overton (born 1974), Canadian/Australian swimmer
- Ernest Overton (1865–1933), British physiologist and biologist
- Esther Overton (born 1990), Australian swimmer
- Frank Overton (1918–1967), American actor
- Fred Overton (1938–2019), American basketball coach
- Gwendolen Overton (1874/76–1958), American author
- Guy Overton (1919–1993), New Zealand cricketer
- Hall Overton (1920–1972), American composer
- Heidi Overton (born 1989), American physician and politician
- Iain Overton (born 1973), British writer and journalist
- Jamie Overton (born 1994), English cricketer
- Jeff Overton (born 1983), American golfer
- Jeffrey Overton Jr. (born 2007), American football player
- John Overton (disambiguation), multiple people
- Joseph P. Overton (1960–2003), American political activist, creator of the Overton window concept
- Kelly Overton (born 1978), American actress
- Kelly Overton (activist), American activist
- LT Overton (born 2004), American football player
- Macon C. Overton (1890–1918), U.S. Marine officer, namesake of USS Overton
- Matt Overton (born 1985), American football player
- Nancy Overton (1926–2009), American singer
- Norris W. Overton (1926–2023), Brigadier General in the United States Air Force
- Peter Overton (born 1966), Australian television journalist
- Richard Overton (disambiguation), multiple people
- Rick Overton (born 1954), American screenwriter, actor and comedian
- Robert Overton (c.1609–1678), English Major General in the New Model Army
- Spencer Overton (born 1968), American lawyer and law scholar
- Thomas Overton (1753–1824), American military and political leader
- Tom Overton (1930–1988), American sound engineer
- Virginia Overton (born 1971), American artist
- Volma Overton (1924–2005), American civil rights activist
- Walter Hampden Overton (1788–1845), U.S. Congressman
- Watkins Overton (1894–1958), American politician
- Wendy Overton (born 1947), American tennis player
- Wil Overton, British artist
- Willis Overton, American psychologist
- William Overton (disambiguation), multiple people

== Given name ==
- Overton Vertis Wright (1939–1980), American singer O. V. Wright
