= John Overton =

John Overton may refer to:

== People ==
- John Overton (printseller) (1640–1713), seller of prints and maps who succeeded Peter Stent
- John Overton (priest) (1763–1838), English clergyman
- John Overton (judge) (1766–1833), judge at the Superior Court of Tennessee
- John Henry Overton (1835–1903), English cleric and church historian
- John H. Overton (1875–1948), United States Senator
- John Overton (footballer) (born 1956), English football (soccer) player
- John W. Overton (1894–1918), athlete and United States Marine KIA in World War I
- John Overton (runner), winner of the 1000 yards at the 1917 USA Indoor Track and Field Championships

== Other uses ==
- John Overton High School, Nashville, Tennessee
