= 1948 United States Senate election in Louisiana =

1948 Democratic Senate primary election in Louisiana
- August 31, 1948
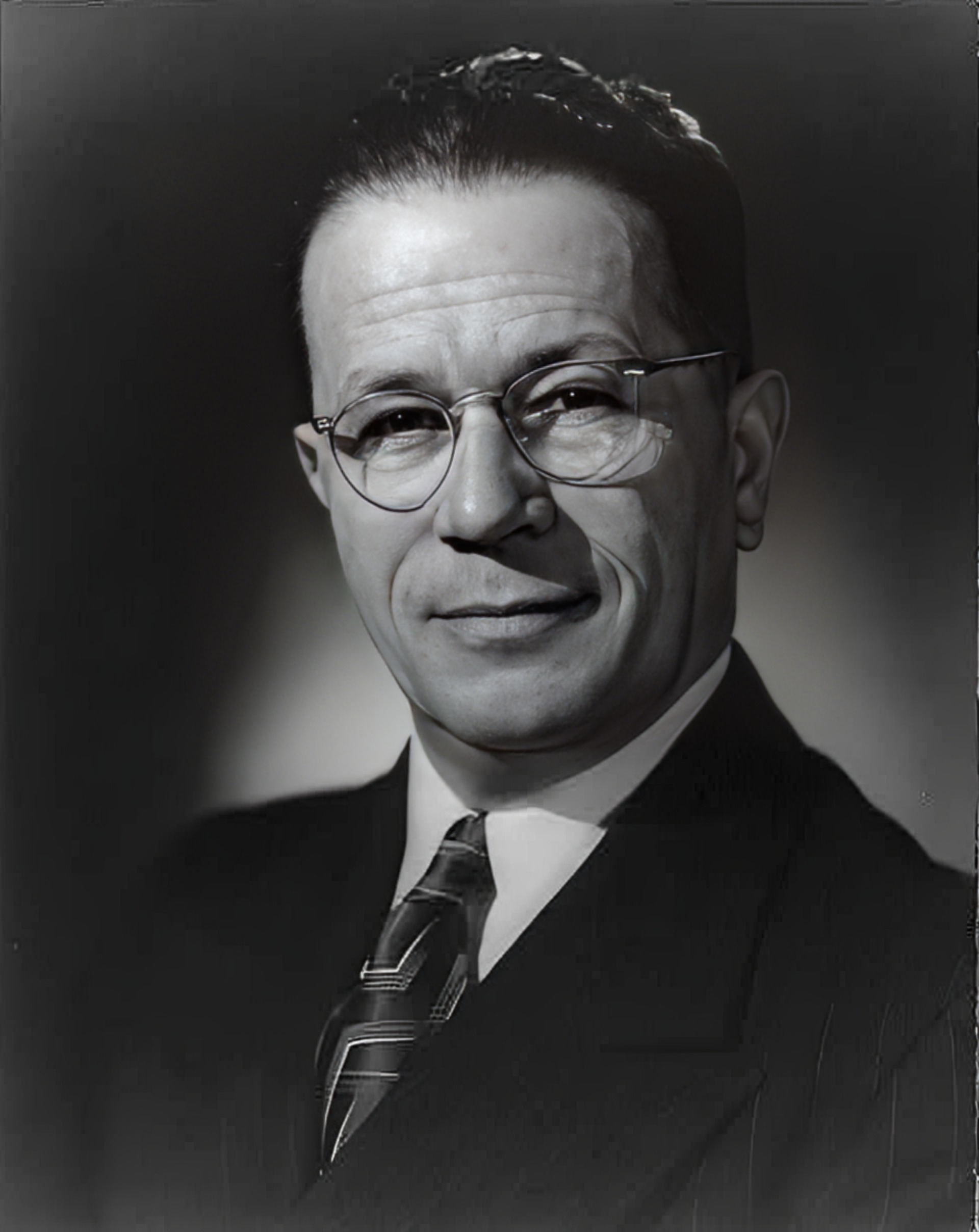

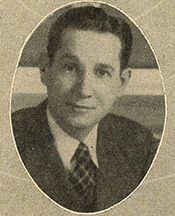

| Nominee | Allen Ellender | James Domengeaux | Charles S. Gerth |
| Party | Democratic | Democratic | Democratic |
| Popular vote | 284,293 | 119,459 | 57,047 |
| Percentage | 61.70% | 25.92% | 12.38% |
- Parish results Ellender: 40–50% 50–60% 60–70% 70–80% >90%
U.S. senator before election
Allen Ellender
Democratic
Elected U.S. Senator
Allen Ellender
Democratic

The 1948 United States Senate election in Louisiana was held on November 2, 1948. Incumbent Senator Allen J. Ellender was re-elected to a third term in office.

On August 31, Ellender won the Democratic primary with 61.7% of the vote. At this time, Louisiana was a one-party state, and the Democratic nomination was tantamount to victory. Ellender won the November general election without an opponent.

== Democratic primary ==
=== Candidates ===
- James Domengeaux, U.S. Representative from Louisiana's 3rd congressional district
- Allen J. Ellender, incumbent Senator
- Charles S. Gerth, candidate for Senate in 1944

=== Results ===
1948 United States Senate Democratic primary
| Party | Candidate | Votes | % |
|---|---|---|---|
| Democratic | Allen J. Ellender (incumbent) | 284,293 | 61.70% |
| Democratic | James R. Domengeaux | 119,459 | 25.92% |
| Democratic | Charles S. Gerth | 57,047 | 12.38% |
| Total votes | | 460,799 | 100.00% |

== General election ==
1948 United States Senate election
| Party | Candidate | Votes | % | ±% |
|---|---|---|---|---|
| Democratic | Allen J. Ellender (incumbent) | 330,115 | 100.00% | Steady |
| Total votes | | 330,115 | 100.00% | |
