= Robert Whyte (judge) =

American judge (1787–1844)

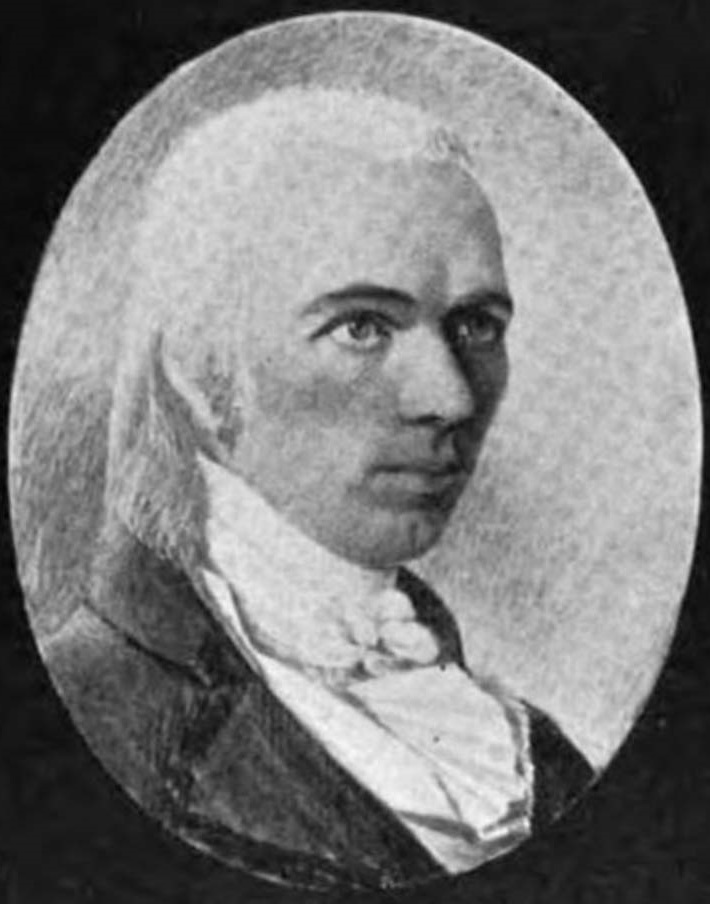
Tennessee Supreme Court Justice Robert Whyte

Robert Whyte (January 6, 1787 – November 12, 1844) was a justice of the Tennessee Supreme Court from 1816 to 1834.

Born in Wigtownshire, Scotland, Whyte's parents intended for him to enter the ministry, and with that end in view he was highly educated at Edinburgh. He asked his parents permission to pursue a different professions, and when they refused, Whyte he emigrated to America. He reportedly taught for several years as a professor of languages in William and Mary College, although the accuracy of this account is disputed. He studied law, he went to North Carolina to practice, and having been licensed to practice law in Tennessee in September 1802, moved to Nashville, Tennessee, in 1804.

In May 1816, Whyte was appointed to the Tennessee Supreme Court to succeed John Overton. In October of the following year, Whyte "narrowly won election by the General Assembly to fill the seat", and then served until 1834, his eighteen year term of service being longest on the court to that point, and one rarely surpassed thereafter. During his tenure, Whyte was "one of the Court's foremost advocates of English law as providing guidance". His service on the court was describe by The Green Bag as follows:

As Supreme Judge he sustained himself well during his long term of service with many able men, and his opinions commanded great respect, though he was a literalist and laid great stress on technicalities. He was highly esteemed for his strict sense of honor and great integrity. ... The entry on the minutes of the Supreme Court on the announcement of his death bears testimony as to the high regard of his successors for "his integrity, his firmness, his legal erudition, his eminent ability, and his conscientious discharge of his duties".

On the reorganization of the court after the adoption of the Constitution of 1834, advancing years and the possession of what was then a large fortune disinclined him to further judicial work; and he retired.

Political offices
Preceded by John Overton	Justice of the Tennessee Supreme Court; 1816–1834	Succeeded by Court reorganized
