= Thomas Overton =

American army officer (1753–1824)

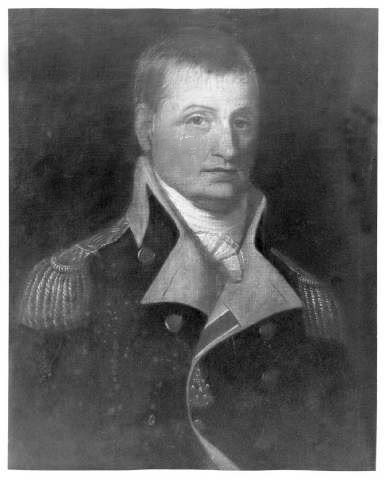
- General Overton, c. 1812
- Born: August 15, 1753; Louisa County, Virginia, U.S.
- Died: February 27, 1824 (aged 70); Tennessee, U.S.
- Spouse(s): Sarah Woodson (m. 1787; died 1793) Penelope Holmes (m. 1795)
- Children: 5 (incl. Walter)
- Relatives: John Overton (brother); Gabriel Holmes (brother-in-law); Thomas Overton Moore (grandson)

Thomas Overton (August 15, 1753 – February 27, 1824) was an American military and political leader, best known for having been the second to Andrew Jackson in his duel with Charles Dickinson in 1806.

== Biography ==
Thomas Overton was born in Louisa County, Virginia, on August 15, 1753. His parents were James Overton and Mary Waller. His younger brother, John (of Travellers Rest) would go on to become one of Andrew Jackson's closest friends and was the founder of the city of Memphis. Overton served throughout the Revolutionary War in the Continental Army, and was an original member of the Society of the Cincinnati in Virginia.

He was first appointed 2nd Lieutenant in the 9th Virginia Regiment in 1776 and was promoted to 1st Lieutenant in 1778. He was transferred to the 1st Virginia Regiment on March 14, 1778, and was made a Lieutenant, adjutant of the 4th Continental Dragoons on July 1, 1779. He was made a Captain on April 24, 1781.

He spent a number of years in mid-life in North Carolina (where he represented Moore County as a Senator in the State Legislature, which made him a Brigadier General), and around 1804 he moved to Tennessee, where he died on February 27, 1824.

== Personal life ==
Overton married Sarah Woodson in 1787, and they were married until her death. Overton then married Penelope Holmes (a sister of Gabriel Holmes) in 1795. He had five children (three with Woodson and two with Holmes): his daughter Jane (by his first wife) was the mother of Thomas Overton Moore, Governor of Louisiana from 1860 to 1864, and his son (by his first wife) Walter Hampden Overton was elected to the United States House of Representatives in 1828.

His son William S. Overton died of typhus at age 15 in 1822 while enrolled at the United States Military Academy. Another son, James G. Overton, may have been involved with the 1826 Christmas cadet riot at the academy, and died by 1828.

== Duel ==
On May 20, 1806, tensions escalated between Andrew Jackson and Charles Dickinson. On May twenty, Mr. Dickinson was in Nashville. On the twenty-first he handed a ‘card’ to Editor Eastin of the Review... On the twenty-second General Thomas Overton, a militia brigadier and a brother of Jackson's intimate, John Overton, took the word to Clover Bottom. Jackson made him read the article and bring back the gist of it” [i]After reading the article himself, Jackson learned that it called him “a worthless scoundrel, a poltroon and a coward,” prompting him to issue a challenge. Dickinson replied promptly:

“May 23d. 1806

Gen Andrew Jackson,

Sir, Your note of this morning is received, and your request shall be granted. My friend who hands you this will make the necessary arrangements. I am etc.

CHARLES DICKINSON.” (Andrew Jackson: The Border Captain, pp. 120–121).[ii]

Since Dickinson was considered an expert shot, Jackson and his friend, Thomas Overton, determined it would be best to let Dickinson fire first, hoping that his aim might be spoiled in his quickness. The obvious weakness of this tactic was, of course, that Jackson might not be alive to take aim. [iii]

Jackson and Overton also devised a strategy that, if Overton should win the coin toss to give the word to fire, he would ask Dickinson the question "Gentleman, are you ready?" purposefully after asking Jackson, and then would immediately say "Fire" in an attempt to cause Dickinson to fire impulsively. Overton did indeed win the coin toss, and subsequently used this strategy.

Before the duel, Overton advised Jackson to take precautions. “Thomas Overton, a lifelong friend and second in the duel, advised Jackson to unbutton his coat, as Dickinson had said his target would be the button over Jackson's heart. Jackson did loosen his coat before the fight” (Donelson, Tennessee: Its History and Landmarks, p. 94).[iv][v]

As they approached the dueling grounds, Jackson and Overton discussed their strategy. “It had been agreed that the two men should stand facing the same direction, and that at the word they should turn toward each other and fire as they chose... they agreed that Dickinson should be allowed to fire first. Like most crack shots, he was a quick one... Jackson was sure to hit in a deliberate shot, but if he fired quickly and an instant after he was hit by a ball, his aim would probably be destroyed” [vi]

Their plan unfolded exactly as expected. “At the word ‘Fire!’ by Overton, Dickinson shot and his bullet hit Jackson in the breast, cracking a rib. Jackson did not flinch and did not let on that he had been shot. Dickinson was surprised that he missed. Jackson fired but his pistol stopped at half-cock. He was entitled to another shot. He steadied himself and fired. Dickinson fell. He died after a day of agony” (Donelson, Tennessee: Its History and Landmarks, p. 94). Even though wounded, “Jackson managed as to leave the field without letting anyone know that he was wounded. People were not so concerned with his wound; they were horrified over the affair” [vii]

[i] (Andrew Jackson: The Border Captain, pp. 120–121).

[ii] CHARLES DICKINSON.” (Andrew Jackson: The Border Captain, pp. 120–121).

[iii] (The Duel Between Dickinson and Jackson". History of Caroline County, Maryland, from its beginning; material largely contributed by the teachers and children of the county, rev. and supplemented by Laura C. Cochrane, Lavinia R. Crouse, Mrs Wilsie S. Gibson, A. May Thompson, Edward M. Noble of the Caroline County schools. Federalsburg, Maryland: J. W. Stowell Printing Co. 1920. pp. 126–128 – via HathiTrust)

[iv] ” (Donelson, Tennessee: Its History and Landmarks, p. 94).

[v] (Donelson, Tennessee: Its History and Landmarks, p. 94).

[vi] (The Life of Andrew Jackson, pp. 62–63).

[vii] (Donelson, Tennessee: Its History and Landmarks, p. 94).

== Read more ==
- Lineage Book - National Society of the Daughters of the American Revolution Volumes 59-60
