= Edwin E. Willis =

American politician (1904–1972)

Edwin Edward Willis
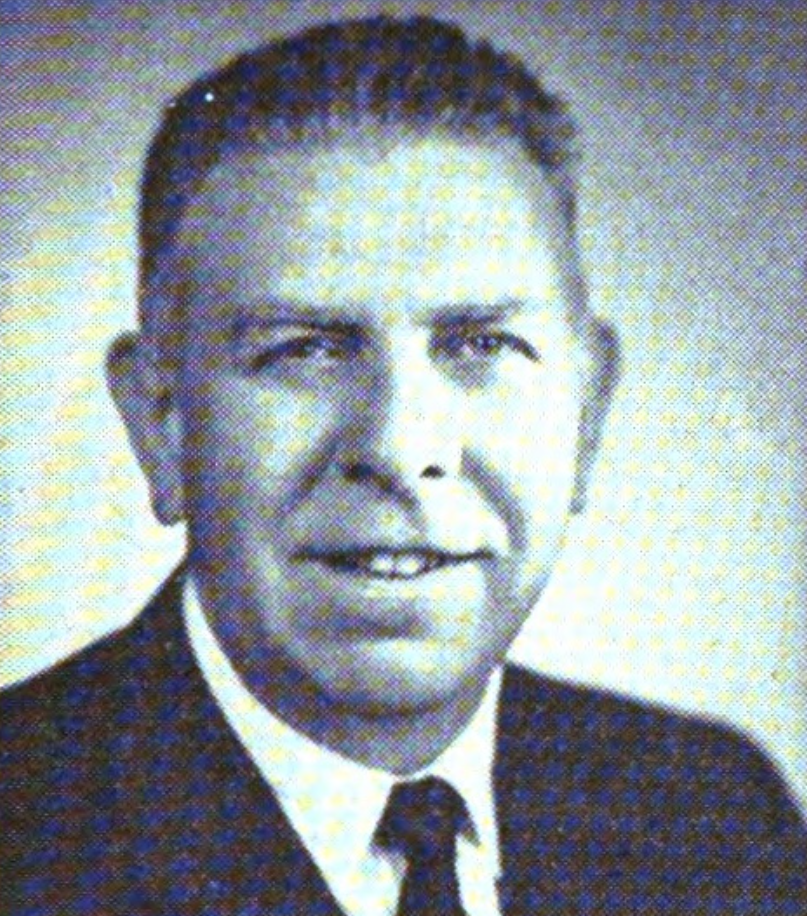

Member of the U.S. House of Representatives from Louisiana's 3rd district
- In office January 3, 1949 – January 3, 1969
- Preceded by: James R. Domengeaux
- Succeeded by: Patrick T. Caffery

Member of the Louisiana State Senate from Lafayette Parish
- In office 1948–1948
- Preceded by: Two-member district: Edward P. Burguieres Cornelius P. Voorhies
- Succeeded by: Bernard Trappey

Personal details
- Born: October 2, 1904 Arnaudville, Louisiana, U.S.
- Died: October 24, 1972 (aged 68) St. Martinville, Louisiana, U.S.
- Resting place: St. Michael's Cemetery in St. Martinville, Louisiana
- Party: Democratic
- Spouse: Estelle Bulliard Willis
- Children: 1
- Education: St. Martinville High School; Loyola University New Orleans College of Law
- Occupation: Attorney; Planter

Edwin Edward Willis (October 2, 1904 – October 24, 1972) was an American politician and attorney from the U.S. state of Louisiana who was affiliated with the Long political faction. A Democrat, he served in the Louisiana State Senate during 1948 and in the United States House of Representatives from 1949 to 1969.

Described by one study as a “relatively liberal southerner,” Willis voted in favor of various progressive measures during the course of his congressional career such as those related to the federal minimum wage, housing, education, healthcare, and poverty reduction. At the same time, however, Willis voted against the Civil Rights Act of 1964.

== Biography ==
Willis was born in 1904 in Arnaudville, Louisiana of Joseph Olinder Willis and Julia Marie Hardy, the youngest of 11 children. Willis was of Cajun French descent by varying members of his mother and father's family.

Willis received his law degree from Loyola University in 1926 and was admitted to the bar that same year.

From 1926 to 1936, Willis was a law lecturer.

Willis's papers from 1949 to 1969 are conserved at the University of Louisiana at Lafayette.

== House of Representatives ==
=== House Un-American Activities Committee ===
Willis served on the U.S. House of Representatives' Un-American Activities Committee (HUAC) from 1957 to 1968, becoming chair of the committee in 1963 following the death of Francis E. Walter.

=== KKK Inquiries ===
In 1965 and 1966, Willis lead an inquiries into the Ku Klux Klan as chair of HUAC. These investigations led to seven Klan leaders, including Robert Shelton being cited for Contempt of Congress. Shelton was found guilty and sentenced to one year in prison, plus a $1,000 fine. Three other Klan leaders, Robert Scoggin, Bob Jones, and Calvin Craig, pleaded guilty. Scoggin and Jones were each sentenced to one year in prison, while Craig was fined $1,000. The charges against the others were later dropped.

=== JFK Assassination ===
On February 27, 1964, at Willis's direction, the director of the House Committee on Un-American Activities sent a letter to then US representative Gerald Ford with a report alleging two appointees of the congressional investigation into the assassination of John F Kennedy, attorney Norman Redlich and advocate Mark Lane, were affiliated with Communist organizations.

=== Lee Harvey Oswald ===
In 1965, the attorney for Robert Shelton of the United Klans of American, Shelton's attorney, met with Congressman Edwin E. Willis, Chair of the House Committee on Un-American Activities (HUAC), who was leading a congressional investigation into KKK activities at the time. At this meeting, the attorney told Willis that two weeks before the 1963 assassination of John F. Kennedy Shelton had been offered the services of Lee Harvey Oswald and that Oswald had already been involved in some bombings in Alabama.

After an FBI investigation into these claims, Assistant Director of the FBI Deke DeLoach, contacted Willis to inform him that the FBI had determined that the information Shelton had provided to him about Oswald was not factual citing testimony from an FBI informant mentioned by Shelton as having been present for this meeting that the meeting had never happened.

=== Leaving office ===
In 1966, Willis suffered a series of stokes which contributed to his defeat by his successor Patrick Caffery in the 1968 Democratic primary. Willis left office in 1969.

== Death ==
Willis died in St. Martinville, Louisiana, on October 24, 1972 and was interred in St. Martin of Tours Catholic Cemetery.

U.S. House of Representatives
Preceded by James Domengeaux	Member of the U.S. House of Representatives from Louisiana's 3rd congressional district 1949–1969	Succeeded by Patrick T. Caffery
Louisiana State Senate
Preceded by Two-member district: Edward P. Burguieres; Cornelius P. Voorhies	Louisiana State Senator from Lafayette Parish; 1948–1948	Succeeded by Bernard Trappey
