= William L. Brent =

American politician (1784–1848)

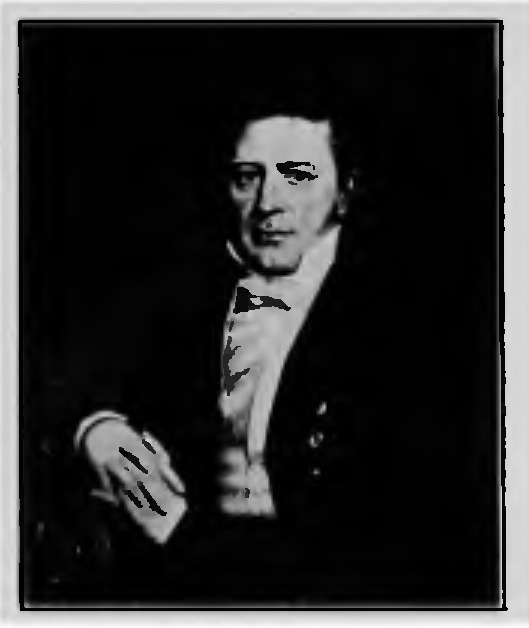
- Born: February 20, 1784
- Died: July 7, 1848 (aged 64)

William Leigh Brent— (February 20, 1784 – July 7, 1848) was a lawyer, plantation owner, and slaveholder in Maryland and Louisiana, and three-term U.S. representative representing Louisiana's 3rd congressional district.

== Early and family life ==
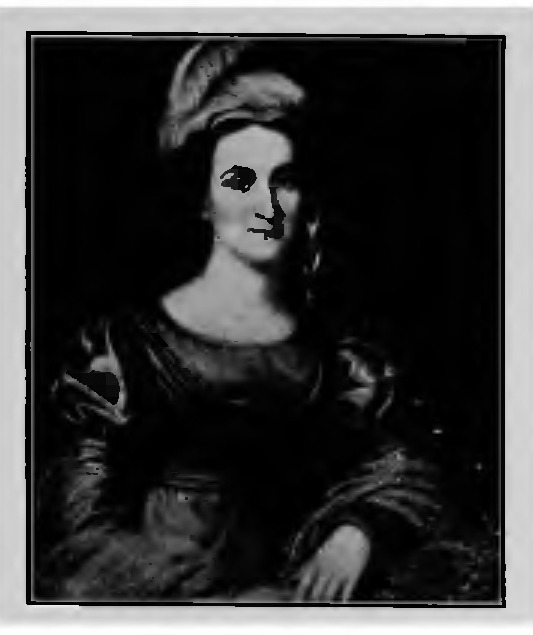
Maria Fenwick Brent

Brent was born at Port Tobacco, Charles County, Maryland, on February 20, 1784, the first child of Robert Brent (1759–1810) and Dorothy Leigh Brent. His father's family (including lawyer/nun Margaret Brent) had owned land in that area of Maryland since about 1640, but some had fled to Virginia before the American Revolutionary War. His maternal grandfather, William Leigh, owned St. Bernards, a plantation near the Port Tobacco River at Pomonkey, which he gave to Robert and Dorothy when they married.

Robert Brent built a house which he named Brentfield (the manor house which later burnt to the ground was about a mile from Bel Alton, Maryland). However, because William Leigh Brent married a local heiress, his father secured William's consent to leaving it to his younger brother, George Brent (1817–1881), who became a Judge of Maryland's Seventh Judicial District and of the Circuit Court of Appeals. Virginia congressman and Senator Richard Brent (1757–1814) was a paternal cousin. Another paternal cousin was Robert Brent (1764–1819), who became the first mayor of Washington, D.C., and freed his slaves in his will.

William Leigh Brent studied law and was admitted to the bar of Maryland. In 1809 he married his first cousin Maria Fenwick (daughter of Col. James Fenwick and Teresa Brent), with whom he would have nine children (as discussed in the Legacy section below).

== Career ==
William Leigh Brent and his new wife soon moved to Louisiana, where Brent began his legal career. President James Madison named him Deputy Attorney General for the western district of the Territory of Orleans. After the international slave trade became illegal, many Maryland and Virginia-born enslaved people were shipped through Port Tobacco to the sugar plantations of Louisiana; prosecuting fugitive slave cases was part of his job.

In 1822 Brent was elected as an Adams-Clay Republican to the Eighteenth Congress and moved to Washington, D.C. The following year, his father-in-law died and he and Maria inherited an estate called Pomonkey on the creek of the same name near a village called Fenwick. W.L. Brent remained in Washington and Maryland until 1844, when he returned to Louisiana. He was Louisiana's representative in Congress from March 4, 1823, until March 3, 1829, having been elected as an Adams Republican to the Nineteenth, and Twentieth Congresses.

Representative Brent was a founding member of Louisiana's Whig Party, but was not again a candidate for public office. His successor was Jacksonian Democrat General Walter Hampden Overton, whose family had moved from Virginia when he was young, who became a war hero at the Battle of New Orleans and whose daughter married one of W.L. Brent's sons.

As his political career ended, Brent resumed the practice of law in Louisiana and in Washington, D.C.

== Death and legacy ==
Brent died in St. Martinville, Louisiana, on July 7, 1848. He is buried in St. Martin's Catholic Cemetery. An inscription on his gravestone indicates his especial popularity with the Acadian population of Teche Bayou in St. Martin Parish.

Four of their sons became lawyers and politicians. Their eldest son Robert James Brent (1811–1872) remained in Maryland, having married Matilda Lawrence of Hagerstown, Maryland. He practiced law in Baltimore and Washington, D.C., and was the last Attorney General under the Maryland constitution replaced in 1851 (that Brent having helped to legislate himself out of what had been a lifetime office). Another son, James Fenwick Brent (1814–1847) became a prominent lawyer in Louisiana, and married the daughter of General Walter Hampden Overton. He predeceased his father (and within two years of serving as a delegate to Louisiana's constitutional convention of 1845). Another son, Joseph Lancaster Brent (1826–1905), became a lawyer after studying at Georgetown University, married a Louisiana heiress, served two terms in the California legislature, then returned to serve in the Confederate Army as Major (rising to the rank of Brigadier General). After the American Civil War, Joseph L. Brent returned to Louisiana to manage his wife's estates and served two terms in the Louisiana legislature. The youngest son, Charles Vivian Brent (1831–1906) was born at Pomonkey and married a daughter of Maryland Senator William D. Merrick (his uncle George marrying another of Merrick's daughters). Although their children died young, C.V. Brent edited the Southern Maryland Independent newspaper as well as practiced law with his elder brother Robert in Baltimore. C.V. Brent also served in Maryland's post-war Constitutional Convention, and then was a lawyer in the Interior Department until his death in Georgetown.

U.S. House of Representatives
Preceded by None	Member of the U.S. House of Representatives from Louisiana's 3rd congressional district 1823 – 1829	Succeeded by Walter Hampden Overton
