= Greenlevel =

Historic house in Tennessee, United States

- U.S. National Register of Historic Places
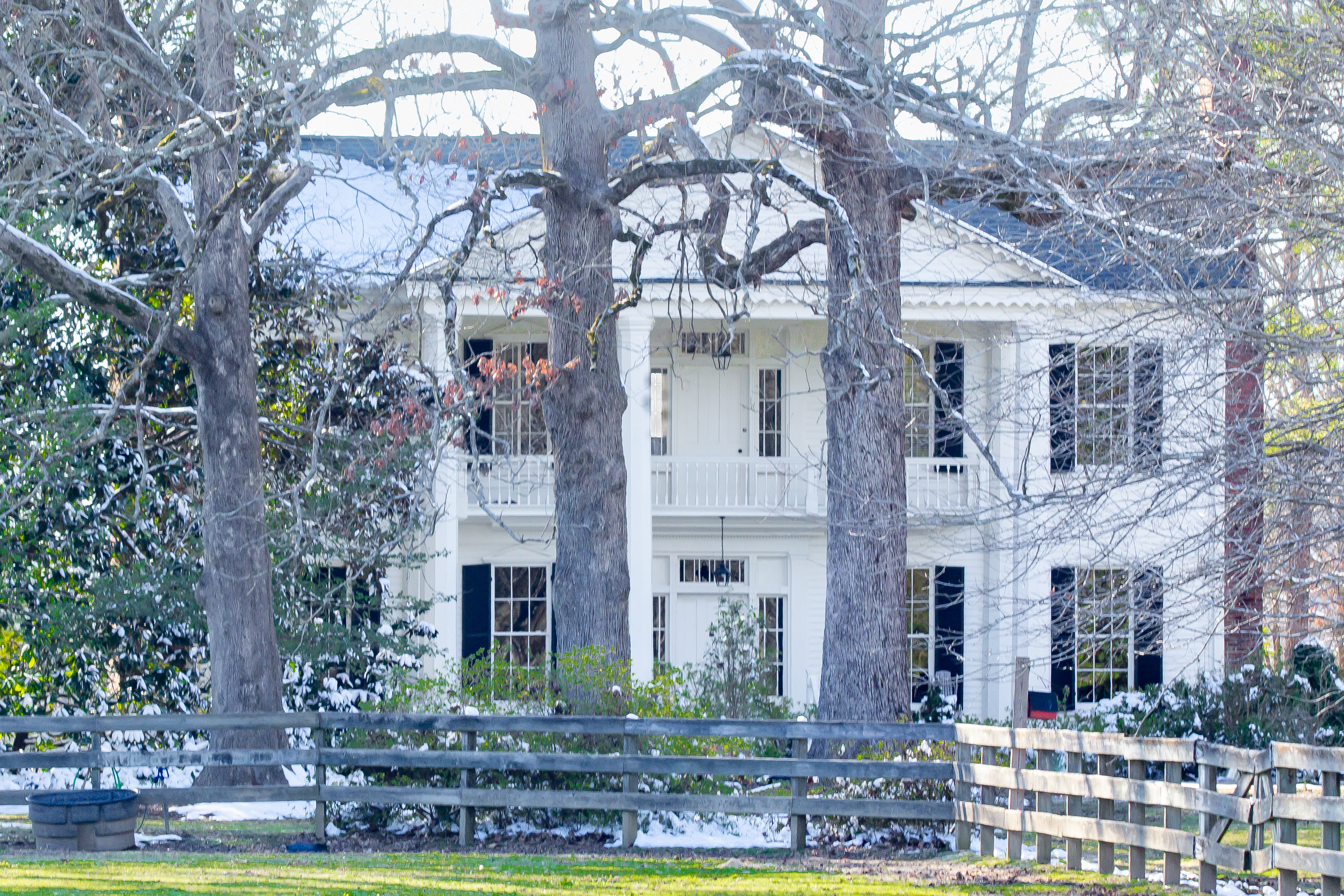

- Location within Tennessee
- Nearest city: Collierville, Tennessee
- Coordinates: 35°06′06″N 89°39′33″W
- Area: 11.4 acres (4.6 ha)
- Built: 1830
- Architect: Ace Edwards
- Architectural style: Greek Revival
- NRHP reference No.: 87000397
- Added to NRHP: March 6, 1987

Greenlevel is a historic mansion in Collierville, Tennessee. It was built in 1833 for Judge John Overton, and it was home to a state senator and the mayor of Collierville. It is listed on the National Register of Historic Places.

== History ==
The house was built in 1830 for Judge John Overton, a banker and politician who owned slaves. From 1833 to 1844, it belonged to his daughter Ann and her husband, Robert Campbell Brinkley, who helped build the Memphis and Charleston Railroad.

In 1850, The house was acquired by Dr. Virginius Leake, a physician and developer, in 1850. During the American Civil War of 1861–1865, Leake turned the house into a hospital for the Confederate States Army. After the war, he served in the Tennessee Senate. His son, E.K. Leake, served as the mayor of Collierville.

== Architectural significance ==
The house was redesigned by Ace Edwards in the Greek Revival architectural style in the 1850s. It has been listed on the National Register of Historic Places since March 6, 1987.
