= Robert L. Mouton =

American politician (1892–1956)

Robert Louis Mouton
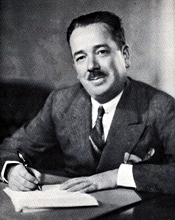

Member of the U.S. House of Representatives from Louisiana's 3rd district
- In office January 3, 1937 – January 3, 1941
- Preceded by: Numa F. Montet
- Succeeded by: James R. Domengeaux

Mayor of Lafayette, Louisiana
- In office 1919–1927
- In office 1931–1936

Personal details
- Born: October 20, 1892 Duchamp, St. Martin Parish; Louisiana
- Died: November 26, 1956 (aged 64) New Orleans, Louisiana
- Resting place: St. John's Cemetery in Lafayette, Louisiana
- Party: Democratic
- Education: University of Louisiana at Lafayette

Military service
- Branch/service: United States Marine Corps
- Battles/wars: World War I

Robert Louis Mouton (October 20, 1892 – November 26, 1956) was a U.S. representative from Louisiana.

Born in Duchamp in St. Martin Parish, Louisiana, Mouton moved with his parents to Lafayette, where he attended public schools. He graduated from the University of Louisiana at Lafayette, then known as Southwestern Louisiana Institute. He was employed as a clerk in a bank in 1911 and 1912. He served as member of the faculty of St. Charles College in Grand Coteau from 1912 to 1914. He engaged in the insurance business and also operated a night school at Lafayette in 1915 and 1916. He served as aide to the general receiver of customs on the island of Haiti, in 1916 and as collector of customs at Gonaives, Haiti, from March 1917 to April 1919. During World War I, Mouton enlisted in the United States Marine Corps, serving as an interpreter and intelligence officer attached to the first squadron of the first marine aviation outfit overseas from May 1918 to January 1919.

After the war, he returned to Lafayette and engaged in horticultural pursuits. He served as mayor of Lafayette from 1919–1927 and 1931–1936. Mouton was postmaster from May 1929 until his resignation in November 1930. He served as member of the United States Marine Corps Reserve, with rank of captain. He was a delegate to the 1936 Democratic National Convention.

Mouton was elected as a Democrat to the Seventy-fifth and Seventy-sixth Congresses (January 3, 1937 – January 3, 1941). He was an unsuccessful candidate for renomination in 1940, having lost the party primary to James Domengeaux. He then resumed his horticultural and real estate interests. He died in New Orleans on November 26, 1956. He was interred at St. John's Catholic Cemetery, Lafayette.

U.S. House of Representatives
Preceded by Numa Francois Montet	Member of the U.S. House of Representatives from Louisiana's 3rd congressional district 1937 – 1941	Succeeded by James Domengeaux
