= Richard Overton =

Richard Overton may refer to:

- Richard Overton (Leveller) (fl. 1640–1664), pamphlet writer and member of the Leveller movement during the English Civil War
- Richard Overton (sound engineer), American film sound technician
- Richard Arvin Overton (1906–2018), American soldier, who was the oldest living veteran of World War II and oldest man in the USA at the time of his death.
- Richard C. Overton (1907–1988), American railroad historian
- Rick Overton (born 1954), American screenwriter, actor and comedian
