= Whitmell P. Martin =

American politician (1867–1929)

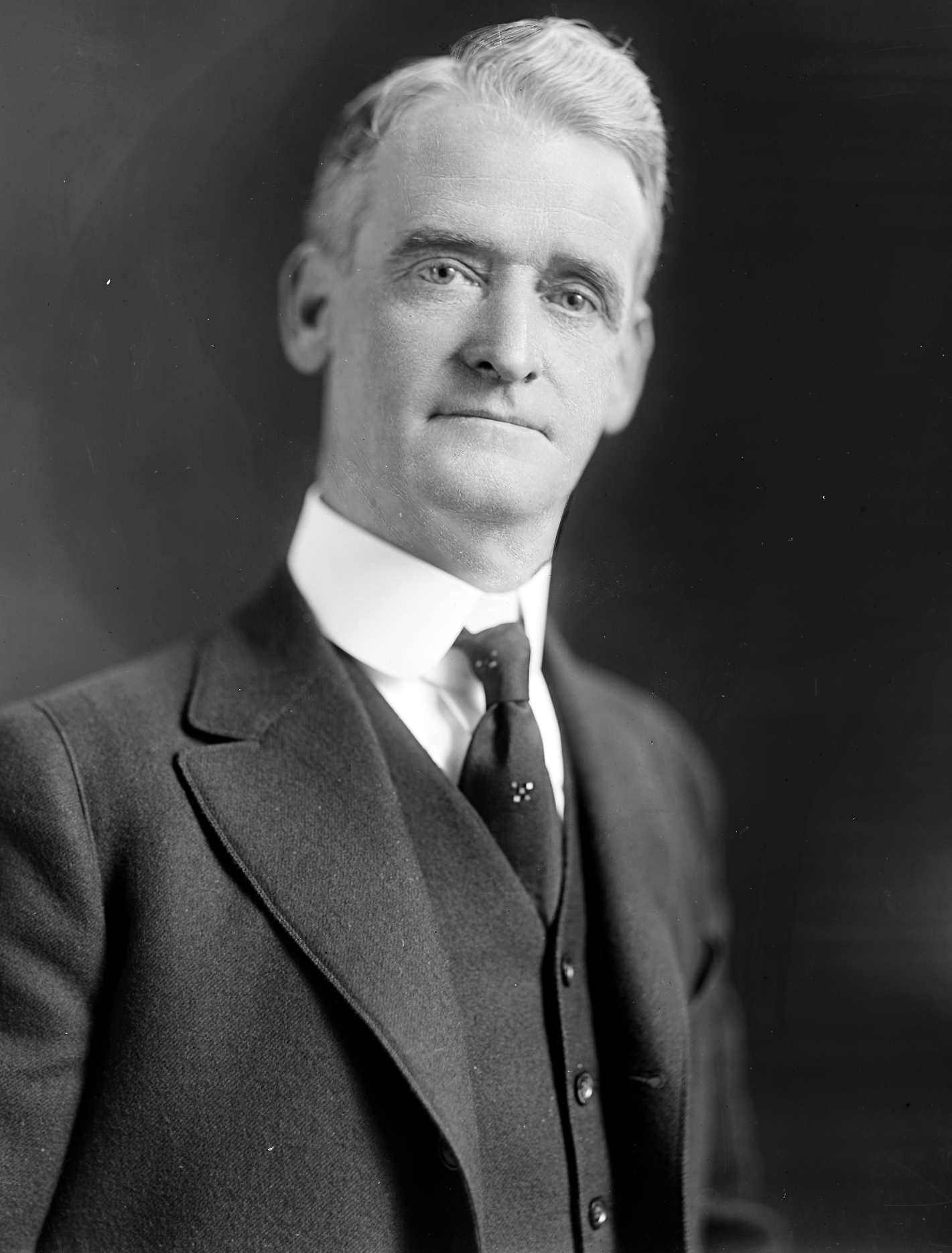
- Martin, 1905–29

Member of the U.S. House of Representatives from Louisiana's 3rd district
- In office March 4, 1915 – April 6, 1929
- Preceded by: Robert F. Broussard
- Succeeded by: Numa F. Montet

Personal details
- Born: Whitmell Pugh Martin; August 12, 1867 Napoleonville, Louisiana
- Died: April 6, 1929 (aged 61) Washington, D.C.
- Party: Progressive (1914-1918); Democratic
- Spouse: Amy Williamson (1896-1923, his death)

Whitmell Pugh Martin (August 12, 1867 – April 6, 1929) was an American lawyer who served as a U.S. representative from Louisiana from 1915 to 1929. Although he later served most of his congressional career as a Democrat, Martin was first elected as a "Bull Moose" Progressive in 1914. He is the only individual ever to represent Louisiana in Congress as a member of that party.

== Biography ==
Born near Napoleonville, Assumption Parish, Louisiana, to Robert Campbell Martin and Margerite Chism (Littlejohn) Martin, Whitmell attended the public schools and was privately tutored. He graduated from the Louisiana State University in 1888.

He was a professor of chemistry at Kentucky Military Institute in 1889 and 1890. He worked as a chemist for Imperial Sugar at Sugar Land, Texas, in 1890 and 1891.

=== Legal career ===
Martin studied law at the University of Virginia, Charlottesville, Virginia, in 1891 and 1892. He was admitted to the bar in 1892 and commenced practice in Napoleonville, Louisiana. He moved to Thibodaux, Louisiana, the same year and continued the practice of law.

=== Early career ===
From 1894 to 1900, he was superintendent of schools for Lafourche Parish, Louisiana. On April 14, 1896, he married Amy Williamson. He served as district attorney for the 20th judicial district of Louisiana from 1900 to 1906 and judge of the same district from 1906 to 1914.

=== Congress ===
Elected in 1914 as a "Bull Moose" Progressive to the Sixty-fourth and Sixty-fifth Congresses, Martin was the last non-Democrat to represent Louisiana in Congress prior to the election of Republican David C. Treen, also from Louisiana's 3rd congressional district, in 1972. Martin was the only individual to represent Louisiana in Congress during the 20th century without being a member of either the Democratic Party or the Republican Party. In 1916 he narrowly won re-election against Sheriff Wade O. Martin, Sr. by 99 votes, less than a percent separating the two lead candidates.

In 1918, he sought re-election as a Democrat to the Sixty-sixth Congress, and continued as a Democrat through the ensuing five congressional elections, all of them uncontested. Martin thus served in Congress from March 4, 1915, until his death.

=== Later career ===
He was a delegate, representing his congressional district, to the 1920 Democratic National Convention in San Francisco. Martin was an Episcopalian as well as a Freemason.

== Death and burial ==
Martin died in Washington, D.C., on April 6, 1929 and was interred in St. John's Episcopal Cemetery, Thibodaux, Louisiana.

== See also ==
- List of members of the United States Congress who died in office (1900–1949)

U.S. House of Representatives
Preceded by Robert F. Broussard	Member of the U.S. House of Representatives from Louisiana's 3rd congressional district 1915-1929	Succeeded by Numa F. Montet
