= Bernard Trappey =

American politician

Member of the Louisiana State Senate
- In office 1949–1952
- Preceded by: Edwin E. Willis

Personal details
- Born: July 15, 1895
- Died: November 5, 1994 (aged 99)
- Party: Democratic

Bernard Trappey (July 15, 1895 – November 5, 1994) was an American politician. He served as a Democratic member of the Louisiana State Senate.

== Life and career ==
Trappey was a member of the New Iberia Board of Trustees.

In 1949, Trappey was elected to the Louisiana State Senate, serving until 1952.

Trappey died in November 1994, at the age of 99.
