= Edward Pearson (theologian) =

English academic and theologian

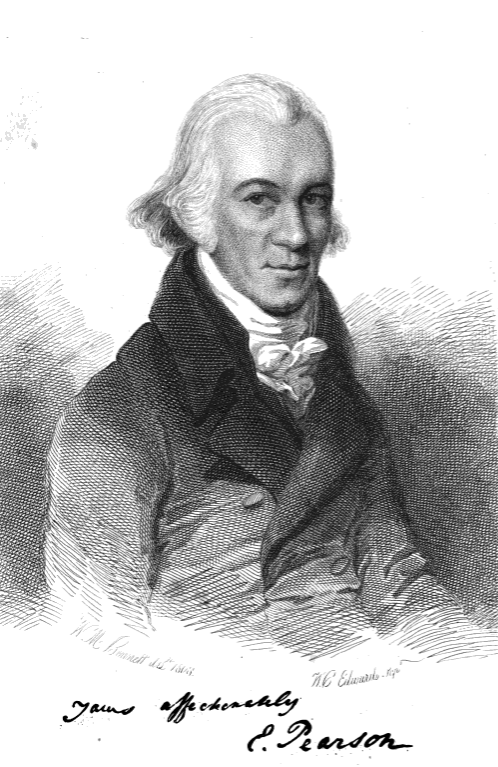
Edward Pearson

Edward Pearson (1756–1811) was an English academic and theologian, Master of Sidney Sussex College, Cambridge from 1808.

== Life ==
He was born at St. George's Tombland in Norwich on 25 October 1756, eldest son of Edward Pearson (d. 1786) a wool-stapler there, who shortly moved to Tattingstone, Suffolk and was governor of the local poorhouse. He was educated at home, and entered Sidney Sussex College, Cambridge as sizar, on 7 May 1778. The Rev. John Hey, the college tutor, who held the rectory of Passenham, Northamptonshire, appointed him his curate (26 April 1781).

Pearson was ordained by John Hinchliffe, the Bishop of Peterborough, on 26 June 1781; he graduated B.A. in 1782, M.A. 1785, and B.D. 1792, and was elected Fellow of his college. Early in 1788 he became tutor of Sidney Sussex College, and took on the curacy of Pampisford, about seven miles from Cambridge. He had previously held curacies not only at Passenham, but then also at Cosgrove, and at Strutton.

In 1796 Pearson left Cambridge to become vicar of Rempstone, Nottinghamshire, and became known as a controversialist. From a theological perspective, he was described as an "Arminian Champion". He also raised the question of open theism. He made evangelicalism a particular target.

In May 1806 Pearson proposed, in the Orthodox Churchman's Magazine, the foundation of "a ritual professorship in divinity" at Cambridge. Spencer Perceval, the Chancellor of the Exchequer, approved the scheme, and offered to guarantee the expenses for five years; but the university authorities did not adopt it. In 1807 Pearson was appointed through Perceval's influence Warburtonian lecturer at Lincoln's Inn.

In 1808 Pearson was elected Master of Sidney Sussex College, and received by royal mandate the degree of D.D.; the same year he was appointed vice-chancellor of the university. He died of an apoplectic fit at his parsonage at Rempstone on 17 August 1811. A Brief Memoir of Pearson was put together from his papers, and published in 1845, by William Powell Hunt.

== Works ==
In 1786 Pearson obtained the Norrisian prize for an essay on The Goodness of God as manifested in the Mission of Jesus Christ. His published works included:

- Thirteen Discourses to Academic Youth, delivered at St. Mary's, Cambridge (1798)
- Remarks on the Theory of Morals (1800), against William Paley.
- Annotations on the Practical Part of Dr. Paley's Work (1801)
- Remarks on the Controversy subsisting, or supposed to subsist, between the Arminian and Calvinistic Ministers of the Church of England (June 1802); this and other works were directed against John Overton.
- Remarks on the Dangers which threaten the Established Religion, and the Means of Averting Them (1808), advocacy for Spencer Perceval's policy in church matters.
- Hulsean Defence, consisting of an Essay on the Pre-existence of Christ, a Sermon on the Trinity, and a Proposal respecting the Athanasian Creed (1810), written as Christian Advocate.
- Cautions to the Hearers and Readers of the Rev. Mr. Simeon's Sermon entitled “Evangelical and Pharisaical Righteousness compared” (1810), part of his debate with Charles Simeon.

His publications included also tracts, sermons, and Prayers for Families, which went through four editions.

== Family ==
In 1797 Pearson married Susan, daughter of Richard Johnson of Henrietta Street, Covent Garden, London.
