= Louisiana's 3rd congressional district =

U.S. House district for Louisiana

Coordinates: 29°57′04″N 92°25′50″W

- Interactive map of district boundaries
- Representative: Clay Higgins; R–Lafayette
- Distribution: 73.4% urban; 26.6% rural
- Population (2025): 773,148
- Median household income: $65,308
- Ethnicity: 65.2% White; 22.6% Black; 5.6% Hispanic; 3.4% Two or more races; 1.8% Asian; 1.1% Native American; 0.4% other
- Cook PVI: R+22

Louisiana's 3rd congressional district is a United States congressional district in the U.S. state of Louisiana. The district covers the southwestern and south central portion of the state, ranging from the Texas border to the Atchafalaya River.

The district is currently represented by Republican Clay Higgins, a former sheriff's deputy from Port Barre known for his controversial Crime Stoppers videos. He was first elected to the United States House of Representatives in the December 10, 2016 runoff against public service commissioner Scott Angelle to replace Charles Boustany.

== History ==
Louisiana gained its 2nd and 3rd congressional districts in 1823 as part of the 18th United States Congress. Since at least the 1870s, the district has been strongly influenced by southern Louisiana's Acadian culture.

Although the 3rd congressional district had been Democratic through much of its history, it is the sole district in Louisiana to have been represented by three parties during the 20th century, in that Whitmell P. Martin represented the district as a "Bull Moose" Progressive from 1915 to 1919, when he switched to the Democratic Party. Since the turn of the 20th century, it had dominated Louisiana as a one-party state after the legislature passed a new constitution that effectively disenfranchised African Americans through the 1960s. Martin remained in office as a Democrat until his death in 1929.

The district became more competitive for the Republicans later in the 20th century, when conservative whites shifted into the Republican Party after passage of civil rights legislation by Congress. In 1966, Hall Lyons of Lafayette, polled 40 percent of the vote as a Republican candidate against veteran Democratic incumbent Edwin E. Willis. In 1972, the district elected David C. Treen as the first Republican U.S. representative from Louisiana since 1891. Treen previously lost three races to unseat entrenched 2nd District incumbent Hale Boggs, but easily won four times after his home in Metairie was shifted into the 3rd.

The state legislature redistricted in the 1980s, pushing the district out of the fast-growing suburbs of Metairie and the city of Kenner, to help keep the seat in the hands of Treen's Democratic successor, Billy Tauzin, who won a special election in May 1980 after Treen was elected Governor. Tauzin eventually switched to the Republican Party in 1995, making the 3rd congressional district unique in 20th-century Louisiana politics as the sole district to have two representatives who switched parties (Martin, who switched from the Progressives to the Democrats in 1918, and Tauzin, who switched from the Democrats to the Republicans in 1995). As a Republican, Tauzin continued to serve until retiring from Congress in 2005. Democrat Charlie Melançon won the seat in 2004 (seated in 2005), was reelected in 2006, and was unopposed in 2008.

For most of the time from 1823 to 2013, the district contained large portions of southeastern and south central Louisiana, including the River Parishes and East Acadiana, In its final configuration, it included many exurban and rural areas near New Orleans, Baton Rouge and Lafayette. It contained the cities of Chalmette, Gonzales, Houma, Thibodaux, Morgan City, and New Iberia.

However, when Louisiana lost a district after the 2010 census, the old 3rd was dismantled. The new 3rd included most of southwestern Louisiana, including Lafayette and Lake Charles. Most of this territory had been the 7th district before the 2010 census. The old 3rd's last congressman, freshman Republican Jeff Landry, had his home in New Iberia, along with much of the western portion of his district, drawn into the new 3rd. He opted to challenge the 7th district's four-term incumbent, fellow Republican Charles Boustany, in the GOP primary. However, Landry could not overcome the fact that he was running in a district in which more than 60 percent of his constituents were new to him. He lost to Boustany in the primary, ending his brief congressional career. The new 3rd, like both the old 3rd and 7th, has a rich Cajun culture.

== Parishes and communities ==
For the 119th and successive Congresses (based on the districts drawn following a 2023 court order), the district contains all or portions of the following parishes and communities.

Acadia Parish (13)

All 13 communities

Calcasieu Parish (8)

Carlyss (part; also 4th), Hayes, Iowa, Lake Charles (part; also 4th), Moss Bluff (part; also 4th), Prien (part; also 4th), Sulphur (part; also 4th), Westlake

Cameron Parish (2)

Cameron, Hackberry

Iberia Parish (5)

All five communities

Jefferson Davis Parish (7)

All seven communities

Lafayette Parish (7)

Broussard (shared with St. Martin Parish), Duson (shared with Acadia Parish), Lafayette (part; also 6th), Milton, Ossun, Scott (part; also 6th), Youngsville

Lafourche Parish (9)

Bayou Country Club, Chackbay, Choctaw, Des Allemands (part; also 2nd; shared with St. Charles Parish), Kraemer, Lafourche Crossing, Raceland (part; also 1st), Thibodaux (part; also 2nd)

St. Martin Parish (9)

All nine communities

St. Mary Parish (12)

All 12 communities

Terrebonne Parish (10)

All ten communities

Vermilion Parish (7)

All seven communities

== Recent election results from statewide races ==
Year	Office	Results
2008	President	McCain 66% - 32%
2012	President	Romney 69% - 31%
2014	Senate	Cassidy 67% - 33%
2015	Governor	Vitter 53% - 47%
2015	Lt. Governor	Nungesser 66% - 34%
2016	President	Trump 70% - 27%
2016	Senate	Kennedy 75% - 25%
2019	Governor	Rispone 63% - 37%
2019	Lt. Governor	Nungesser 78% - 22%
2019	Attorney General	Landry 77% - 23%
2020	President	Trump 70% - 28%
2023	Attorney General	Murrill 79% - 21%
2024	President	Trump 72% - 27%

== List of members representing the district ==
Member (Residence)	Party	Years	Cong ress	Electoral history	District location
District created March 4, 1823
William Leigh Brent (St. Martinville)	Democratic-Republican	March 4, 1823 – March 3, 1825	18th 19th 20th	Elected in 1822. Re-elected in 1824. Re-elected in 1826. Retired.	1823–1833; Avoyelles, Catahoula, Concordia, Natchitoches, Ouachita, Rapides, Saint Landry, Saint Martin, and Saint Mary parishes
William Leigh Brent (St. Martinville)	Anti-Jacksonian	March 4, 1825 – March 3, 1829	18th 19th 20th	Elected in 1822. Re-elected in 1824. Re-elected in 1826. Retired.	1823–1833; Avoyelles, Catahoula, Concordia, Natchitoches, Ouachita, Rapides, Saint Landry, Saint Martin, and Saint Mary parishes
Walter Hampden Overton (Alexandria)	Jacksonian	March 4, 1829 – March 3, 1831	21st	Elected in 1828. Retired.	1823–1833; Avoyelles, Catahoula, Concordia, Natchitoches, Ouachita, Rapides, Saint Landry, Saint Martin, and Saint Mary parishes
Henry Adams Bullard (Alexandria)	Anti-Jacksonian	March 4, 1831 – January 4, 1834	22nd 23rd	Elected in 1830. Re-elected in 1832. Resigned to become judge of Supreme Court of Louisiana.	1823–1833; Avoyelles, Catahoula, Concordia, Natchitoches, Ouachita, Rapides, Saint Landry, Saint Martin, and Saint Mary parishes
Henry Adams Bullard (Alexandria)	Anti-Jacksonian	March 4, 1831 – January 4, 1834	22nd 23rd	Elected in 1830. Re-elected in 1832. Resigned to become judge of Supreme Court of Louisiana.	1833–1843 [data missing]
Vacant		January 4, 1834 – April 28, 1834	23rd		1833–1843 [data missing]
Rice Garland (Opelousas)	Anti-Jacksonian	April 28, 1834 – March 3, 1837	23rd 24th 25th 26th	Elected to finish Bullard's term. Re-elected later in 1834. Re-elected in 1836. Re-elected in 1838. Resigned to become judge of Supreme Court of Louisiana.	1833–1843 [data missing]
Rice Garland (Opelousas)	Whig	March 4, 1837 – July 21, 1840	23rd 24th 25th 26th	Elected to finish Bullard's term. Re-elected later in 1834. Re-elected in 1836. Re-elected in 1838. Resigned to become judge of Supreme Court of Louisiana.	1833–1843 [data missing]
Vacant		July 21, 1840 – December 17, 1840	26th		1833–1843 [data missing]
John Moore (Franklin)	Whig	December 17, 1840 – March 3, 1843	26th 27th	Elected to finish Garland's term. Re-elected later in 1840. Lost re-election.	1833–1843 [data missing]
John Bennett Dawson (St. Francisville)	Democratic	March 4, 1843 – June 26, 1845	28th 29th	Redistricted from the 2nd district and re-elected in 1842. Re-elected in 1844. Died.	1843–1853 [data missing]
John Henry Harmanson (Simmsport)	Democratic	December 1, 1845 – October 24, 1850	29th 30th 31st	Elected to finish Dawson's term. Re-elected in 1846. Re-elected in 1848. Died.	1843–1853 [data missing]
Vacant		October 24, 1850 – December 30, 1850	31st		1843–1853 [data missing]
Alexander Gordon Penn (Covington)	Democratic	December 30, 1850 – March 3, 1853	31st 32nd	Elected to finish Harmanson's term. Also elected to the next full term. Retired.	1843–1853 [data missing]
John Perkins Jr. (Ashwood)	Democratic	March 4, 1853 – March 3, 1855	33rd	Elected in 1852. Retired.	1853–1861 [data missing]
Thomas Green Davidson (Baton Rouge)	Democratic	March 4, 1855 – March 3, 1861	34th 35th 36th	Elected in 1854. Re-elected in 1856. Re-elected in 1858. Withdrew due to onset of Civil War.	1853–1861 [data missing]
Vacant		March 3, 1861 – July 18, 1868	36th 37th 38th 39th 40th	Civil War and Reconstruction	
Joseph Parkinson Newsham (St. Francisville)	Republican	July 18, 1868 – March 3, 1869	40th	Elected to finish the vacant term. Redistricted to the 4th district	1868–1873 [data missing]
Chester Bidwell Darrall (Brashear)	Republican	March 4, 1869 – February 20, 1878	41st 42nd 43rd 44th 45th	Elected in 1868. Re-elected in 1870. Re-elected in 1872. Re-elected in 1874. Re-elected in 1876. Lost election contest.	1868–1873 [data missing]
Chester Bidwell Darrall (Brashear)	Republican	March 4, 1869 – February 20, 1878	41st 42nd 43rd 44th 45th	Elected in 1868. Re-elected in 1870. Re-elected in 1872. Re-elected in 1874. Re-elected in 1876. Lost election contest.	1873–1883 [data missing]
Joseph H. Acklen (Franklin)	Democratic	February 20, 1878 – March 3, 1881	45th 46th	Won election contest. Re-elected in 1878. Retired.	1873–1883 [data missing]
Chester Bidwell Darrall (Morgan City)	Republican	March 4, 1881 – March 3, 1883	47th	Elected in 1880. Lost re-election.	1873–1883 [data missing]
William Pitt Kellogg (New Orleans)	Republican	March 4, 1883 – March 3, 1885	48th	Elected in 1882. Lost re-election.	1883–1893 [data missing]
Edward James Gay (Plaquemine)	Democratic	March 4, 1885 – May 30, 1889	49th 50th 51st	Elected in 1884. Re-elected in 1886. Re-elected in 1888. Died.	1883–1893 [data missing]
Vacant		May 30, 1889 – December 2, 1889	51st		1883–1893 [data missing]
Andrew Price (Thibodaux)	Democratic	December 2, 1889 – March 3, 1897	51st 52nd 53rd 54th	Elected to finish Gay's term. Re-elected in 1890. Re-elected in 1892. Re-elected in 1894. Retired.	1883–1893 [data missing]
Andrew Price (Thibodaux)	Democratic	December 2, 1889 – March 3, 1897	51st 52nd 53rd 54th	Elected to finish Gay's term. Re-elected in 1890. Re-elected in 1892. Re-elected in 1894. Retired.	1893–1903 [data missing]
Robert Foligny Broussard (New Iberia)	Democratic	March 4, 1897 – March 3, 1915	55th 56th 57th 58th 59th 60th 61st 62nd 63rd	Elected in 1896. Re-elected in 1898. Re-elected in 1900. Re-elected in 1902. Re-elected in 1904. Re-elected in 1906. Re-elected in 1908. Re-elected in 1910. Re-elected in 1912. Retired to run for U.S. senator.	1893–1903 [data missing]
Robert Foligny Broussard (New Iberia)	Democratic	March 4, 1897 – March 3, 1915	55th 56th 57th 58th 59th 60th 61st 62nd 63rd	Elected in 1896. Re-elected in 1898. Re-elected in 1900. Re-elected in 1902. Re-elected in 1904. Re-elected in 1906. Re-elected in 1908. Re-elected in 1910. Re-elected in 1912. Retired to run for U.S. senator.	1903–1913 [data missing]
Robert Foligny Broussard (New Iberia)	Democratic	March 4, 1897 – March 3, 1915	55th 56th 57th 58th 59th 60th 61st 62nd 63rd	Elected in 1896. Re-elected in 1898. Re-elected in 1900. Re-elected in 1902. Re-elected in 1904. Re-elected in 1906. Re-elected in 1908. Re-elected in 1910. Re-elected in 1912. Retired to run for U.S. senator.	1913–1923 [data missing]
Whitmell P. Martin (Thibodaux)	Progressive	March 4, 1915 – March 3, 1919	64th 65th 66th 67th 68th 69th 70th 71st	Elected in 1914. Re-elected in 1916. Re-elected in 1918. Re-elected in 1920. Re-elected in 1922. Re-elected in 1924. Re-elected in 1926. Re-elected in 1928. Died.	1913–1923 [data missing]
Whitmell P. Martin (Thibodaux)	Democratic	March 4, 1919 – April 6, 1929	64th 65th 66th 67th 68th 69th 70th 71st	Elected in 1914. Re-elected in 1916. Re-elected in 1918. Re-elected in 1920. Re-elected in 1922. Re-elected in 1924. Re-elected in 1926. Re-elected in 1928. Died.	1913–1923 [data missing]
Whitmell P. Martin (Thibodaux)	Democratic	March 4, 1919 – April 6, 1929	64th 65th 66th 67th 68th 69th 70th 71st	Elected in 1914. Re-elected in 1916. Re-elected in 1918. Re-elected in 1920. Re-elected in 1922. Re-elected in 1924. Re-elected in 1926. Re-elected in 1928. Died.	1923–1933 [data missing]
Numa Francois Montet (Thibodaux)	Democratic	August 6, 1929 – January 3, 1937	71st 72nd 73rd 74th	Elected to finish Martin's term. Re-elected in 1930. Re-elected in 1932. Re-elected in 1934. Lost renomination.	1923–1933 [data missing]
Numa Francois Montet (Thibodaux)	Democratic	August 6, 1929 – January 3, 1937	71st 72nd 73rd 74th	Elected to finish Martin's term. Re-elected in 1930. Re-elected in 1932. Re-elected in 1934. Lost renomination.	1933–1943 [data missing]
Robert L. Mouton (Lafayette)	Democratic	January 3, 1937 – January 3, 1941	75th 76th	Elected in 1936. Re-elected in 1938. Lost renomination.	1933–1943 [data missing]
James Domengeaux (Lafayette)	Democratic	January 3, 1941 – April 15, 1944	77th 78th	Elected in 1940. Re-elected in 1942. Resigned to join the Armed Forces.	1933–1943 [data missing]
James Domengeaux (Lafayette)	Democratic	January 3, 1941 – April 15, 1944	77th 78th	Elected in 1940. Re-elected in 1942. Resigned to join the Armed Forces.	1943–1953 [data missing]
Vacant		April 15, 1944 – November 7, 1944	78th		1943–1953 [data missing]
James Domengeaux (Lafayette)	Democratic	November 7, 1944 – January 3, 1949	78th 79th 80th	Elected to finish his own term. Also elected to the next full term. Re-elected in 1946. Retired to run for U.S. senator.	1943–1953 [data missing]
Edwin E. Willis (St. Martinville)	Democratic	January 3, 1949 – January 3, 1969	81st 82nd 83rd 84th 85th 86th 87th 88th 89th 90th	Elected in 1948. Re-elected in 1950. Re-elected in 1952. Re-elected in 1954. Re-elected in 1956. Re-elected in 1958. Re-elected in 1960. Re-elected in 1962. Re-elected in 1964. Re-elected in 1966. Lost renomination.	1943–1953 [data missing]
Edwin E. Willis (St. Martinville)	Democratic	January 3, 1949 – January 3, 1969	81st 82nd 83rd 84th 85th 86th 87th 88th 89th 90th	Elected in 1948. Re-elected in 1950. Re-elected in 1952. Re-elected in 1954. Re-elected in 1956. Re-elected in 1958. Re-elected in 1960. Re-elected in 1962. Re-elected in 1964. Re-elected in 1966. Lost renomination.	1953–1963 [data missing]
Edwin E. Willis (St. Martinville)	Democratic	January 3, 1949 – January 3, 1969	81st 82nd 83rd 84th 85th 86th 87th 88th 89th 90th	Elected in 1948. Re-elected in 1950. Re-elected in 1952. Re-elected in 1954. Re-elected in 1956. Re-elected in 1958. Re-elected in 1960. Re-elected in 1962. Re-elected in 1964. Re-elected in 1966. Lost renomination.	1963–1973 [data missing]
Patrick T. Caffery (New Iberia)	Democratic	January 3, 1969 – January 3, 1973	91st 92nd	Elected in 1968. Re-elected in 1970. Retired.	1963–1973 [data missing]
Dave Treen (Metairie)	Republican	January 3, 1973 – March 10, 1980	93rd 94th 95th 96th	Elected in 1972. Re-elected in 1974. Re-elected in 1976. Re-elected in 1978. Resigned when elected governor.	1973–1983 [data missing]
Vacant		March 10, 1980 – May 22, 1980	96th		1973–1983 [data missing]
Billy Tauzin (Thibodaux)	Democratic	May 22, 1980 – August 8, 1995	96th 97th 98th 99th 100th 101st 102nd 103rd 104th 105th 106th 107th 108th	Elected to finish Treen's term. Re-elected later in 1980. Re-elected in 1982. Re-elected in 1984. Re-elected in 1986. Re-elected in 1988. Re-elected in 1990. Re-elected in 1992. Re-elected in 1994. Re-elected in 1996. Re-elected in 1998. Re-elected in 2000. Re-elected in 2002. Retired.	1973–1983 [data missing]
Billy Tauzin (Thibodaux)	Democratic	May 22, 1980 – August 8, 1995	96th 97th 98th 99th 100th 101st 102nd 103rd 104th 105th 106th 107th 108th	Elected to finish Treen's term. Re-elected later in 1980. Re-elected in 1982. Re-elected in 1984. Re-elected in 1986. Re-elected in 1988. Re-elected in 1990. Re-elected in 1992. Re-elected in 1994. Re-elected in 1996. Re-elected in 1998. Re-elected in 2000. Re-elected in 2002. Retired.	1983–1993 [data missing]
Billy Tauzin (Thibodaux)	Democratic	May 22, 1980 – August 8, 1995	96th 97th 98th 99th 100th 101st 102nd 103rd 104th 105th 106th 107th 108th	Elected to finish Treen's term. Re-elected later in 1980. Re-elected in 1982. Re-elected in 1984. Re-elected in 1986. Re-elected in 1988. Re-elected in 1990. Re-elected in 1992. Re-elected in 1994. Re-elected in 1996. Re-elected in 1998. Re-elected in 2000. Re-elected in 2002. Retired.	1993–2003 [data missing]
Billy Tauzin (Thibodaux)	Republican	August 8, 1995 – January 3, 2005	96th 97th 98th 99th 100th 101st 102nd 103rd 104th 105th 106th 107th 108th	Elected to finish Treen's term. Re-elected later in 1980. Re-elected in 1982. Re-elected in 1984. Re-elected in 1986. Re-elected in 1988. Re-elected in 1990. Re-elected in 1992. Re-elected in 1994. Re-elected in 1996. Re-elected in 1998. Re-elected in 2000. Re-elected in 2002. Retired.	1993–2003 [data missing]
Billy Tauzin (Thibodaux)	Republican	August 8, 1995 – January 3, 2005	96th 97th 98th 99th 100th 101st 102nd 103rd 104th 105th 106th 107th 108th	Elected to finish Treen's term. Re-elected later in 1980. Re-elected in 1982. Re-elected in 1984. Re-elected in 1986. Re-elected in 1988. Re-elected in 1990. Re-elected in 1992. Re-elected in 1994. Re-elected in 1996. Re-elected in 1998. Re-elected in 2000. Re-elected in 2002. Retired.	2003–2013
Charlie Melançon (Napoleonville)	Democratic	January 3, 2005 – January 3, 2011	109th 110th 111th	Elected in 2004. Re-elected in 2006. Re-elected in 2008. Retired to run for U.S. senator.	2003–2013
Jeff Landry (New Iberia)	Republican	January 3, 2011 – January 3, 2013	112th	Elected in 2010. Lost re-election.	2003–2013
Charles Boustany (Lafayette)	Republican	January 3, 2013 – January 3, 2017	113th 114th	Redistricted from the 7th district and re-elected in 2012. Re-elected in 2014. Retired to run for U.S. senator.	2013–2023
Clay Higgins (Lafayette)	Republican	January 3, 2017 – present	115th 116th 117th 118th 119th	Elected in 2016. Re-elected in 2018. Re-elected in 2020. Re-elected in 2022. Re-elected in 2024. Re-elected in 2026.	2013–2023
Clay Higgins (Lafayette)	Republican	January 3, 2017 – present	115th 116th 117th 118th 119th	Elected in 2016. Re-elected in 2018. Re-elected in 2020. Re-elected in 2022. Re-elected in 2024. Re-elected in 2026.	2023–2025
Clay Higgins (Lafayette)	Republican	January 3, 2017 – present	115th 116th 117th 118th 119th	Elected in 2016. Re-elected in 2018. Re-elected in 2020. Re-elected in 2022. Re-elected in 2024. Re-elected in 2026.	2025–present

== Recent election results ==
=== 2002 ===
Louisiana's 3rd Congressional District Election (2002)
Party	Candidate	Votes	%
Republican	Billy Tauzin II (Incumbent)	130,323	86.68
Libertarian	William Beier	12,964	8.62
Independent	David Iwancio	7,055	4.69
Total votes		150,342	100.00
Turnout			44.2
Republican hold			

=== 2004 ===
Louisiana's 3rd Congressional District Runoff Election (December 4, 2004)
Party	Candidate	Votes	%
Democratic	Charlie Melançon	57,611	50.25
Republican	Billy Tauzin III	57,042	49.75
Total votes		114,653	100.00
Turnout			27.8
Democratic gain from Republican			

=== 2006 ===
Louisiana's 3rd Congressional District Election (2006)
Party	Candidate	Votes	%
Democratic	Charlie Melançon (Incumbent)	75,023	55.03
Republican	Craig F. Romero	54,950	40.31
Democratic	Olangee Breech	4,190	3.07
Libertarian	James Lee Blake Jr.	2,168	1.59
Total votes		136,331	100.00
Turnout			34.4
Democratic hold			

=== 2008 ===
Louisiana's 3rd Congressional District Election (2008)
Party	Candidate	Votes	%
Democratic	Charlie Melançon (Incumbent)		100.00
Total votes			100.00
Turnout			
Democratic hold			

=== 2010 ===
Louisiana's 3rd Congressional District Election (2010)
Party	Candidate	Votes	%
Republican	Jeff Landry	108,963	63.77
Democratic	Ravi Sangisetty	61,914	36.23
Total votes		170,877	100.00
Turnout			44.8
Republican gain from Democratic			

=== 2012 ===
Louisiana's 3rd Congressional District Election (2012)
Party	Candidate	Votes	%
Republican	Charles Boustany	58,820	60.90
Republican	Jeff Landry	37,764	39.10
Total votes		96,584	100.00
Turnout			19.3
Republican hold			

=== 2014 ===
Louisiana's 3rd Congressional District Election (2014)
Party	Candidate	Votes	%
Republican	Charles Boustany (incumbent)	185,867	79
Republican	Bryan Barrilleaux	22,059	9
No Party	Russell Richard	28,342	12
Total votes		236,268	100.00
Turnout			51.1
Republican hold			

=== 2016 ===
Louisiana's 3rd Congressional district election, 2016
Party	Candidate	Votes	%
Republican	Clay Higgins	77,671	56.1
Republican	Scott Angelle	60,762	43.9
Total votes		138,433	100
Turnout			28.1
Republican hold			

=== 2018 ===
Louisiana's 3rd Congressional district election, 2018
Party	Candidate	Votes	%
Republican	Clay Higgins (incumbent)	136,876	55.7
Democratic	Mildred Methvin	43,729	17.8
Republican	Josh Guillory	31,387	12.8
Democratic	Rob Anderson	13,477	5.5
Democratic	Larry Rader	9,692	3.9
Democratic	Verone Thomas	7,815	3.2
Libertarian	Aaron Andrus	2,967	1.2
Total votes		245,943	100
Republican hold			

=== 2020 ===
Louisiana's 3rd congressional district, 2020
Party	Candidate	Votes	%
Republican	Clay Higgins (incumbent)	230,480	67.76
Democratic	Braylon Harris	60,852	17.89
Democratic	Rob Anderson	39,423	11.59
Libertarian	Brandon Leleux	9,365	2.75
Total votes		340,120	100.0
Republican hold			

=== 2022 ===
Louisiana's 3rd congressional district, 2022
Party	Candidate	Votes	%
Republican	Clay Higgins (incumbent)	144,423	64.3
Republican	Holden Hoggatt	24,474	10.9
Democratic	Lessie Olivia Leblanc	23,641	10.5
Democratic	Tia LeBrun	21,172	9.4
Republican	Thomas "Lane" Payne, Jr.	4,012	1.8
Independent	Gloria R. Wiggins	3,255	1.4
Republican	Jacob "Jake" Shaheen	1,955	0.9
Libertarian	Guy McLendon	1,620	0.7
Total votes		224,552	100.0
Republican hold			

=== 2024 ===
Louisiana's 3rd congressional district, 2024
Party	Candidate	Votes	%
Republican	Clay Higgins (incumbent)	226,279	70.6
Democratic	Priscilla Gonzalez	59,834	18.7
Democratic	Sadi Summerlin	21,323	6.6
Republican	Xan John	13,246	4.1
Total votes		320,682	100.0
Republican hold			

== See also ==
- Louisiana's congressional districts
- List of United States congressional districts

== Sources ==
- Martis, Kenneth C. (1989). The Historical Atlas of Political Parties in the United States Congress. New York: Macmillan Publishing Company.
- Martis, Kenneth C. (1982). The Historical Atlas of United States Congressional Districts. New York: Macmillan Publishing Company.
- Congressional Biographical Directory of the United States 1774–present, bioguide.congress.gov; accessed November 18, 2016.
