= Numa F. Montet =

American politician (1892–1985)

Numa François Montet
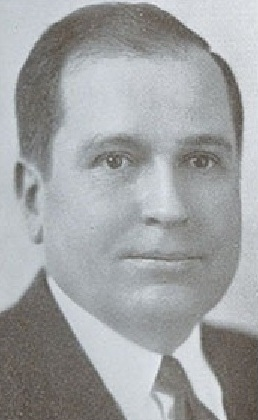
- From 1935's Pictorial Directory of 74th Congress

Member of the U.S. House of Representatives from Louisiana's 3rd district
- In office August 6, 1929 – January 3, 1937
- Preceded by: Whitmell P. Martin
- Succeeded by: Robert L. Mouton

Member of the Louisiana House of Representatives
- In office 1916–1920

Secretary-Treasurer of Thibodaux
- In office 1914–1914

City Attorney of Thibodaux
- In office 1915–1915

Personal details
- Born: September 17, 1892 Thibodaux, Lafourche Parish, Louisiana, U.S.
- Died: October 12, 1985 (aged 93) Thibodaux, Louisiana, U.S.
- Resting place: Assumption Catholic Cemetery, Plattenville, Louisiana
- Party: Democratic
- Education: Louisiana State Normal College, Tulane University Law School
- Profession: Lawyer, Politician

Numa François Montet (September 17, 1892 – October 12, 1985) was a U.S. representative from Louisiana.

Born in Thibodaux, Lafourche Parish, Louisiana, Montet attended the common schools and Louisiana State Normal College at Natchitoches. He was graduated from the law department of Tulane University, New Orleans, Louisiana, in 1913. He was admitted to the bar the same year and commenced practice in Franklin, Louisiana. He served as secretary-treasurer of the city of Thibodaux in 1914 and as city attorney in 1915. He served as a member of the State house of representatives 1916-1920. He was an unsuccessful candidate for attorney general of Louisiana in 1924. He served as a delegate to the Democratic National Conventions in 1924 and 1932. Acting prosecuting attorney for the twentieth judicial district of Louisiana in 1925. He served as general counsel for State highway commission in 1928 and 1929.

Montet was elected as a Democrat to the Seventy-first Congress to fill the vacancy caused by the death of Whitmell P. Martin. In the special election, Montet defeated a Republican, M. E. Norman, 11,460 (57.7 percent) to 8,399 (42.3 percent). The Republicans finally won this House seat in 1972 but lost it again in 1980.

Montet was reelected to the Seventy-second, Seventy-third, and Seventy-fourth Congresses and served from August 6, 1929, to January 3, 1937. He was an unsuccessful candidate for renomination in 1936. He resumed the practice of law in Thibodaux, Louisiana, where he resided until his death there at the age of 93 on October 12, 1985. He was interred in Assumption Catholic Cemetery, Plattenville, Louisiana.

U.S. House of Representatives
Preceded by Whitmell P. Martin	Member of the U.S. House of Representatives from Louisiana's 3rd congressional district 1929-1937	Succeeded by Robert L. Mouton
