= Walter Hampden Overton =

United States Army officer and politician

- Born: 1788; Louisa Court House, Virginia
- Died: December 24, 1845 (aged 56–57); Alexandria, Louisiana
- Military career
- Allegiance: United States
- Branch: United States Army
- Service years: 1808–1815
- Rank: Major General
- Unit: 3rd Regiment of Riflemen
- Conflicts: War of 1812: Battle of New Orleans; Siege of Fort St. Philip
- Other work: politician

Major General Walter Hampden Overton (1788 – December 24, 1845) was a United States Army officer and politician who represented Louisiana's 3rd congressional district in the 21st United States Congress.

== Early life and army career ==
He was born near Louisa Court House, Virginia in 1788. His father Thomas Overton moved the family to North Carolina when Walter was an infant, and then moved to Tennessee in 1801. Overton attended the common schools. He joined the United States Army in 1808, and served in the War of 1812. He rose through the ranks to major in the 3rd Regiment of Riflemen on February 21, 1814. Overton was the commanding officer of the 135-strong garrison of Fort Saint Phillips during the final months of the war. His men prevented five Royal Navy ships from passing by the fort between 9 and 18 January 1815.

For his service below New Orleans, Overton was promoted to brevet lieutenant colonel on December 23, 1814, for actions at the Battle of New Orleans, and transferred to the Artillery Corps in May 1815 before resigning his commission on October 31, 1815. Later, he was commissioned a major general of militia by the Louisiana Legislature. Overton settled near Alexandria, Louisiana in Rapides Parish and served as a member of courthouse building commission in 1820 and 1821, a member of the Commission on Navigation of Bayou Rapides in 1824.

== Political career ==
Overton was elected as a Jacksonian Democrat — his father had served as Andrew Jackson's second in his duel with Charles Dickinson — to the 21st United States Congress (March 4, 1829 – March 3, 1831). He succeeded three-term Whig William Leigh Brent, whose son James Fenwick Brent (1814-1847) married his daughter Laura Harriet Overton (1822-1844). General Overton served one term and was not a candidate for renomination in 1830.

He returned to his plantation near Alexandria, Louisiana where he died on December 24, 1845.

== Death and legacy ==
He was buried in McNutt Hill Cemetery in Rapides Parish. Thomas Overton Moore, Governor of Louisiana from 1860 to 1864, was his nephew; and the politician John Holmes Overton was his grandson. The politician Overton Brooks was his great-grandson.

== Sources ==
- Watson, Samuel J. (2012). Jackson's Sword: The Army Officer Corps on the American Frontier, 1810–1821. Modern War Studies. Lawrence: University Press of Kansas. ISBN 978-0-7006-1884-2. LCCN 2012027879. OCLC 788282695.

U.S. House of Representatives
Preceded by William Leigh Brent	Member of the U.S. House of Representatives from Louisiana's 3rd congressional district 1829 – 1831	Succeeded by Henry Adams Bullard
