= Travellers Rest (Nashville, Tennessee) =

Historic house in Tennessee, United States

- Travellers' Rest
- U.S. National Register of Historic Places
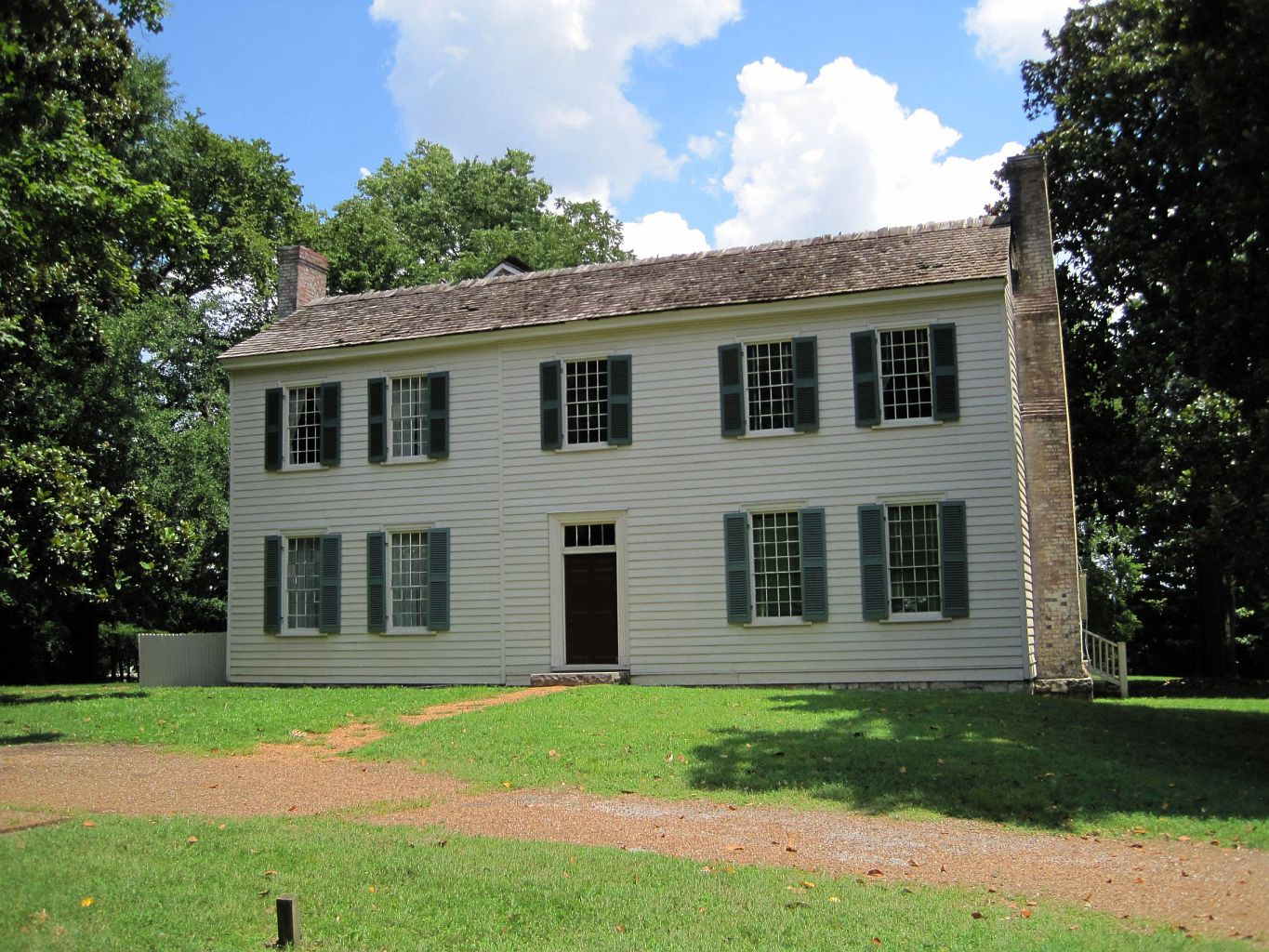

- Location within Tennessee Location within the United States
- Location: Franklin Rd., Oak Hill, Nashville, Tennessee
- Coordinates: 36°4′37″N 86°45′49.3″W
- Area: 9 acres (3.6 ha)
- Built: 1799
- Architectural style: Vernacular Federal
- NRHP reference No.: 69000179
- Added to NRHP: December 30, 1969

Travellers Rest, also known as Golgotha, is a former plantation and historic plantation house, located in Nashville, Tennessee. The first owner of the site was John Overton in 1796, who built the first family home in 1799. For many years this plantation was worked and maintained by enslaved Black people.

It has been listed on the National Register of Historic Places since December 30, 1969, for its 18th century agricultural, political, and military history significance.

== History ==
In 1799 the two-story structure with four rooms was built by politician and judge John Overton (1766–1833). Overton was an advisor and close friend of Andrew Jackson, a judge at the Superior Court of Tennessee, and cofounder of the city of Memphis, Tennessee. Overton originally named the property Golgotha after the large number of prehistoric skulls that were unearthed while digging the cellar of the house. Archaeologists now know that these remains were part of a large Mississippian village site. Overton changed the name of the plantation to Travellers Rest in the early 19th century to reflect the recreational effect his home had on him after the long rides on horseback that he had to undertake as a circuit judge. Overton died at Travellers Rest on April 12, 1833.

An addition was made to the house in 1812, to accommodate members of Overton's family. A long ell was added soon after 1820 when Overton married a widow with five children.

Overton's widow occupied the home until her death in 1862. After her death, her son John and his wife Harriet and their children continued to occupy the home. The plantation's farm, which covered 1,050 acres and was worked by 80 slaves, was valued at several million dollars during this time. A final addition to the house was made in 1887 by John Overton II, when two rooms where added to the ell, one above and one below.

The plantation building was saved from demolition and restored in 1954 to become a museum. Additional archaeological finds were reported from the property as recently as 1995, when construction at the visitors center resulted in disturbance of additional human burials. As of 2008, the Travellers Rest Plantation & Museum houses exhibits that document the life and work of John Overton, the history of the Overton Plantation and Nashville in the Civil War. It is located at 636 Farrell Parkway in Nashville.

== See also ==
- National Register of Historic Places listings in Tennessee
- List of archaeological sites in Tennessee
