= Carrie Burton Overton =

American musician

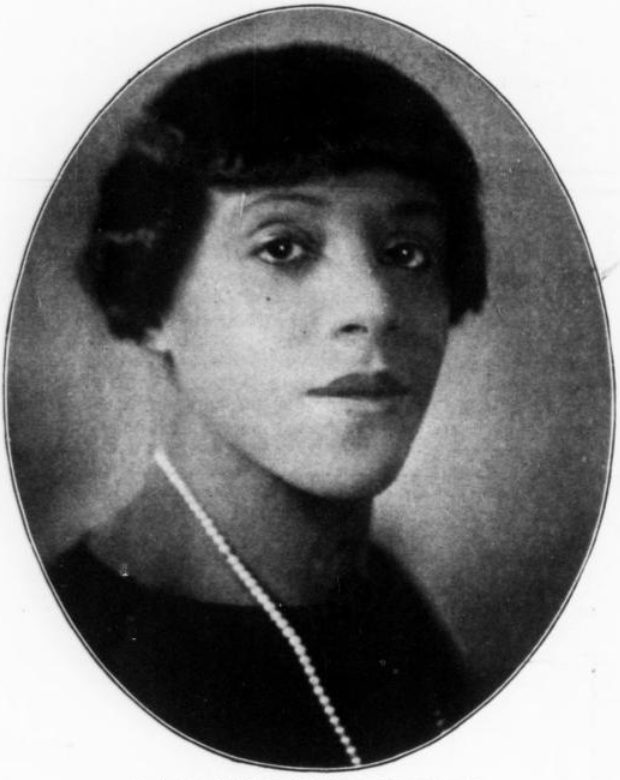
- Carrie Burton Overton, from a 1927 publication
- Born: Carrie R. Burton; July 20, 1888; Wyoming Territory
- Died: December 1975 (age 87); New York, New York, U.S.
- Occupation(s): Pianist, stenographer
- Known for: First Black female student at the University of Wyoming (1903-1907)

Carrie R. Burton Overton (July 20, 1888 – December 1975) was an American musician and stenographer. She was the first Black woman to enroll and study at the University of Wyoming, beginning in 1903.

== Early life and education ==
Carrie Burton was born in Wyoming Territory and raised in Laramie, the daughter of John R. Burton and Catherine Burton Price. Her stepfather Thomas Price was a former Buffalo Soldier. She had an older half-brother, Benny, who drowned when Carrie was 12 years old.

Carrie Burton was the first Black female student to enroll at the University of Wyoming, in 1903, when she was fifteen years old. She earned a stenography certificate and studied piano. She attended Howard University beginning in 1908, with financial help from Jane Ivinson, a white philanthropist who organized a benefit concert for Burton. She earned a music diploma at Howard in 1913, and pursued further studies at the Juilliard School, where she earned a diploma in 1941. She earned a bachelor's degree in 1947 and a master's degree in 1948, both from Columbia University.

== Career ==
Overton worked as an administrative assistant at Howard University, In 1918, with support from the NAACP, she was offered a stenographer job at the U.S. Department of Agriculture, after a similar position at the Council of National Defense was offered, then withdrawn because of her race. She was a secretary who worked for Mary White Ovington of the NAACP, Julian D. Rainey at the Democratic National Committee, and John Haynes Holmes, pastor of the Community Church of New York. She was a member of the Business and Professional Women's Club of New York City, and of the Howard University Club of New York.

Overton also played piano in New York clubs. In 1927, she gave a piano recital and New York's Landay Hall. "Never has the writer heard a pianist of the Negro race offer the public a more dignified and enjoyable program," commented a reviewer in Musical Courier. "The young woman played from memory with poetic appreciation, much brilliancy and intellectual understanding." In 1931, she performed at a concert organized by Alma Vessels John for the Harlem Students' Association. In 1934, she played "a program of Russian music" at the Treble Clef Club in Washington, D.C. She composed an original musical work, now lost, which was performed at the Juilliard School in 1940.

== Personal life ==
Carrie Burton married a fellow Howard University alumnus, educator George W. B. Overton, in 1913. She died in 1975, at the age of 87, in New York City. Overton's papers and photographs are in the Archives of Labor History at Wayne State University.
