= William Overton =

William Overton may refer to:

- William Overton (judge) (1939–1987), United States district court judge
- William Overton (Portland founder), founder of Portland, Oregon
- William Overton (bishop) (1525–1609), bishop of Coventry and Lichfield
- William Overton (cricketer) (1873–1949), English cricketer
- Wil Overton, British artist, specialising in manga styles
- William Whitey Overton (1928–2015), American steeplechaser and long distance runner
