= Volma Overton =

American civil rights activist (1924–2005)

Volma Robert Overton
- Born: September 26, 1924; Maha, Texas, United States
- Died: October 31, 2005 (aged 81); Austin, Texas
- Education: BS in chemistry
- Alma mater: Tillotson College
- Occupations: Civil rights activist, Marine, postmaster
- Employer(s): United States Marine Corps, United States Army Reserves, United States Postal Service
- Known for: Efforts to end racial segregation in Austin schools
- Movement: Civil Rights Movement
- Spouse: Warneta Hill (m. 1946)
- Children: 1 son, 3 daughters
- Relatives: Richard Overton (cousin)

Volma Robert Overton (September 26, 1924 – October 31, 2005) was an African American civil rights activist and president of NAACP's Austin, Texas chapter from 1962 to 1983. He is best known for his legal efforts to end racial segregation in Austin schools.

Overton was born in Maha in the rural southeast of Travis County. He served in the Marines in World War II, then in the Army Reserves, rising to the rank of lieutenant colonel. After World War II, he attended Tillotson College (now part of Huston-Tillotson University) from 1947 to 1950 where he earned a B.S. degree in chemistry with a minor in math. He also met his wife, Warneta while studying there. They had four children, who were often involved in Overton's civil rights work; their daughter DeDra was named the plaintiff in the federal lawsuit he led to desegregate Austin schools. The lawsuit lasted a decade and Overton, backed by the NAACP Legal Defense, the U.S. Justice Department and the Mexican American Legal Defense and Educational Fund, ultimately prevailed.

== Career ==
Volma Overton served in the Marine Corps for two years and the United States Army Reserves for twenty-eight years, then retired. He joined the United States Postal Service and later joined the National Alliance of Postal Workers due to unfair treatment of minorities. Overton then served as a civil rights activist and president of the NAACP's Austin chapter. He then focused his career on confronting zoning and busing issues within the Austin Independent School District (AISD), to ensure that they were made without segregation in mind. Following his life of military and civil action, he then became the first black member of the First Baptist Church of Austin, Texas in 1963 and became a deacon of the church in 1967.

== The AISD Desgregation Plan ==
Although Volma Overton was truly interested in the brutal fight over how to write the Desegregation Plan for the Austin school system, he remained a bystander for most of the time. However, whenever the local branch NAACP attorney, Sam Biscoe, needed help or information on certain topics, he consulted with Volma. All schools in the Austin area were racially segregated, meaning African Americans and Latin Americans were separated from white students. After the Brown v. Board of Education decision in 1954, Volma and the AISD Board of Trustees still were not pleased with the treatment of minorities. In 1968, The Department of Health, Education, and Welfare decided that the AISD was not obeying the Civil Rights Act of 1964 and that more changes needed to be made. The first reaction was to create "one-way busing" for students of color which started in 1971. Judge Jack Roberts ordered the one-way busing of African American students which was then reversed by the Fifth Circuit Court of Appeals in New Orleans. They decided that "no race should have to bear the burden of busing."

On April 15, 1973, the Austin School Board came up with an agreeable desegregation plan after being turned down four times. Some saw this as a huge leap forward while others thought that the final product seemed like it was just agreed upon, not truly written. To some, including Volma, it was believed that it did not address the issues that they wanted but that it benefited minorities "in a way that can be healthy." Two-way busing was introduced in 1979 and lasted till 1986.

Mr. Overton and the NAACP did not only pay attention to the mistreatment of African Americans, but they extended their advocacy to Mexican-Americans to begin to provide a more diverse childhood school experience for more students. In 1976, Volma reached the 14-year milestone as president of the Austin branch so February 13 was declared "Volma Overton Appreciation Day". It was held on a Friday at the Stephen F. Austin Hotel in downtown Austin.

== NAACP activities ==
Volma Overton became the NAACP president of the Austin chapter in 1962. Overton marched alongside Martin Luther King Jr. in the Selma to Montgomery march in 1965. Overton received the Arthur B. DeWitty Award from the NAACP in 1967.

While working with the NAACP, Overton received many complaints about racial bias in the Austin area and was asked for help. For example, John. G. Evans, Jr wrote a letter to Overton and the NAACP Austin Chapter to let them know of his discrimination case against the Veterans Administration, Data Processing Center, Austin, Texas. In his case, Mr. Evans claimed that the VA had discriminated against him by denying him a promotion based on race. Mr. Evans had also requested the help of the N.F.F.E Local union 1745 actually legally represented him in the matter.

== Legacy ==
Volma Overton had an elementary school named after him in 2006 and an award from the NAACP named after him, known as the DeWitty/Overton award. Overton established the first credit union in east Austin and created an annual golf tournament in which the proceeds would provide scholarships for talented minorities.

The Overton House was turned into a community center for African Americans in Austin. The house, which was located on Springdale Road continued to be a beacon to others for help in their struggle for justice and goal to overcome prejudice. Overton was influential in the mentoring program at Oak Spring Elementary, whose goal was to serve mainly low-income minority students.

== Awards ==
- NAACP Arthur B. DeWitty Award (1967)
- Austin Living Legends award from The Villager newspaper (1990)
- Award for Leadership in Civil Rights, awarded by the University of Texas at Austin (2004)

== Death ==
Volma Overton died in 2005. He and his wife Warneta Hill Overton are buried in the Texas State Cemetery.
