= Richard Arvin Overton =

American supercentenarian (1906–2018)

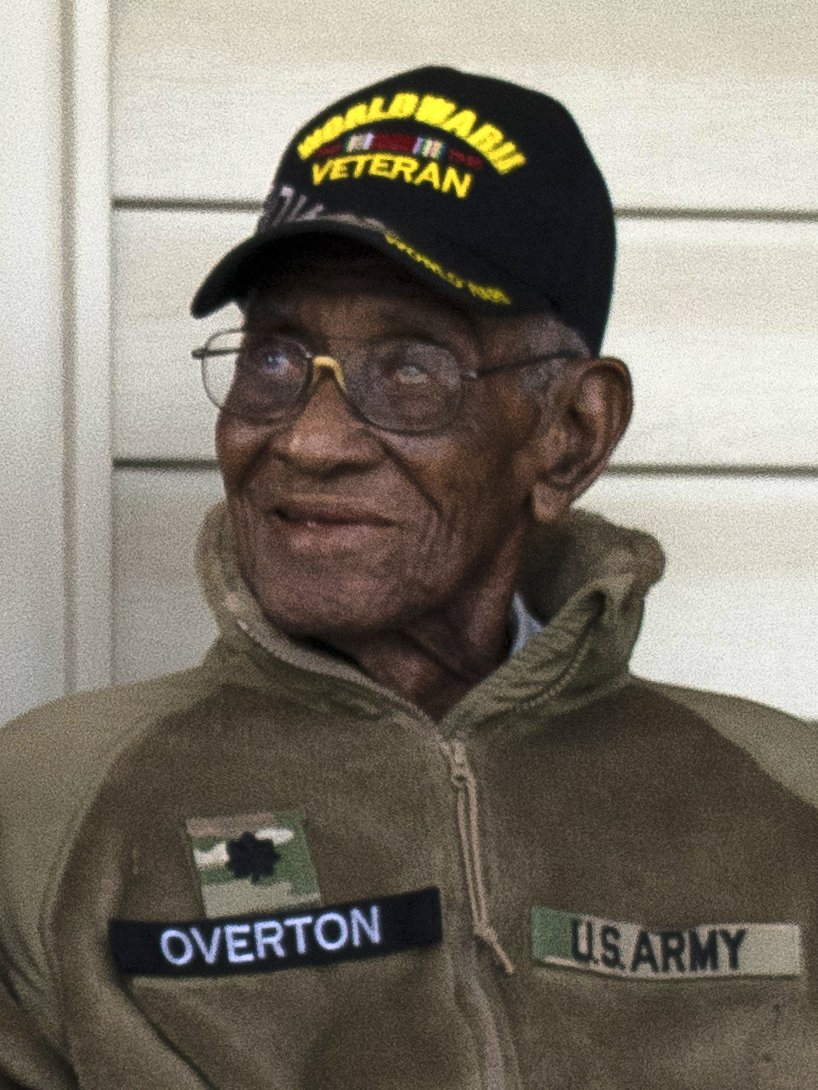
- Overton on Veterans Day 2017
- Born: Richard Arvin Overton; May 11, 1906; Bastrop County, Texas, U.S.
- Died: December 27, 2018 (aged 112 years, 230 days); Austin, Texas, U.S.
- Family: John Overton (great-great-grandfather); Volma Overton (first cousin); William R. Dickinson (third cousin)
- Military career
- Allegiance: United States
- Branch: United States Army
- Service years: 1940–1945
- Rank: Technician fifth grade
- Unit: 188th Engineer Aviation Battalion (Colored)
- Conflicts: World War II: South Pacific Theater
- Awards: Combat Infantryman Badge; Bronze Star Medal; U.S. Army Good Conduct Medal; American Defense Service Medal; American Campaign Medal; Asiatic–Pacific Campaign Medal; World War II Victory Medal; Meritorious Unit Commendation; Expert Rifle Marksmanship Badge

Richard Arvin Overton (May 11, 1906 – December 27, 2018) was an American supercentenarian who at the age of 112 years, 230 days was the oldest verified surviving U.S. World War II veteran and oldest man in the United States. He served in the United States Army. In 2013, he was honored by President Barack Obama. He resided in Austin, Texas, from 1945 until his death in 2018.

== Early life and education ==
Overton was born in Bastrop County, Texas, to Gentry Overton Sr. and Elizabeth Franklin Overton Waters.

Overton's great-great-grandfather was American judge and presidential advisor John Overton. Through this ancestor he was a cousin of civil-rights activist Volma Robert Overton and of William R. Dickinson.

== Military and civilian career ==
Overton enlisted in the United States Army on September 3, 1940, at Fort Sam Houston, Texas.

He served in the South Pacific from 1940 through 1945, including stops in Hawaii, Guam, Palau, and Iwo Jima. He left the U.S. Army in October 1945 as a technician fifth grade.

Overton worked at local furniture stores before taking a position with the Texas Department of the Treasury (now part of the Texas Comptroller of Public Accounts) in Austin.

He was married twice, but did not have any children.

== Later years ==
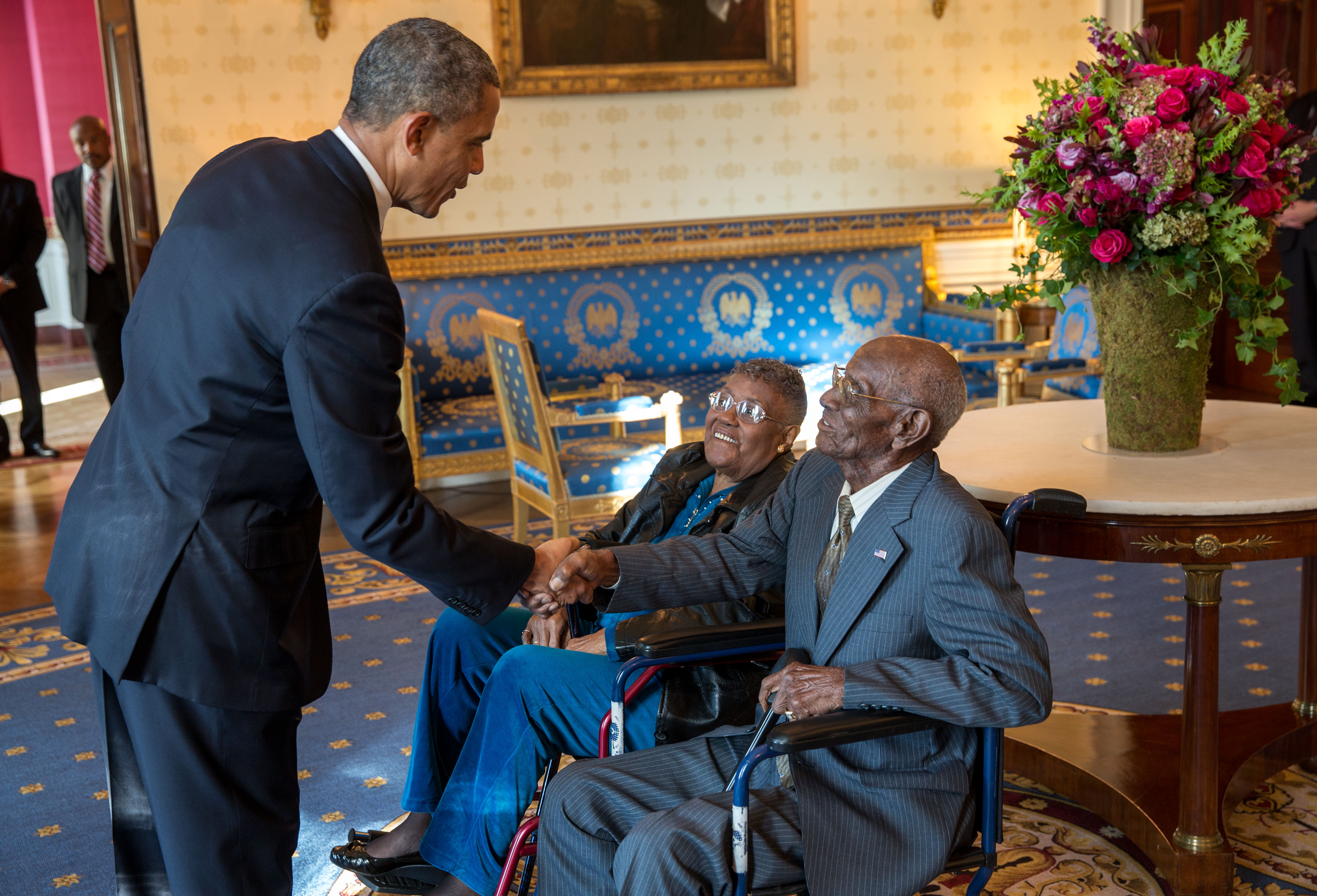
U.S. President Barack Obama greeting Overton in the White House Blue Room, Veterans Day 2013

Overton gained media attention during the 2013 Memorial Day weekend when he told Fox News he would spend his Memorial Day "smoking cigars and drinking whiskey-stiffened coffee." Overton had been known to smoke about a dozen cigars a day. On that same Memorial Day, Overton met with Texas Governor Rick Perry. Overton was also invited to the White House where he met with President Barack Obama, and to the Veterans Day ceremony at Arlington National Cemetery, where he was singled out by name for praise by the President.

During an NBA game between the San Antonio Spurs and the Memphis Grizzlies on March 24, 2017, Overton was honored during a half-time break.

He is the subject of a 2016 documentary, Mr. Overton, in which he is interviewed about his daily routine, thoughts on his longevity, and his military service. On May 3, 2016, he became the oldest surviving American veteran after the death of Frank Levingston.

On May 11, 2016, Overton became a supercentenarian. Following the death of Clarence Matthews (born May 1, 1906) on July 22, 2017, Overton became the oldest living American man. Overton was hospitalized for pneumonia in December 2018. He was placed in a rehabilitation center, where he died on December 27, 2018, aged 112 years and 230 days.

== Military awards ==

Badge	Combat Infantryman Badge			
1st Row	Bronze Star Medal		Army Good Conduct Medal	American Defense Service Medal
2nd Row	American Campaign Medal	Asiatic–Pacific Campaign Medal	World War II Victory Medal	

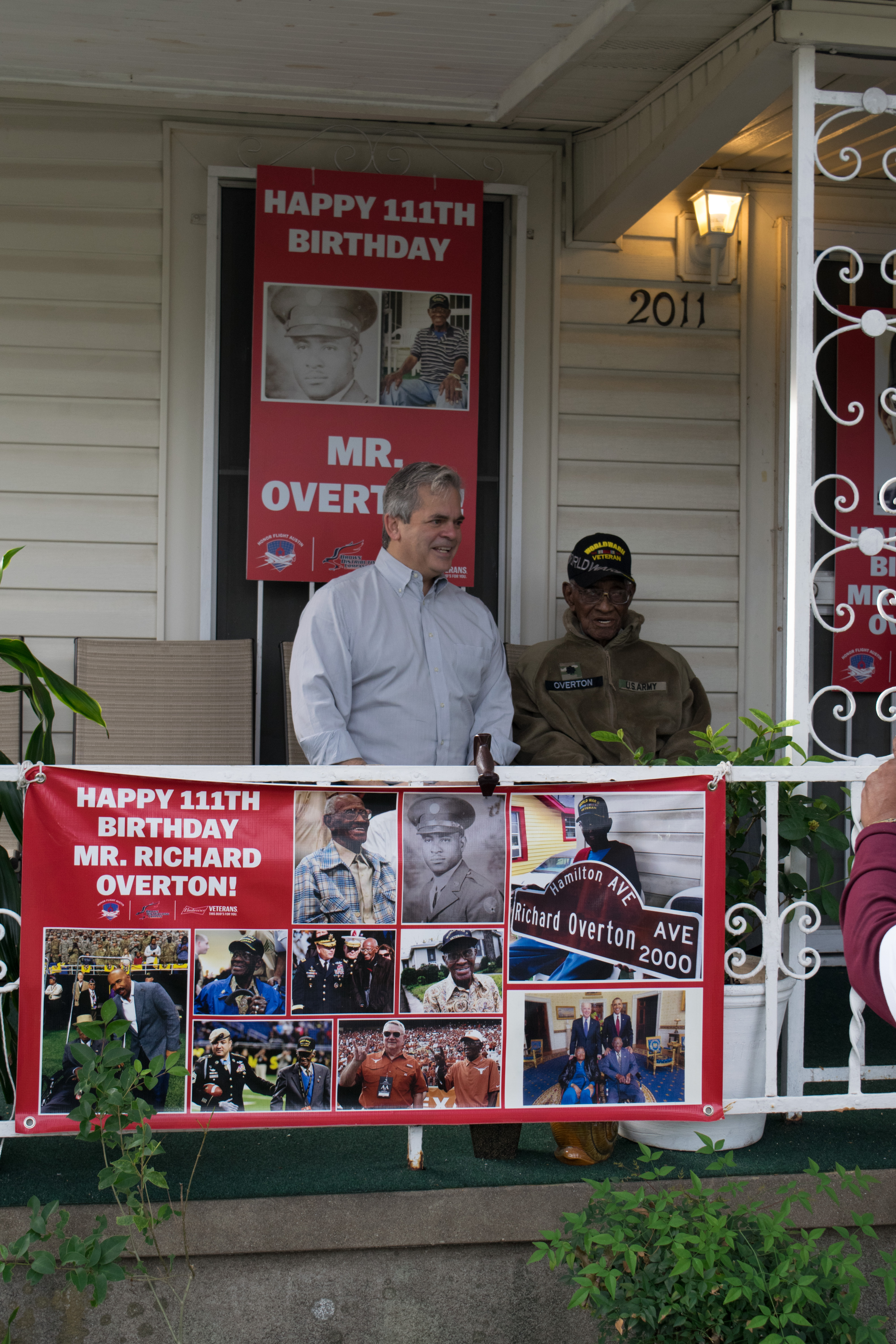
Richard Overton with Austin Mayor Steve Adler before the Veteran's Day Parade

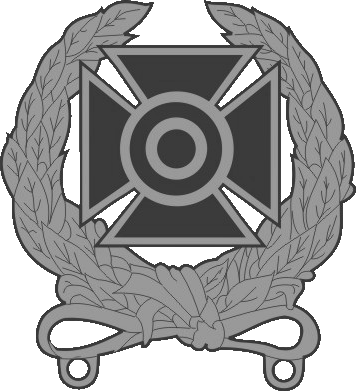

Badge	Expert Rifle Marksmanship Badge

Unit award	Army Meritorious Unit Commendation

== Personal life ==
Overton lived in Austin, Texas. On December 11, 2014, Austin Community College recognized Overton with an honorary associate degree, the college's highest distinction.

He was a member of the Church of Christ and attended church regularly.

On July 1, 2018, it was reported that Overton became a victim of identity theft. A suspect of unknown origin opened a fake banking account with Overton's Social Security number, accessed his personal checking account, and used the money to gather savings bonds. Overton also had a GoFundMe account which raised over $420,000 for his in-home care. On July 5, 2018, Overton's family announced that Bank of America had restored the funds to his account.

After his death, a portion of Airport Boulevard in Austin was named in his honor.

== See also ==
- List of American supercentenarians
- List of the verified oldest people
