= James R. Domengeaux =

American politician (1906–1988)

Jimmy Domengeaux
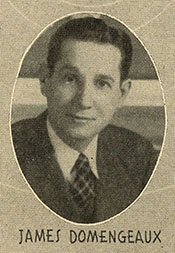

Member of the U.S. House of Representatives from Louisiana's 3rd district
- In office January 3, 1941 – April 15, 1944
- Preceded by: Robert L. Mouton
- In office November 7, 1944 – January 3, 1949
- Succeeded by: Edwin E. Willis

Louisiana State Representative for Lafayette Parish
- In office 1940–1940
- Preceded by: Two-member district: Rexford C. McCullough William A. Montgomery
- Succeeded by: Rufus G. Smith

Personal details
- Born: January 6, 1907 Lafayette, Louisiana, U.S.
- Died: April 11, 1988 (aged 81) Lafayette, Louisiana, U.S.
- Resting place: St. John's Cemetery in Lafayette
- Party: Democratic
- Spouse: Eleanor St. Julien Domengeaux
- Children: None
- Education: University of Louisiana at Lafayette Loyola University New Orleans Tulane University Law School
- Occupation: Attorney

James R. Domengeaux (January 6, 1907 – April 11, 1988) was an American lawyer, politician, and judge who served in the United States House of Representatives for Louisiana's 3rd congressional district from 1941 to 1949. He was a cultural activist of Cajun and Louisiana Creole descent who is best remembered for his efforts to preserve the French language in his native state.

== Early life and career ==
Domengeaux was born on January 6, 1907, in Lafayette, Louisiana to J. Rudolph Domengeaux and the former Marthe Mouton. He attended Mount Carmel Academy and Cathedral High School in Lafayette. He obtained his undergraduate degree from the University of Louisiana at Lafayette (then "Southwestern Louisiana Institute"). He also studied in New Orleans at both Loyola University and Tulane University Law School, from which he received his legal degree in 1931. He was admitted to the bar that same year and launched his law practice in Lafayette.

In 1962, Domengeaux was admitted to practice before the United States Supreme Court. He was senior member of Domengeaux and Wright (1931–1984). The firm maintained offices in Lafayette, New Orleans, Hammond in Tangipahoa Parish, and Opelousas, the seat of St. Landry Parish in south central Louisiana.

== Personal life ==
Domengeaux was married to the former Eleanor St. Julien (1921–2004); they had no children. They are interred at St. John's Cemetery in Lafayette.

== As cultural activist ==
In 1968, Domengeaux accepted an appointment from Louisiana Governor John McKeithen, his fellow Democrat, to preside over a new state-charted organization called the Council for the Development of French in Louisiana, commonly known by the acronym CODOFIL.

As president of CODOFIL, Domengeaux spearheaded a statewide effort to introduce French education in public classrooms from elementary through high school levels. He did so largely by recruiting teachers from France, Belgium, Quebec, and other French-speaking regions and nations around the world. Such recruitment placed Domengeaux at odds with the educational establishment, which preferred the hiring of local teachers.

This effort represented a major shift for Louisiana's educational system, which for decades had punished Cajun children for speaking French in school — a practice that more than any other factor had dramatically reduced the number of native French speakers in the state.

In 1976, Domengeaux arranged for the then French President Valéry Giscard d'Estaing to visit Lafayette.

In the 1980s, Domengeaux embraced a new teaching method: French immersion, in which children were to be taught a variety of subjects in French for 60 percent of the school day. This method replaced the previous, less successful method of teaching French in only thirty-minute daily increments.

In addition to advancing French education, Domengeaux used CODOFIL as a watchdog organization that defended Cajuns from perceived affronts. For example, Domengeaux crusaded against use of the word "coonass," which he considered an ethnic slur against the Cajun people; and he condemned such Cajun humorists as the popular Justin Wilson, who was born not in Acadiana, but in Tangipahoa Parish, one of the "Florida Parishes" east of Baton Rouge, and who disagreed with Domengeaux politically.

A charismatic public figure, Domengeaux was often at odds with detractors, who criticized his reliance on international teachers as well as his emphasis on continental French to the exclusion of Cajun French.

For his efforts to save the French language in Louisiana, Domengeaux received an honorary doctorate from Louisiana State University in Baton Rouge, the Order of the Legion of Honor from the French government, and the Order of the Crown from Belgium, among numerous other citations. On November 11, 1986, coinciding with Veterans Day, Lafayette Mayor William Dudley Lastrapes and Governor Edwin Washington Edwards proclaimed "Jimmy Domengeaux Day". The University of Louisiana at Lafayette created an "Eminent Scholar Chair in Foreign Languages" in Domengeaux's honor.

The organization over which Domengeaux presided for the last two decades of his life, CODOFIL, continues to coordinate French education in Louisiana; and in his honor CODOFIL's supporting foundation offers a scholarship known as the Bourse James Domengeaux (James Domengeaux Scholarship).

U.S. House of Representatives
| Preceded by Robert L. Mouton | U.S. Representative for Louisiana's 3rd congressional district 1941—1949 | Succeeded by Edwin E. Willis |
