= 3rd Regiment of Riflemen =

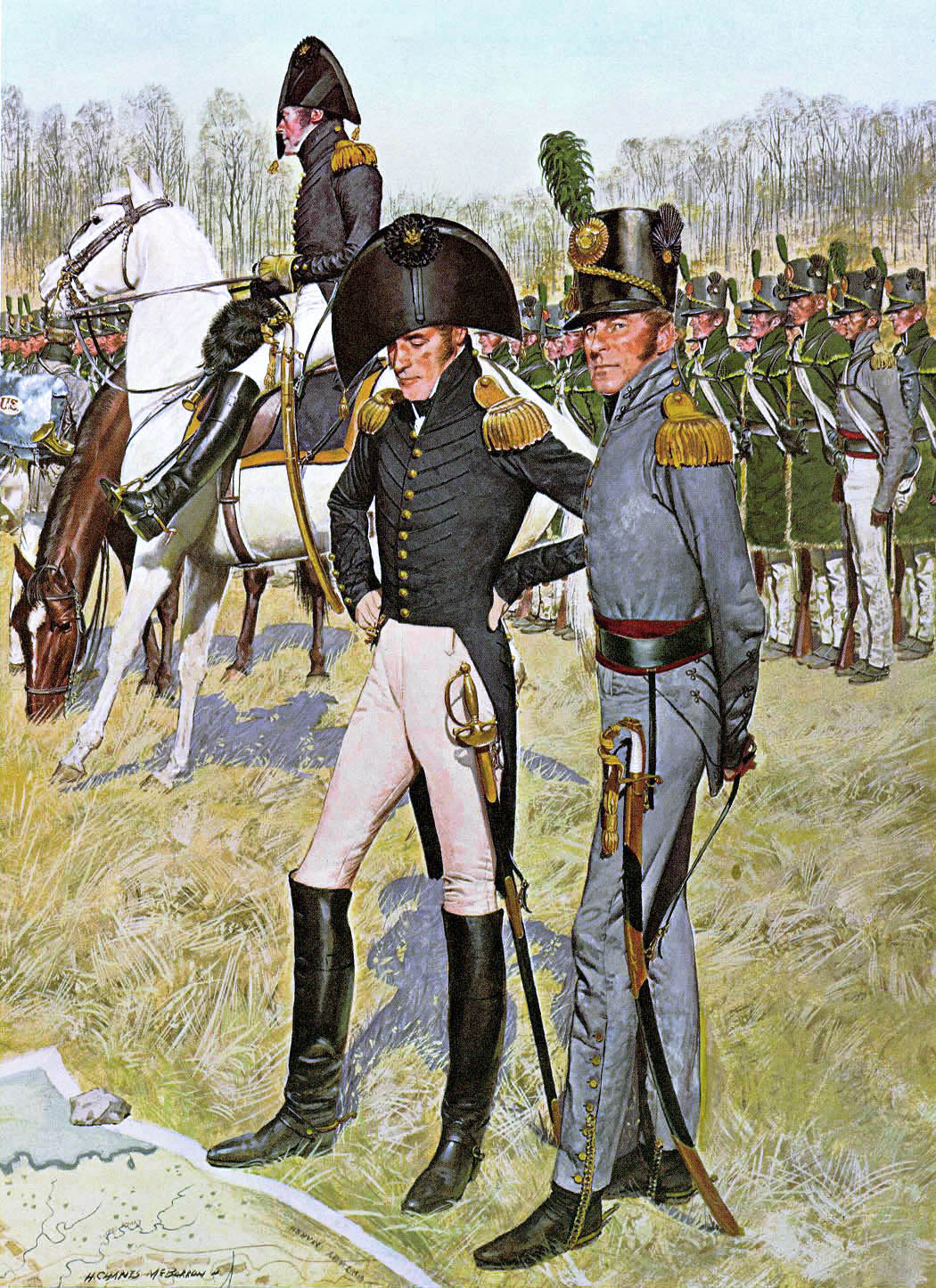
- Riflemen officer in gray (foreground) and troops in green smocks (background)
- Active: 1814 — 1815
- Disbanded: March 3, 1815
- Country: United States
- Branch: United States Army
- Type: Riflemen
- Role: Light infantry
- Size: Regiment
- Weapons: U.S. Model 1814 scalping knife tomahawk,
- Campaigns: War of 1812

Commanders
- Sole Commander: William King

The 3rd Regiment of Riflemen was a unit of the U.S. Army in the early nineteenth century. It was first activated in 1814 during the War of 1812 when the War Department created three additional rifle regiments based on the success of the Regiment of Riflemen. The regiment never fought and was deactivated in May 1815.

== Organization ==
The regiment was activated on February 10, 1814. It was consolidated with the other regiments of riflemen on May 17, 1815.

== Service ==
Regimental depots were placed in Charlotte, North Carolina; Bath Court House, Virginia; and Gallatin, Tennessee.
