= John Overton (judge) =

American judge, banker and political leader

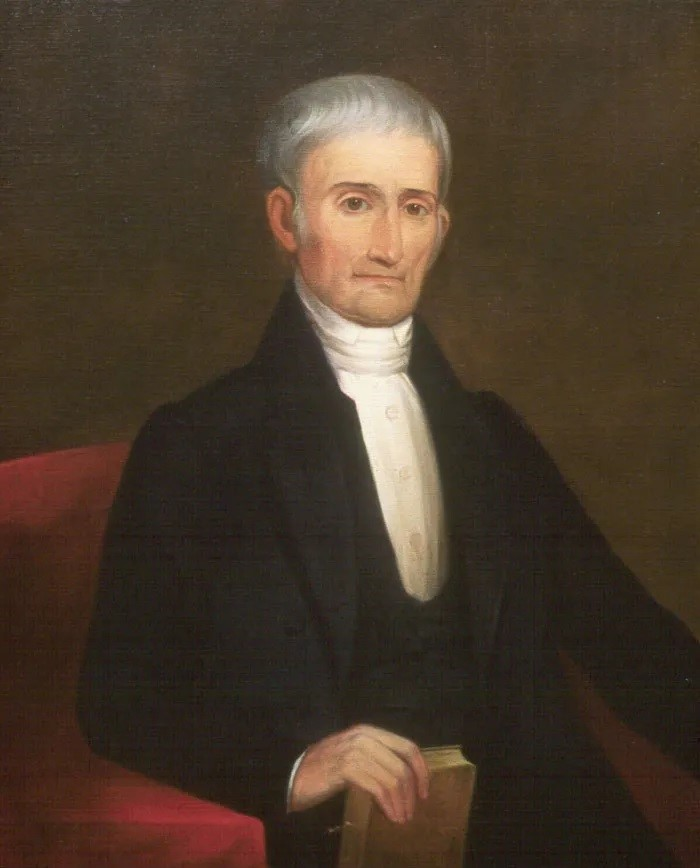

Tennessee Supreme Court Judge
- In office 1804–1810
- Preceded by: Andrew Jackson
- Succeeded by: Robert Whyte

Personal details
- Born: April 9, 1766 Louisa County, Virginia
- Died: April 12, 1833 (aged 67) Nashville, Tennessee
- Spouse: Mary McConnell White
- Relations: Thomas Overton (brother); Richard Arvin Overton (great great grandson)
- Profession: Judge; lawyer; banker; slave trader

John Overton (April 9, 1766 – April 12, 1833) was an American planter and slave trader, a judge at the Tennessee Supreme Court, a banker, political leader, and an advisor of Andrew Jackson. He was described in 1889 as having been the "wealthiest man in the State."

== Early life and career ==
Overton was born on April 9, 1766, in Louisa County, Virginia. His parents were James Overton and Mary Waller. In 1787, he began his law career and moved to Nashville, Tennessee in 1789, to practice law at the Davidson County court. He was elected to succeed his friend Andrew Jackson as a member of the Tennessee Supreme Court in 1804, where he served as a judge until 1810. His elder brother Thomas Overton served as Jackson's second in his duel with Charles Dickinson. In 1819, he founded Memphis, Tennessee on land he owned with Andrew Jackson and James Winchester.

He was elected a member of the American Antiquarian Society in 1820.

Overton engaged in the slave trade and became one of the wealthiest men in Tennessee. Historian Chase C. Mooney, in his 1957 Slavery in Tennessee, came to the conclusion that John Overton, Jackson's business associate and political patron, "might be classed as a slave trader—but not of the coffle-driving type—for he both purchased and sold quite a number of Negroes. Some of his purchases follow: Robin and Pol, $530; Sam, Phyllis, and Ezekiel, $1050; Mathew and wife (slaves of John Coffee, purchased through the United States marshal), $710; Charles, $180 in 'horse flesh, and one hundred and ten dollars in notes'; Lewis, $400; Betty, $800; Elijah, $450; Wood, $600; Bob, $500; Huldy, $375; Tom, $300; Ben, $385; Arthur, $315; Washington, $340; Adam, $500; Martin and Oliver, $365; and 'two negroes,' $700.28." In 1830 a farmer and slave owner named Eleazer Hardeman repudiated his son Seth Hardeman's purchase of a slave named Elbert from Overton, writing that he was "determined never to...encourage any man in the slave trade." Whether this was a moral stance or a negotiating tactic is unclear since Elbert "was considered a poor investment owing to his chronic rheumatism." Emily Berry was sold by Overton in Memphis. Her children Mary, Martha, Billy and Minerva were looking for her years later.

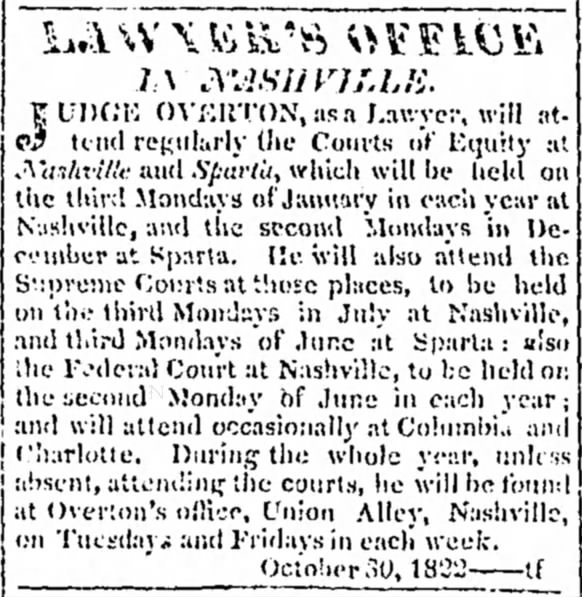
Overton advertised his services as a lawyer in the Nashville Republican Banner in 1822

== Personal life ==
He was married to Mary McConnell White, the daughter of Knoxville founder, James White. He built Greenlevel in Collierville, Tennessee, although he continued to live at Travellers Rest in Nashville.

He died April 12, 1833, at Travellers Rest, his Nashville home.

== Legacy ==
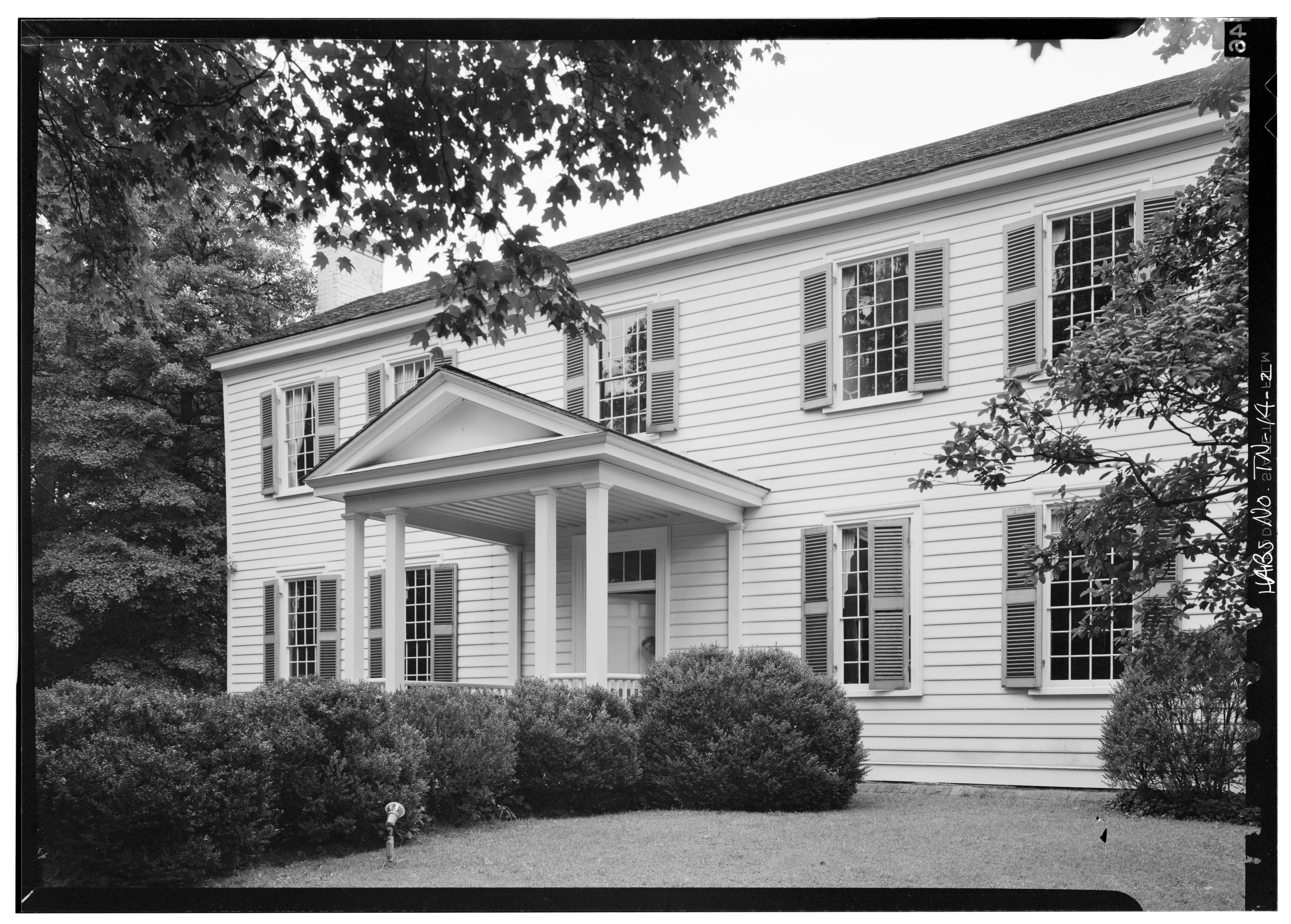
Travelers Rest, his plantation home in Nashville

The nearby John Overton Comprehensive High School, located just across the railroad tracks that abut the property, is named in his honor.

Overton Park in midtown of Memphis was named after John Overton.

The Overton Lodge of Free and Accepted Masons on the historic courthouse square in Rogersville, Tennessee was named after John Overton and is the oldest continuously operating Masonic lodge in the state of Tennessee, and has been operating from the same building since circa 1840, and is a contributing property to the Rogersville Historic District.

Living direct descendants include the Overton family in Nashville, who live very close to Travelers Rest. Perkins Baxter Overton grew up playing on the Travelers Rest grounds and is the great-great-great-grandson of Judge John. His son Thomas Perkins Overton also has a son named John Overton. Another Overton descendent is geologist William R. Dickinson.
