= John Overton (priest) =

English clergyman

John Overton (1763–1838) was an English clergyman, known for his defence of evangelicals at the start of the 19th century.

== Life ==
Overton was born at Monk Fryston in Yorkshire, where his father was a small landed proprietor. He attended the village school there, and went to Magdalene College, Cambridge, graduating B.A. in 1790. Magdalene was then beginning to be an evangelical stronghold; he took an ordinary degree.

Having received holy orders, Overton became assistant curate to William Richardson of York, a leading evangelical. He remained with Richardson until 1802, when he was appointed, through the influence of William Wilberforce, to the chancellor's livings of St. Crux and St. Margaret's in the city of York.

In politics Overton was a Tory and admirer of Pitt the younger. He took an active part in promoting the election of Wilberforce to parliament. He died at York on 17 July 1838, and was buried in the chancel of St. Crux, in a vault with his wife.

== Works ==
Overton is best known as the author of The True Churchmen Ascertained (1801). This work was a reply to The Anti-Calvinist (1800) of Robert Fellowes. The evangelicals, Overton contended,

"are the true churchmen; and, in a very fundamental and important sense of the word, Mr. Daubeny and his associates are dissenters from the Church of England."

In 1802 Edward Pearson at Cambridge, published Remarks on the Doctrine of Justification by Faith in a Letter to J. Overton, followed in the same year by Remarks in a Second Letter. Charles Daubeny defended his position in Vindiciæ Ecclesiæ Anglicanæ (1803), largely concerned with The True Churchmen. A negative review of Overton's book appeared in the Christian Observer, ’ an evangelical periodical edited by Zachary Macaulay; Overton replied in Four Letters to the Editor of the "Christian Observer". The book was, however, welcomed by other evangelicals in correspondence: Richard Cecil, Thomas Dykes, William Hey, Professor Parish, and Charles Simeon.

Overton published patriotic sermons: one in 1803 after the end of the Peace of Amiens that was praised in the British Critic; and another in 1814.

== Family ==
In 1792 Overton married Elizabeth Stodart (died 1827) of Reeth, near Hawes, in the Yorkshire dales, whose father was agent to the lairds of Arkendale. They had a family of twelve children: eight sons and four daughters. The sons all grew up to manhood, and were six feet and upwards in height. Four of them—John, William, Thomas, and Charles—took holy orders; two were lawyers, and two were doctors. John, the eldest (B.A. 1820 and M.A. 1823, Trinity College, Cambridge), won the Seatonian prize at Cambridge, and was rector of Sessay.

== Notes ==
Attribution

This article incorporates text from a publication now in the public domain: Lee, Sidney, ed. (1895). "Overton, John (1763-1838)". Dictionary of National Biography. Vol. 42. London: Smith, Elder & Co.
