= Charles Overton =

English cleric and writer

- Born: 1805; York, United Kingdom
- Died: 1889 (aged 83–84)
- Resting place: Cottingham, United Kingdom
- Occupation(s): Clergyman, writer
- Spouse: Amelia Charlesworth (m. 1829–1885)
- Parent: John Overton (father)
- Relatives: 5 brothers

Charles Overton (1805–1889) was a British cleric and writer.

== Early life and education ==
Overton was born in York, the sixth son of John Overton (1763–1838), rector of St. Margaret's and St. Crux. He was brought up to be a civil engineer, and was not sent to university; but in 1829 he was ordained deacon by Edward Venables-Vernon-Harcourt, the Archbishop of York. He was for a short time assistant curate of Christ Church, Harrogate, but in the year of his ordination moved to Romaldkirk near Barnard Castle.

== Career ==
Overton received priest's orders in 1830 from John Bird Sumner, Bishop of Chester, who in 1837 was presented him to the vicarage of Clapham, then in West Riding of Yorkshire. In 1841 Sumner presented him to the vicarage of Cottingham, near Hull, where he spent the remainder of his life. He was an evangelical and active parish priest in a scattered parish, which then included Skidby and Newland. The parish church of Cottingham was restored, a parsonage and schools were built, and the income increased, while schools and vicarage houses were built at Skidby and Newland.

=== Works ===
Overton wrote both in prose and verse. The most popular of his works was Cottage Lectures on Bunyan's "Pilgrim's Progress" practically explained (1847 first part, 1849 second part), well received by UK and US evangelicals. A poem Ecclesia Anglicana (London, n.d.) was written at Romaldkirk to celebrate the restoration of York Minster after its partial destruction by the arsonist Jonathan Martin; a later edition appeared in 1853. It was good-humouredly satirised by Thomas Moore in a parody.

Other works were:

- Cottage Lectures on the Lord's Prayer practically explained; delivered in the Parish Church of Cottingham (1848).
- The Expository Preacher; or St. Matthew's Gospel practically expounded in Cottingham Church (1850, 2 vols.).
- A Voice from Yorkshire: a Scene at Goodmanham, in the East Riding, A.D. 627, with Notes (1850), about Godmundingham.
- The History of Cottingham (1860).
- The Life of Joseph, in twenty-three Expository Lectures (1866).

== Later life and death ==
Overton died on 31 March 1889, and was buried at Cottingham.

== Personal life ==
In 1829 Overton married Amelia Charlesworth; she died in 1885. By her he had a family of four sons and three daughters.

== Notes ==
Attribution

This article incorporates text from a publication now in the public domain: Lee, Sidney, ed. (1895). "Overton, Charles". Dictionary of National Biography. Vol. 42. London: Smith, Elder & Co.
