= National Register of Historic Places listings in Assumption Parish, Louisiana =

Location of Assumption Parish in Louisiana

Assumption Parish, Louisiana, United States, has nine properties listed on the National Register of Historic Places. The locations of National Register properties for which the latitude and longitude coordinates are included below, may be seen in a map.

This National Park Service list is complete through NPS recent listings posted December 12, 2025.

== Current listings ==
	Name on the Register	Image	Date listed	Location	City or town	Description
1	Assumption Parish Courthouse and Jail	Assumption Parish Courthouse and Jail	February 14, 1997 (#97000057)	4809 Louisiana Highway 1; 29°56′29″N 91°01′28″W	Napoleonville	
2	Belle Alliance	Belle Alliance	November 23, 1998 (#98001425)	Along Louisiana Highway 308, about 0.62 miles (1.00 km) northeast of Belle Rose, Louisiana; 30°03′20″N 91°02′00″W	Belle Alliance	
3	Christ Episcopal Church and Cemetery	Christ Episcopal Church and Cemetery	May 2, 1977 (#77000666)	Corner of Louisiana Highway 1 and Louisiana Highway 1008; 29°56′31″N 91°01′34″W	Napoleonville	
4	Church of the Assumption of the Blessed Virgin Mary	Church of the Assumption of the Blessed Virgin Mary	May 8, 1979 (#79001051)	At end of Bridge Street, off Louisiana Highway 308; 29°59′26″N 91°01′25″W	Plattenville	
5	LaBarre House	LaBarre House	October 31, 2008 (#08001019)	4371 Louisiana Highway 1, about 1.7 miles (2.7 km) southeast of Napoleonville; 29°55′36″N 91°00′00″W	Napoleonville	
6	Madewood	Madewood	October 30, 1973 (#73000860)	On Madewood Road, about 2 miles (3.2 km) southeast of Napoleonville; 29°55′37″N 90°59′40″W	Napoleonville	
7	St. Anne Catholic Church	St. Anne Catholic Church	May 10, 2001 (#01000492)	417 St. Joseph Street; 29°56′16″N 91°01′36″W	Napoleonville	
8	St. Elizabeth Catholic Church	St. Elizabeth Catholic Church	March 24, 1983 (#83000486)	114 Louisiana Highway 403; 29°59′30″N 91°03′20″W	Paincourtville	
9	St. Philomene Catholic Church and Rectory	St. Philomene Catholic Church and Rectory	September 27, 1983 (#83000487)	Corner of Louisiana Highway 1 and Brule Street; 29°50′21″N 90°57′19″W	Labadieville	

== See also ==
- List of National Historic Landmarks in Louisiana
- National Register of Historic Places listings in Louisiana
