= Belle Alliance (disambiguation) =

La Belle Alliance is an inn in Belgium and a notable site during the Battle of Waterloo.

Belle Alliance may also refer to:

- La Belle Alliance Commonwealth War Graves Commission Cemetery, near Ypres, Belgium
- Belle-Alliance-Platz, a previous name for Mehringplatz, a plaza in Berlin, Germany
- Belle Alliance Plantation, Assumption Parish, Louisiana, United States
- Belle Alliance, Louisiana, an unincorporated community in Assumption Parish, Louisiana, United States
- Belle Alliance, a 1980 album by the group Ashra
- Belle Alliance (grape), another name for Italian wine and table grape Luglienga
- Belle Alliance (ship), several ships

== See also ==
- Battle of Waterloo
