= Christ Episcopal Church and Cemetery (Napoleonville, Louisiana) =

Historic church in Louisiana, United States

- U.S. National Register of Historic Places
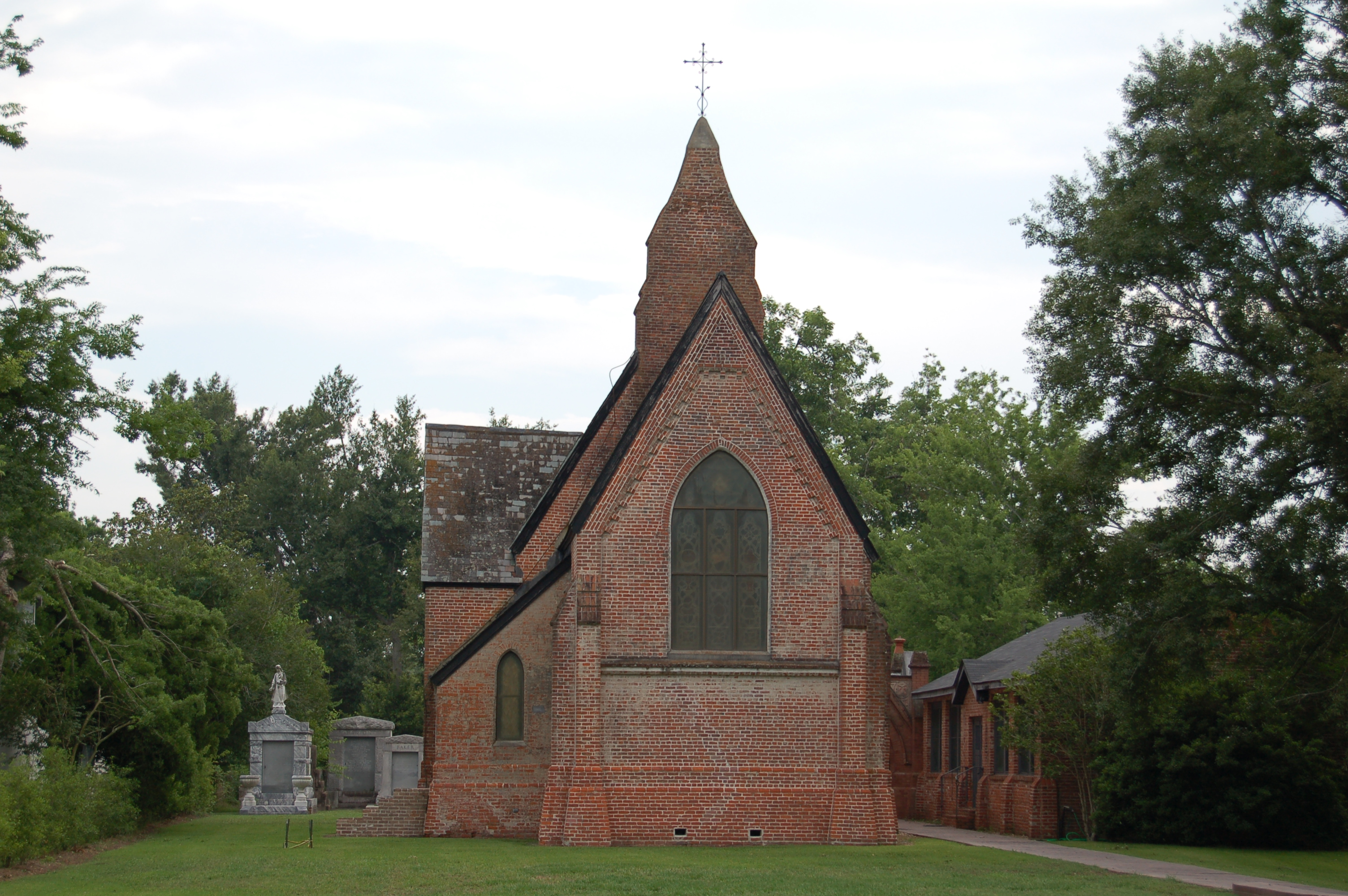

- Location within Louisiana Location within the United States
- Location: Corner of Louisiana Highway 1 and Louisiana Highway 1008, Napoleonville, Louisiana
- Coordinates: 29°56′31″N 91°01′34″W
- Area: 1 acre (0.40 ha)
- Built: 1853
- Built by: George Ament
- Architect: Frank Wills
- Architectural style: Gothic Revival
- NRHP reference No.: 77000666
- Added to NRHP: May 2, 1977

Christ Episcopal Church and Cemetery is a historic Episcopal church on Louisiana Highway 1 between Courthouse Street and Louisiana Highway 1008 in Napoleonville, Louisiana. It was designed by New York City architect Frank Wills in a Gothic Revival style as if it were an English village church, but with adaptations for Louisiana materials. It was built in 1853 and was added to the National Register of Historic Places in 1977.

It is located on the west bank of Bayou Lafourche on land donated by Dr. E. E. Kittredge for the church, on the corner of the former Elm Hall Plantation.

== See also ==
- National Register of Historic Places listings in Assumption Parish, Louisiana
