= Labarre =

Labarre or LaBarre is a surname. Notable people with the surname include:

- Carole Labarre (born 1966), Innu writer from Pessamit, Quebec, Canada
- David Labarre (born 1988), French politician, entrepreneur and former football 5-a-side player
- Éloi Labarre (1764–1833), French architect
- Marie-Agnès Labarre (born 1945), French politician
- Sheila LaBarre (born 1958), American murderer
- Théodore Labarre (1805–1870), French harpist and composer

== See also ==
- Grès de Labarre, geological formation in France
- LaBarre House, in Assumption Parish, Louisiana
