= Grassy Lake (Louisiana) =

- Location within Louisiana Location within the United States
- Location: St. Martin and Assumption, Parishes, Louisiana, US
- Coordinates: 29°46′40″N 91°06′37″W
- Type: Natural lake
- Basin countries: United States (Watershed HUC 8080101)
- Surface area: 414 ha (1,024 acres)
- Average depth: 1.8 m (6 ft)
- Max. depth: 2.7 m (9 ft)
- Shore length^{1}: 12.400 km (7.705 mi)
- Surface elevation: 0 m (0 ft)
- Settlements: Morgan City
- ^{1} Shore length is not a well-defined measure.

Grassy Lake is 1,024 acres (414 ha), a natural lake, and is located in St. Martin and Assumption, Parishes, Louisiana. The 246,000 acres (1,000 km^{2}) of watershed includes Lake Verret, Lake Palourde, all draining into the Atchafalaya River, and finally the Gulf of Mexico. Grassy Lake is almost entirely in St. Martin Parish but Assumption Parish runs along the east side, just west of the shoreline.

== History ==
At the turn of the century, late eighteenth to early twentieth, transportation to market of the crops, especially sugar cane, of the big plantation owners was a challenge. When water levels were high boats could travel on the bayous, lakes, canals, and rivers. Movement on some waterways would require assistance from teams of oxen. Levees would have a cordelle road built so the teams could pull the boats. One way of transporting goods was by the approximately ten miles Attakapas Canal connecting Bayou Lafourche at Napoleonville to Lake Verret. Access to the Atchafalya could then be from Lake Verret, Fourmile Bayou, Grassy Lake, through Simon or Persimmon passes, and Lake Palourde.

== Operation Dry Water ==
A program started in 2009 between the Louisiana Department of Wildlife and Fisheries (LDWF), National Association of State Boating Law Administrators (NASBLA), and the U.S. Coast Guard, as part of a national campaign, resulted in DUI boating charges (also called BWI) in 2017 on five Louisiana waterways including Grassy Lake.

== Vegetation ==
The LDWF conducted a survey for the presence of aquatic vegetation on October 11, 2005, and again on September 21, 2006. The water was considered fairly clear with no submerged aquatic vegetation. Occurrence of invasive species common salvinia, common water hyacinth, water lettuce, alligator weed, water-primrose, Duck Potato (arrowhead), as well as cutgrass that has benefits but can become a nuisance.
