= Assumption High School (Louisiana) =

Public secondary school in Louisiana

Location
- 4880 Hwy 308; Napoleonville, Louisiana 70390; United States; 29.9462°N 91.0272°W

Information
- School type: Public
- Opened: 1948
- School district: Assumption Parish School Board
- Principal: Corey Crochet
- Teaching staff: 49.81 (FTE)
- Grades: 9–12
- Enrollment: 833 (2023–2024)
- Student to teacher ratio: 16.72
- Colors: Red and black
- Mascot: Mustang
- Nickname: Mustangs
- Newspaper: Le Śtang & The Stampede
- Yearbook: The Round Up
- Website: www.assumptionhighschool.com

Assumption High School (AHS) is a public secondary school located at 4880 Highway 308 in Assumption Parish, Louisiana, United States, north of the city of Napoleonville. It is a part of the Assumption Parish School Board.

The sole high school in Assumption Parish, it takes students from all parts of the parish, including Napoleonville, Labadieville, Pierre Part, Bayou L'Ourse, and Belle Rose.

== Academics ==
Assumption High School is a comprehensive public senior high school. The school offers an honors program, an Advanced Placement (AP) program, and a dual enrollment program. Dual enrollment classes are offered to eligible juniors and seniors through L. E. Fletcher Technical Community College. The available AP courses are as follows: human geography, calculus, civics, and biology II. The school offers dual enrollment programs for English language and composition (English III), English literature and composition (English III), U.S. history, world history, and psychology.

== Freshman Academy ==
In 2012, Assumption High School opened a freshman academy, which serves all freshman and houses the majority of freshman classes.

== Clubs and organizations ==
- The Pride of Sugarland Marching Band
- Booster Club
- Class officers (senior, junior, sophomore, freshman)
- Computer Club
- Cooperative Office Education (COE)
- Library Club
- Fellowship of Christian Athletes (FCA)
- French Club
- Future Farmers of America (FFA)
- Jobs for Louisiana Graduates (JAG)
- Mu Alpha Theta (Math Club)
- National Honor Society (NHS)
- NJROTC (Naval Junior Reserve Officer Training Corps)
- Quiz Bowl
- Relay For Life
- Science Club
- Student Council
- 4-H
- HOSA (Future Health Professionals)

== Student media ==
Le Stang & The Stampede serves as the school's newspaper. The school's official yearbook is The Roundup.

== Mascot ==
The Assumption High School mascot is the mustang. Assumption High has named its mascot "Sally" in keeping with the song "Mustang Sally".

== Athletics ==
Assumption High athletics competes in the LHSAA.

Sports sponsored by the school include:

- American football
- Baseball
- Basketball
- Cross country
- Dance Team
- Fishing
- Golf
- Gymnastics
- Softball
- Tennis
- Track and field
- Volleyball

In 2026, Assumption High School was involved in a brawl with Carroll High School. Assumption High School was fined $500, is not allowed to play any home games for the 2006 football season (the game will be played at opposing teams home field) and will be required to submit an action plan addressing logistical and administrative procedures for its home contests.

=== Championships ===
Football championships

- (1) State Championship: 1964

Baseball Championships

 (1)Regional Champions 1989

== Notable alumni ==
- Dan Brouillete, former United States Secretary of Energy
- Troy E. Brown, former member of the Louisiana State Senate
- Terrence Cooks, former linebacker in the NFL
- Brandon Jacobs, two-time Super Bowl winner, former running back for the New York Giants
- Johnny Meads, linebacker for Houston Oilers and Washington Redskins
- Charles Melancon, former member of the United States House of Representatives for Louisiana's 3rd congressional district
- Jordan Mills, former offensive tackle in the NFL
- Tramon Williams, Super Bowl XLV champion defensive back for the Green Bay Packers
- Kim Willoughby, 2008 U.S. indoor volleyball Olympian, former University of Hawaiʻi volleyball player, 2003 AVCA NCAA National Player of the Year
