= St. Philomene Catholic Church and Rectory =

Historic church in Louisiana, United States

- U.S. National Register of Historic Places
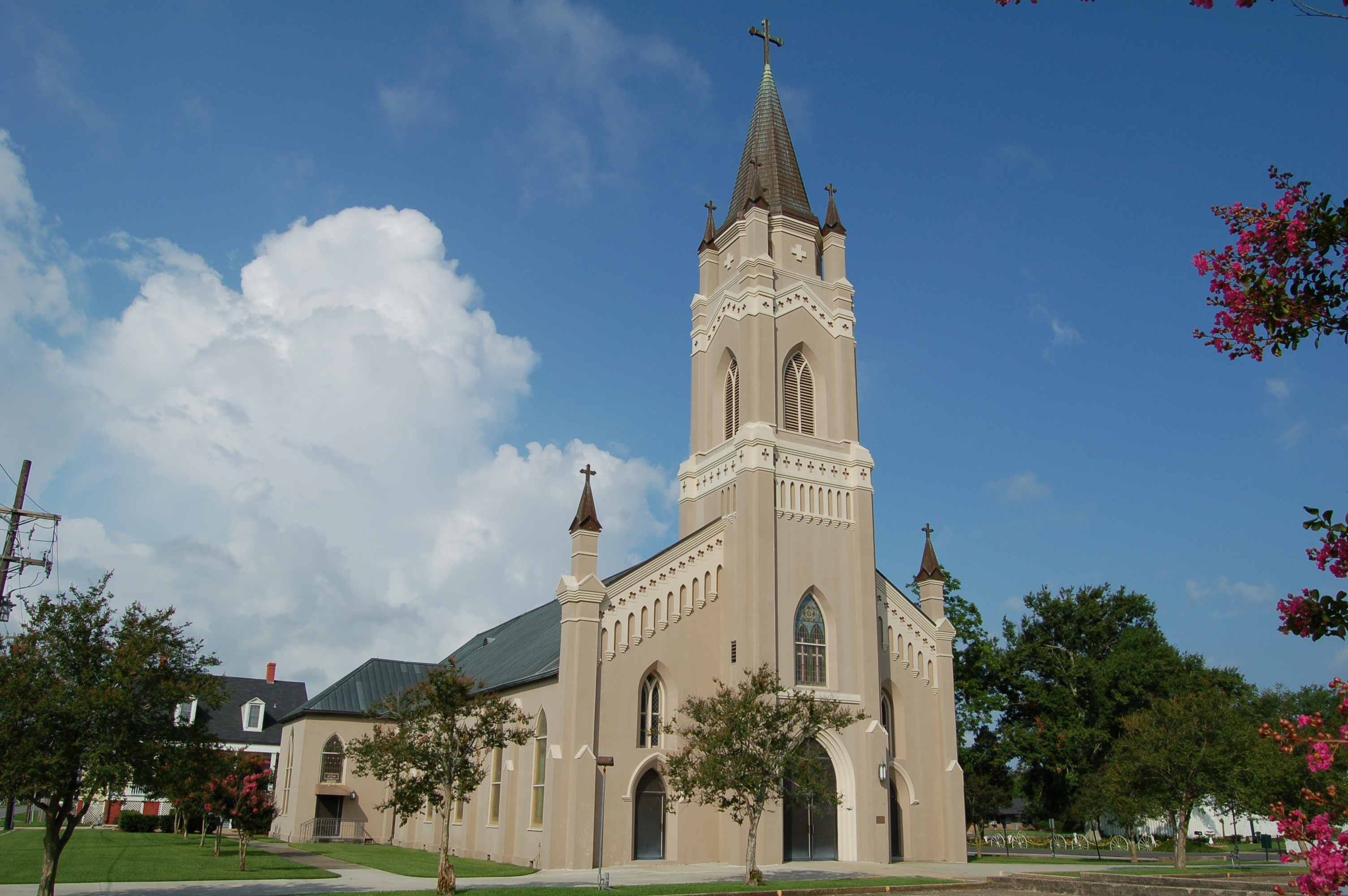
- St. Philomene Catholic Church in Labadieville

- Location within Louisiana
- Location: Corner of Louisiana Highway 1 and Brule Street, Labadieville, Louisiana
- Coordinates: 29°50′21″N 90°57′19″W
- Area: 2 acres (0.81 ha)
- Built: c.1888
- NRHP reference No.: 83000487
- Added to NRHP: September 27, 1983

St. Philomene Catholic Church and Rectory is a historic Roman Catholic church complex located along Louisiana Highway 1 in Labadieville, Assumption Parish, Louisiana. Built in 1888, the church and its rectory were listed on the National Register of Historic Places in 1983 for their architectural and cultural significance.

== History ==
Catholic presence in the Bayou Lafourche area began in the mid-19th century. In 1842, Father Charles Menard, known as the "Apostle of Bayou Lafourche," established a mission in Brule Labadie. A chapel dedicated to Saint Philomena was blessed in 1848, and the parish was formally created in 1855 by Antoine Blanc, Archbishop of New Orleans, with Father Cyprian Vennisat as its first pastor.

Father Vennisat founded the Institute of the Immaculate Conception in 1871, a teaching order of local women that operated the parish school for decades.

The present church was constructed in 1888 to replace earlier structures. Side transepts were added in 1908 under Father A.F. Ravoire. The parish school continued until 2005, marking over a century of Catholic education in Assumption Parish.

== Architecture ==
The church is a five-bay basilica plan structure with a small crossing and a central frontal tower over the narthex. The tower is crowned by an octagonal spire and features angle buttresses, pinnacles, blind lancet arcades, and stylized quatrefoils.

Interior details include false vaulted ceilings with parallel ribs resembling board and batten siding, a nave separated by pillars with foliated capitals and colonnettes, and a second-story gallery with lancet panels. Windows incorporate art glass and opalescent glass.

The rectory, listed as a contributing building, was built contemporaneously with the church and exhibits Greek Revival influences.

== Cultural significance ==
St. Philomene served as a center of Catholic life and education for over 150 years. Its cemetery contains graves of early settlers and a monument to victims of yellow fever epidemics. The parish reflects the resilience of the local Catholic community through Civil War hardships and public health crises.

== National Register of Historic Places ==
The church and rectory were added to the National Register of Historic Places on September 27, 1983, for their architectural and historical importance.

== See also ==
- National Register of Historic Places listings in Assumption Parish, Louisiana
