= Elm Hall Wildlife Management Area =

Protected area of Louisiana, United States

- IUCN category V (protected landscape/seascape)
- Location within Louisiana
- Location: Assumption Parish, Louisiana
- Coordinates: 29°55′43″N 91°7′15″W
- Area: 2,839 acres (11.49 km^{2})
- Established: 1998
- Governing body: Louisiana Department of Wildlife and Fisheries
- Website: www.wlf.louisiana.gov/page/elm-hall

Elm Hall Wildlife Management Area (WMA) is a 2,839-acre (1,149 ha) protected area in Assumption Parish, Louisiana, managed by the Louisiana Department of Wildlife and Fisheries (LDWF). It lies approximately five miles west of Napoleonville, with Lake Verret forming its western boundary and agricultural land to the east. The WMA is part of the Atchafalaya Basin, the largest river swamp in the United States.

== History ==
Elm Hall WMA was acquired by LDWF in 1998 for the purpose of conserving wetland ecosystems and providing regulated public use. The area contains remnants of historical oil and gas development, including a network of canals.

== Geography and habitat ==
The WMA consists primarily of a seasonally flooded cypress–tupelo swamp adjacent to Lake Verret. Elevation increases slightly toward the east, transitioning into bottomland hardwood forest. Vegetation includes cypress, tupelo, buttonbush, alligator weed, smartweed, elephant ear, and duckweed in swamp areas, while higher ridges support species such as cottonwood, sycamore, and oak.

The WMA forms part of the Atchafalaya Basin, which provides flood control, water filtration, and habitat for numerous species. The basin is considered one of North America's most significant wetland systems.

== Access ==
Elm Hall WMA is accessible exclusively by water. Public boat launches providing entry to the area are located at Attakapas Landing at the terminus of Louisiana Highway 401, Pierre Part along Louisiana Highway 70, and at the end of Louisiana Highway 402.

== Recreation ==
Recreational activities permitted within Elm Hall WMA under LDWF regulations include:

- Hunting and trapping during designated seasons for deer, small game, and waterfowl.
- Fishing in Lake Verret and associated canals, where species such as bass, crappie, and catfish occur.
- Camping in designated areas in accordance with LDWF guidelines.
- Bird observation, particularly of bald eagles and migratory species.

== Conservation and management ==
LDWF manages Elm Hall WMA to maintain wetland integrity, regulate public use, and support biodiversity. The area contributes to broader Atchafalaya Basin restoration initiatives aimed at improving hydrology and habitat connectivity.

== Environmental concerns ==
Oilfield canals within the WMA, such as Godchaux and Talbot canals, have altered hydrology and may contribute to wetland degradation.

Groundwater studies near Napoleonville have reported elevated arsenic concentrations, in some cases exceeding U.S. Environmental Protection Agency standards.

== See also ==
- List of Louisiana Wildlife Management Areas
- Atchafalaya Basin
