= Louisiana Highway 1 Bridge =

- Coordinates: 29°13′34″N 90°11′42″W
- Carries: 2 lanes of LA 1
- Crosses: Bayou Lafourche and marsh
- Locale: Lafourche Parish
- Maintained by: LA DOTD

Characteristics
- Total length: 43,600 feet (13,300 m)

History
- Opened: 2009

Statistics
- Toll: Yes

The Louisiana Highway 1 Bridge, also known as the Gateway to the Gulf Expressway, is a concrete trestle toll bridge in the U.S. state of Louisiana. With a total length of 43,600 feet (13,300 m; 8.26 mi), it is one of the longest bridges in the world.

The bridge carries Louisiana Highway 1 over Bayou Lafourche and marshes in south Louisiana. It is located in Lafourche Parish, Louisiana. The bridge, which opened in 2009, connects Leeville to Port Fourchon, with a planned future expansion northward to Golden Meadow. The toll rates as of November 2020 are $3.75 for 2-axle vehicles, $5.50 for 3-axle vehicles, $7.50 for 4-axle vehicles, $15.00 for 5-axle vehicles, and $18.00 for 6-axle vehicles.

== See also ==
- Louisiana Highway 1 § Highway 1 elevated toll expressway
- List of bridges in the United States
- List of longest bridges
