= List of shipwrecks in July 1847 =

The list of shipwrecks in July 1847 includes ships sunk, foundered, wrecked, grounded, or otherwise lost during July 1847.

== 1 July ==
List of shipwrecks: 1 July 1847
Ship	State	Description
Jane Palmer	United Kingdom	The ship ran aground on the Haisborough Sands, in the North Sea off the coast of Norfolk. She floated off but consequently sank with the loss of her captain.
Maria	Kingdom of Hanover	The ship sank "at the Osto". Her crew were rescued.
Voyager	United Kingdom	The ship sprang a leak and foundered in the Atlantic Ocean off Cape St. Vincent, Portugal. Her crew were rescued. She was on a voyage from Agrigento, Sicily to Newcastle upon Tyne, Northumberland.

== 2 July ==
List of shipwrecks: 2 July 1847
Ship	State	Description
Dædalus	United Kingdom	The ship was driven ashore in the Magdalen Islands, Nova Scotia, British North America. She was on a voyage from Quebec City, Province of Canada, British North America to Padstow, Cornwall. She was refloated.
Margaret Parker	United Kingdom	The ship was wrecked on the Fish Potts, off the coast of Tobago. She was on a voyage from London to Scarborough, Tobago.

== 3 July ==
List of shipwrecks: 3 July 1847
Ship	State	Description
Alfred	United Kingdom	The whaler was lost in the Davis Strait. Her crew survived, some were rescued by the brig Peru (Denmark).
Bon Accord	United Kingdom	The whaler was lost in the Davis Strait. Her crew survived, some were rescued by Peru (Denmark).
Twende Sostre	Prussia	The ship ran aground and sank at Thornham, Norfolk, United Kingdom. Her crew were rescued. She was on a voyage from Königsberg to King's Lynn, Norfolk.
White Oak	United States	The ship was driven ashore on Goree, Zeeland, Netherlands. She was on a voyage from Rotterdam, South Holland, Netherlands to New York. She was refloated on 6 July and towed in to Hellevoetsluis, Zeeland.

== 4 July ==
List of shipwrecks: 4 July 1847
Ship	State	Description
Active	United Kingdom	The ship ran aground on the Cork Sand, in the North Sea off the coast of Suffolk. She was on a voyage from Harwich, Essex to Liverpool, Lancashire. She was refloated and taken in to Harwich in a leaky condition.
Arthur	United Kingdom	The ship ran aground off "Clavels", Dorset. She was on a voyage from Plymouth, Devon to Boston, Lincolnshire. She was refloated and resumed her voyage.
Athlone	United Kingdom	The steamship was stranded in fog on Mew Island, near Donaghadee, County Down. All on board were rescued. She was on a voyage from Dublin to Belfast, County Antrim. She was refloated and taken in to Belfast, where she arrived the next day.
Enterprise	(United Kingdom of Great Britain and Ireland) New South Wales	The schooner was wrecked in the Richmond River.
Sea King	United Kingdom	The paddle steamer was stranded in fog on Mew Island. All passengers and crew saved. She was on a voyage from Liverpool, Lancashire to Belfast. She capsized and was wrecked.

== 5 July ==
List of shipwrecks: 5 July 1847
Ship	State	Description
Industry	United Kingdom	The ship struck a sunken rock and was beached at Baltimore, County Cork. She was on a voyage from Limerick to Liverpool, Lancashire. She was repaired and refloated.
Napoleon II	France	The ship put into St. Ives, Cornwall, United Kingdom in a sinking condition.

== 6 July ==
List of shipwrecks: 6 July 1847
Ship	State	Description
Belle Alliance	United Kingdom	The ship ran aground at Adelaide, South Australia. She was on a voyage from London to Adelaide.
Ellida	Grand Duchy of Mecklenburg-Schwerin	The ship was driven ashore near Kronstadt, Russia. She was refloated the next day and put back to Saint Petersburg in a leaky condition.

== 7 July ==
List of shipwrecks: 7 July 1847
Ship	State	Description
Frances Burn	United Kingdom	The ship struck a sunken rock in the Woosung River and was severely damaged. She was on a voyage from Liverpool, Lancashire to Shanghai, China.
Prueba	Spain	The brig was destroyed by fire at Barcelona.

== 8 July ==
List of shipwrecks: 8 July 1847
Ship	State	Description
Cobre	Chile	The ship caught fire whilst on a voyage from Swansea, Glamorgan, United Kingdom to Coquimbo. She put in to Rio de Janeiro, Brazil where she was scuttled.
Racehorse	United Kingdom	The ship ran aground off St. James's Castle, Smyrna, Ottoman Empire. She was refloated the next day and resumed her voyage.
Thomas Snooks	United Kingdom	The ship was driven ashore at Seraglio Point, in the Dardanelles. She was on a voyage from London to Constantinople, Ottoman Empire.
Triumph	United Kingdom	The ship was wrecked east of Grand Cay, Abaco Islands. She was on a voyage from Barbados to an Irish port.

== 9 July ==
List of shipwrecks: 9 July 1847
Ship	State	Description
Donna Maria	United Kingdom	The ship was wrecked on Mal di Ventre, Kingdom of Sardinia. Her crew were rescued. She was on a voyage from London to Odesa.
Felix Vienna	United Kingdom	The barque was wrecked in the Thousand Islands, Netherlands East Indies. She was on a voyage from Batavia to China.
Venus	United States	The ship departed from Camposancos, Spain for an American port. No further trace, presumed foundered in the Atlantic Ocean with the loss of all hands.

== 10 July ==
List of shipwrecks: 10 July 1847
Ship	State	Description
Guave	United Kingdom	The ship struck the Tail Rock, off Grenada and was wrecked.
Symmetry	United Kingdom	The ship was driven ashore at Whitby, Yorkshire. She was refloated on 16 July and towed in to Stockton-on-Tees, County Durham.
Ville de Rouen	France	The ship was wrecked on the Bank of Cacheo. Her crew were rescued. She was on a voyage from Rouen, Seine-Inférieure to the Mellacorée River.

== 11 July ==
List of shipwrecks: 11 July 1847
Ship	State	Description
Duke of Cornwall	United Kingdom	The paddle steamer was driven ashore in Gerran's Bay, Cornwall. She was refloated and towed in to Falmouth, Cornwall.
Nueva Yberia	Spain	The ship was wrecked on a reef off Cape Guinchos. She was on a voyage from Liverpool, Lancashire, United Kingdom to Havana, Cuba.
Ugie	Stettin	The ship ran aground on the Westerground, in the Baltic Sea off the coast of Prussia. She was on a voyage from Newcastle upon Tyne, Northumberland, United Kingdom to Stettin. She was refloated the next day and put in to Swinemünde, Prussia.
Vixen	United Kingdom	The ship was wrecked on the Calf of Man, Isle of Man. She was on a voyage from Troon, Ayrshire to Patras, Greece.

== 12 July ==
List of shipwrecks: 14 July 1847
Ship	State	Description
Hendrika	Netherlands	The tjalk ran aground on the Wittsand, in the North Sea. She was on a voyage from Amsterdam, North Holland to Hamburg. She was declared a total loss.

== 13 July ==
List of shipwrecks: 13 July 1847
Ship	State	Description
Governor Yell	United States	The steamship was wrecked at Port Aransas, Texas. She was on a voyage from New Orleans, Louisiana to Brazos Santiago, Texas.
John and Mary	United Kingdom	The ship was wrecked on Anticosti Island, Nova Scotia, British North America. At least five crew survived. She was on a voyage from Quebec City, Province of Canada, British North America to Dundee, Forfarshire.

== 14 July ==
List of shipwrecks: 14 July 1847
Ship	State	Description
Cadiz	(United Kingdom of Great Britain and Ireland) Isle of Man	The ship foundered in the Bristol Channel off the coast of Glamorgan.
Sir Henry Webb	United Kingdom	The brig ran aground off Den Helder, North Holland, Netherlands. She was refloated and resumed her voyage to Groningen, Netherlands.

== 15 July ==
List of shipwrecks: 15 July 1847
Ship	State	Description
La Bellone	France	The lugger struck rocks off the Longships Lighthouse, Cornwall, United Kingdom and sank. Her crew were rescued. She was on a voyage from Brest, Finistère to Swansea, Glamorgan, United Kingdom.
Margaret	United Kingdom	The ship ran aground on The Manacles and was wrecked. Her crew were rescued.
Marie	United Kingdom	The ship was driven ashore south of Landskrona, Sweden. She was on a voyage from Memel, Prussia to Berwick upon Tweed, Northumberland. She was refloated the next day and resumed her voyage.
William Irvine	United Kingdom	The ship foundered off Black Head. Her crew were rescued. She was on a voyage from Falmouth, Cornwall to Neath, Glamorgan.

== 16 July ==
List of shipwrecks: 16 July 1847
Ship	State	Description
Caledonia	United Kingdom	The whaler was lost in ice in the Davis Strait. Her crew were rescued by Chieftain (United Kingdom) and other vessels.
Caledonia	(France) Mauritius	The ship was wrecked between Cape St. Andrė and Mayonna.
Edward Wolfe	United Kingdom	The ship was wrecked off Cuba. At least one crew member survived. She was on a voyage from Newcastle upon Tyne, Northumberland to Cuba.
Emerald Isle	United Kingdom	The ship ran aground and capsized on the Mussel Beel. She was on a voyage from Whitehaven, Cumberland to Drogheda, County Louth.
Flambeau	United Kingdom	The paddle steamer ran aground near Liverpool, Lancashire.
Vixen	(United Kingdom of Great Britain and Ireland) New South Wales	The ship departed from Sydney for Newcastle. No further trace, presumed foundered with the loss of all hands.
Wave	United Kingdom	The ship was driven ashore at Rock Ferry, Cheshire. She was on a voyage from Malta to Liverpool. She was refloated on 18 July.

== 17 July ==
List of shipwrecks: 17 July 1847
Ship	State	Description
Don Juan	Flag unknown	The schooner departed from Hong Kong for Shanghai, China. Presumed subsequently foundered with the loss of all hands, possibly on 20 September.
John	United Kingdom	The ship ran aground on a reef off Storholm. She was on a voyage from South Shields, County Durham to Saint Petersburg, Russia. She was later refloated and resumed her voyage.
Salami	Russia	The full-rigged ship was driven ashore in the Scheldt between Bath, Zeeland, Netherlands and Lille, Antwerp, Belgium. She was on a voyage from Odesa to the city of Antwerp.
Young Dixon	United Kingdom	The ship ran aground on a reef off Gotland, Sweden. She was on a voyage from Saint Petersburg, Russia to Hull, Yorkshire. She was later refloated and resumed her voyage.

== 18 July ==
List of shipwrecks: 18 July 1847
Ship	State	Description
Maripost	United Kingdom	The ship ran aground on the Goodwin Sands, Kent. She was refloated and taken in to The Downs.

== 19 July ==
List of shipwrecks: 19 July 1847
Ship	State	Description
Saracen	United States	The ship was driven ashore on Rathlin Island, County Donegal, United Kingdom. She was on a voyage from New York to Liverpool, Lancashire, United Kingdom.

== 19 July ==
List of shipwrecks: 19 July 1847
Ship	State	Description
Pilot	United Kingdom	The ship departed from Mozambique for the Cape of Good Hope, Cape Colony. No further trace, presumed foundered with the loss of all hands.

== 20 July ==
List of shipwrecks: 20 July 1847
Ship	State	Description
Loch Sloy	United Kingdom	The ship was driven ashore on Seal Island, Nova Scotia, British North America. She was on a voyage from Saint John, New Brunswick, British North America to Dublin. She had been refloated by 18 August and towed in to Yarmouth, Nova Scotia.

== 21 July ==
List of shipwrecks: 21 July 1847
Ship	State	Description
Earl of Selkirk	United Kingdom	The ship was driven ashore and wrecked near Bootle, Lancashire.
Eleanor	United Kingdom	The ship was driven ashore at Caernarfon. She was on a voyage from Caernarfon to Ayr.

== 22 July ==
List of shipwrecks: 22 July 1847
Ship	State	Description
Robert Burns	United Kingdom	The ship was driven ashore at Crosby, Lancashire. She was on a voyage from Liverpool, Lancashire to Odesa.
Swan	United Kingdom	The ship was wrecked on the Blackshaw Bank, off the Southerness Lighthouse, Dumfriesshire. She was on a voyage from Maryport, Cumberland to Dumfries.

== 24 July ==
List of shipwrecks: 25 July 1847
Ship	State	Description
Alpha	(United Kingdom of Great Britain and Ireland) South Australia	The schooner was wrecked in Encounter Bay. Her crew were rescued.

== 25 July ==
List of shipwrecks: 25 July 1847
Ship	State	Description
Mary	United Kingdom	The flat capsized in the Irish Sea with the loss of a crew member. She was on a voyage from Liverpool to Barrow-in-Furness, Lancashire. Mary was subsequently towed in to Liverpool.

== 26 July ==
List of shipwrecks: 26 July 1847
Ship	State	Description
Elizabeth	United Kingdom	The ship ran aground on the Jedore Ledges and was abandoned, She was on a voyage from Halifax, Nova Scotia to Quebec City, Province of Canada, British North America.

== 27 July ==
List of shipwrecks: 27 July 1847
Ship	State	Description
City of Sydney	(United Kingdom of Great Britain and Ireland) New South Wales	The brig was wrecked on the Sow and Pigs Rocks, off Sydney. She was on a voyage from Sydney to Launceston, Van Diemen's Land.
Grace Darling	(United Kingdom of Great Britain and Ireland) British North America	The brigantine was driven ashore and wrecked at Jedore Head. She was on a voyage from Boston, Massachusetts, United States to Chaleur Bay.
Mars	United Kingdom	The ship struck the Cabezas Rocks and was beached near Tarifa, Spain. She was on a voyage from Cork to Galaţi, Ottoman Empire.
Pedlar	(United Kingdom of Great Britain and Ireland) New South Wales	The cutter was wrecked on Bondi Beach. Her crew were rescued. She was on a voyage from Wollongong to Sydney.

== 28 July ==
List of shipwrecks: 28 July 1847
Ship	State	Description
Stalkart	United Kingdom	The ship was wrecked on a reef off Saugor, India. She was on a voyage from India to an English port.

== 29 July ==
List of shipwrecks: 29 July 1847
Ship	State	Description
Daniel Walter	United Kingdom	The ship foundered in the North Sea. Her crew were rescued by the steamship Robert Rankin (United Kingdom).
Jeune Carolie	France	The ship was wrecked on the Goodwin Sands, Kent, United Kingdom. Her crew were rescued. She was on a voyage from Middlesbrough, Yorkshire to Libourne, Gironde.

== 30 July ==
List of shipwrecks: 30 July 1847
Ship	State	Description
Janets	United Kingdom	The brig struck a sunken rock off St. Eval Head, Cornwall and was damaged. She was on a voyage from Swansea, Glamorgan to Rotterdam, South Holland, Netherlands. She was assisted in to Padstow, Cornwall by HMRC Childers ( Board of Customs ). Janets was placed under repair.

== 31 July ==
List of shipwrecks: 31 July 1847
Ship	State	Description
Gateway	United Kingdom	The ship was abandoned in Loch Eribol.
Grace Darling	United Kingdom	The barque ran aground at Ballyquinton Point, County Down. She was on a voyage from Dublin to Richibucto, New Brunswick, British North America. She was refloated and put in to Strangford, County Down.
Sea Gull	United Kingdom	The ship ran aground on The Skerries, in the Irish Sea off the coast of County Antrim. She was on a voyage from Belfast, County Antrim to Londonderry. She was refloated and taken in to Portrush, County Down.

== Unknown date ==
List of shipwrecks: unknown date in July 1847
Ship	State	Description
Azieta	United States	The ship caught fire and was abandoned in the Atlantic Ocean on or before 3 July.
Betsey	United Kingdom	The ship ran aground near Tulcea, Ottoman Empire. She was on a voyage from the Danube to Cork or Falmouth, Cornwall. She was later refloated and consequently put in to Constantinople, Ottoman Empire.
Brothers	(United Kingdom of Great Britain and Ireland) New South Wales	The ketch was wrecked at Crowdy Head in late July. Both crew survived. She was on a voyage from Sydney to Twofold Bay.
Clarisse	France	The ship was wrecked on Saint Pierre Island with the loss of 65 lives.
Elizabeth	United Kingdom	The ship was abandoned in the Atlantic Ocean before 20 July.
Flying Fish	(United Kingdom of Great Britain and Ireland) New Zealand	The ship was lost off the east coast on New Zealand before 17 July.
Golden Fleece	(United Kingdom of Great Britain and Ireland) New South Wales	The ship ran aground in the Richmond River.
Inez	Portugal	The ship ran aground and sank at the mouth of the Rio Grande. Her crew were rescued.
Lady Fitzroy	(United Kingdom of Great Britain and Ireland) New Zealand	The craft was swamped on the east coast of North Island before 17 July, with the loss of ten lives. The same storm claimed several smaller craft.
Lucy	United States	The schooner was abandoned in the Atlantic Ocean on or before 5 July.
Maria Ramiette	France	The ship was wrecked on the Longsand, in the North Sea off the coast of Essex, United Kingdom. She was on a voyage from Sunderland, County Durham, United Kingdom to Brest, Finistère.
May Queen	United Kingdom	The ship raround at Tarabya, Ottoman Empire. She was on a voyage from Odesa to Falmouth or Cork. She was refloated with assistance from HMS Hecla (Royal Navy).
Montebello	United States	The ship foundered in the Grand Banks of Newfoundland. Her crew were rescued.
Perseverance	(United Kingdom of Great Britain and Ireland) New Zealand	The schooner was wrecked off the coast of Otago, New ZealandShe dragged her anchor during a storm and was driven on shore.
Rover	United Kingdom	The ship was driven ashore in Placentia Bay. She was on a voyage from Prince Edward Island, British North America to Southampton, Hampshire.
Sir Herbert Maddock	India	The steamship was wrecked in the Hooghly River at Fort Gloucester, 15 nautical miles (28 km) downstream of Calcutta.
Two Brothers	(United Kingdom of Great Britain and Ireland) New Zealand	The ship was lost off the east coast of New Zealand before 17 July.
Vrouw Anna	Hamburg	The ship struck a sunken rock and capsized near "Mühlenberg". She was on a voyage from Hamburg to Stettin.
