= St. Anne Catholic Church (Napoleonville, Louisiana) =

Historic church in Louisiana, United States

- U.S. National Register of Historic Places
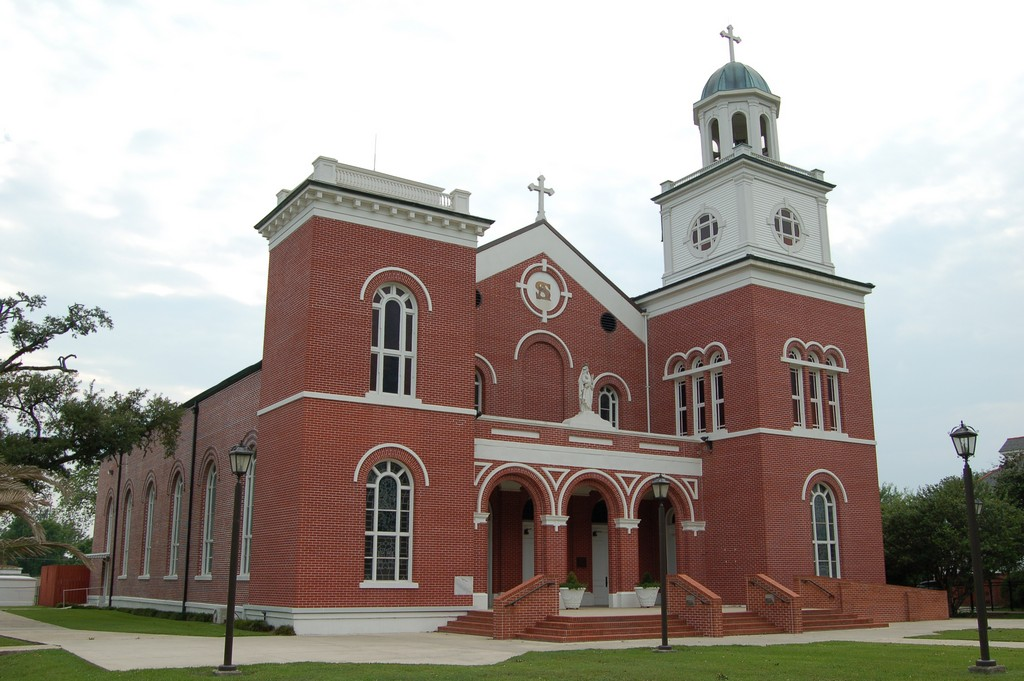

- Location within Louisiana Location within the United States
- Location: 417 St. Joseph Street, Napoleonville, Louisiana
- Coordinates: 29°56′16″N 91°01′36″W
- Area: 4.5 acres (1.8 ha)
- Built: 1909
- Architect: C.C. Stewart
- Architectural style: Romanesque, Colonial Revival
- NRHP reference No.: 01000492
- Added to NRHP: May 10, 2001

The St. Anne Catholic Church in Napoleonville, Louisiana is a historic Roman Catholic church which was built in 1909. It is located about four blocks inland from Bayou Lafourche at 417 St. Joseph Street, as part of a two-block parcel which includes a contributing rectory (1895) and a contributing cemetery (started 1874), as well as three non-contributing buildings. It was added to the National Register in 2001.

It is a one-story basilica plan church reflecting Romanesque influence with a gable front flanked by two towers, one dating to c.1920 and reflecting Colonial Revival architecture. The church has a number of large round arch windows, with those on the nave and chancel topped by brick archivolts "laid in corbelled concentric semicircles to suggest texture". As there are many other elements of styling in the design of the church which achieve a pleasing appearance, it was deemed "an outstanding candidate for National Register listing" in its nomination.

== See also ==
- National Register of Historic Places listings in Assumption Parish, Louisiana
