= Belle Alliance (ship) =

Several ships have been named Belle Alliance or La Belle Alliance for La Belle Alliance:

- Belle Alliance (1815 ship) was the first large (140 tons (bm)) ship built in Guernsey. She was lost in March 1823 on the Goodwin Sands, Kent. Her crew were rescued. She was on a voyage from Antwerp to Guernsey.
- Belle Alliance (1816 ship), of 102 tons (bm), was launched in Prussia. She was wrecked on 2 December 1843.
- Belle Alliance (1817 ship) was launched at Chittagong in 1817. She moved her registry to England. In 1820 she carried settlers to South Africa. She then traded with India initially under a license from the British East India Company, which trade continued after the company's demise. In 1847 she carried emigrants to Adelaide, South Australia. She was last listed in 1854.
