= Labadieville, Louisiana =

- Census-designated place
- Location of Labadieville in Louisiana
- Coordinates: 29°49′57″N 90°57′17″W
- Country: United States
- State: Louisiana
- Parish: Assumption

Area
  - Total: 3.89 sq mi (10.07 km^{2})
  - Land: 3.89 sq mi (10.07 km^{2})
  - Water: 0 sq mi (0.00 km^{2})
- Elevation: 16 ft (4.9 m)

Population (2020)
  - Total: 1,715
  - Density: 440.9/sq mi (170.22/km^{2})
- Time zone: UTC-6 (CST)
  - Summer (DST): UTC-5 (CDT)
- ZIP code: 70372
- Area code: 985
- FIPS code: 22-40420

Labadieville is a census-designated place (CDP) in Assumption Parish, Louisiana, United States. It is located along Bayou Lafourche in the southeastern part of the state, approximately 60 miles (97 km) west of New Orleans and 13 miles (21 km) south of Donaldsonville. According to the 2020 United States census, Labadieville had a population of 1,715. The community is part of the Pierre Part Micropolitan Statistical Area.

== History ==
Labadieville, originally known as Brûlée Labadie, derives its name from Jean Louis Labadie, a French settler and landowner who established himself along Bayou Lafourche in the early 19th century. Labadie was born in France in 1799 and immigrated to Louisiana, where he operated a plantation and store before his death in 1854.

Prior to European settlement, the area was inhabited by Native American tribes, notably the Chitimacha, along with the Washa and Chawasha peoples. The Chitimacha were among the most powerful tribes in southern Louisiana, known for their basket weaving and complex social structure. They occupied territory from the Atchafalaya Basin to the lower Mississippi River drainage. By the early 18th century, conflicts with French colonists led to a twelve-year war, ending in 1718 with a treaty that forced the Chitimacha to relinquish lands near the Mississippi River. Despite this, they maintained a presence near Lake Verret, close to present-day Labadieville, where burial mounds have been documented.

European settlement along Bayou Lafourche began in the mid-18th century. After 1750, the region saw an influx of French and Spanish colonists, joined by Acadians following their deportation from Nova Scotia in 1755. These Acadians established farms along the bayou, contributing to the development of Cajun culture. In the late 18th century, Isleños (Canary Islanders) arrived under Spanish rule, forming communities such as Valenzuela near Donaldsonville. Additionally, a small number of Germans from the German Coast migrated westward into the Lafourche district, further diversifying the population.

Catholicism played a central role in the community's development. In 1842, Father Charles Menard, known as the “Apostle of Bayou Lafourche,” conducted the first mission at Brûlée Labadie. A chapel was constructed in 1847, and the parish of St. Philomena Catholic Church was formally established in 1855. The current church building, completed in 1888, is listed on the National Register of Historic Places. The parish also founded the Institute of the Immaculate Conception in 1871, a teaching order that operated a parochial school for over a century.

Labadieville was the site of the Battle of Georgia Landing (also called the Battle of Labadieville) on October 27, 1862, during the American Civil War. Union forces under Brigadier General Godfrey Weitzel, numbering about 4,000 men, clashed with approximately 1,392 Confederate troops commanded by Brigadier General Alfred Mouton. After intense fighting, Confederate forces retreated due to depleted artillery ammunition, allowing Union troops to occupy the Bayou Lafourche region. Casualties included 86 Union and 229 Confederate soldiers, with over 200 Confederates captured. The victory secured Union control of the Lafourche district and its valuable sugar plantations.

Following the Civil War, Labadieville entered the Reconstruction era under federal occupation. Former plantations adapted to free labor systems, and sugarcane remained the dominant crop. The late 19th century saw rebuilding efforts and improved transportation along Bayou Lafourche, including steamboat traffic and rail connections. In 1905, the Cancienne Canal was constructed to improve drainage and connect Lake Verret to Bayou Lafourche near Napoleonville, transforming agriculture and settlement patterns in Assumption Parish. By the mid-20th century, highway improvements and modernization linked Labadieville more closely to regional trade routes, while historic landmarks such as St. Philomena Church became recognized symbols of the town's heritage. In 2022 Horror House Pictures launched a production company based out of Labadieville. It's the first of Its kind to ever exist in the towns history. The owners are longtime residents Brandon Harrell and his wife Cheyenne Harrell.

== Geography ==
Labadieville is located in Assumption Parish along Bayou Lafourche, approximately 13 miles (21 km) south of Donaldsonville and 60 miles (97 km) west of New Orleans. The community lies within the Mississippi River Delta region of southeastern Louisiana, characterized by low-lying terrain and alluvial soils deposited by the Mississippi River and its distributaries.

Labadieville is situated at 29°49′57″N 90°57′17″W, with an average elevation of 16 feet (4.9 m) above sea level. According to the United States Census Bureau, the census-designated place has a total area of 3.89 square miles (10.1 km^{2}), all land.

The surrounding landscape consists of wetlands, bayou systems, and agricultural fields, primarily devoted to sugarcane cultivation. The region's proximity to Bayou Lafourche provides natural drainage and historically served as a transportation corridor for steamboat traffic and modern roadways, including Louisiana Highway 1.

Labadieville has a humid subtropical climate (Köppen Cfa), with hot, humid summers and mild winters. The area is prone to hurricane activity and flooding due to its low elevation and proximity to coastal waterways, making levee systems and drainage canals critical for flood control.

== Demographics ==
Historical population
Census	Pop.	Note	%±
1980	2,138		—
1990	1,821		−14.8%
2000	1,811		−0.5%
2010	1,854		2.4%
2020	1,715		−7.5%
U.S. Decennial Census; 1950 1960 1970 1980; 1990 2000 2010

Labadieville first appeared as a census designated place the 1980 U.S. Census.

=== 2020 census ===
As of the 2020 census, Labadieville had a population of 1,715. The median age was 42.9 years. 19.4% of residents were under the age of 18 and 19.0% of residents were 65 years of age or older. For every 100 females, there were 88.7 males, and for every 100 females age 18 and over, there were 85.9 males age 18 and over.

64.7% of residents lived in urban areas, while 35.3% lived in rural areas.

There were 700 households in Labadieville, of which 28.6% had children under the age of 18 living in them. Of all households, 51.1% were married-couple households, 17.0% were households with a male householder and no spouse or partner present, and 24.0% were households with a female householder and no spouse or partner present. About 23.5% of all households were made up of individuals and 12.7% had someone living alone who was 65 years of age or older.

There were 766 housing units, of which 8.6% were vacant. The homeowner vacancy rate was 1.8% and the rental vacancy rate was 6.8%.

Racial composition as of the 2020 census
Race	Number	Percent
White	1,273	74.2%
Black or African American	323	18.8%
American Indian and Alaska Native	13	0.8%
Asian	2	0.1%
Native Hawaiian and Other Pacific Islander	0	0.0%
Some other race	24	1.4%
Two or more races	80	4.7%
Hispanic or Latino (of any race)	96	5.6%

=== 2000 census ===
As of the census of 2000, there were 1,811 people, 666 households, and 514 families residing in the CDP. The population density was 466.5 inhabitants per square mile (180.1/km^{2}). There were 709 housing units at an average density of 182.6 per square mile (70.5/km^{2}). The racial makeup of the CDP was 81.12% White, 17.50% African American, 0.28% Native American, 0.17% Asian, 0.17% from other races, and 0.77% from two or more races. Hispanic or Latino of any race were 1.10% of the population.

There were 666 households, out of which 36.9% had children under the age of 18 living with them, 61.7% were married couples living together, 13.1% had a female householder with no husband present, and 22.7% were non-families. 18.8% of all households were made up of individuals, and 9.0% had someone living alone who was 65 years of age or older. The average household size was 2.72 and the average family size was 3.12.

In the CDP, the population was spread out, with 26.5% under the age of 18, 10.3% from 18 to 24, 29.3% from 25 to 44, 22.6% from 45 to 64, and 11.2% who were 65 years of age or older. The median age was 35 years. For every 100 females, there were 92.9 males. For every 100 females age 18 and over, there were 89.9 males.

The median income for a household in the CDP was $35,417, and the median income for a family was $43,438. Males had a median income of $34,904 versus $22,063 for females. The per capita income for the CDP was $14,865. About 12.4% of families and 17.5% of the population were below the poverty line, including 26.4% of those under age 18 and 24.9% of those age 65 or over.

== Notable people ==
- Mary Anne de Boisblanc — self-taught folk artist, born in Labadieville in 1925
- Brandon Scott Harrell - Film producer and owner of Horror House Pictures

== See also ==
- Congregation of the Immaculate Conception
