= Cote Blanche Bridge =

Bridge in Louisiana, United States

- Coordinates: 29°31′N 90°20′W
- Crosses: Bayou Lafourche
- Locale: West 79th Street, Cut Off, Louisiana, United States

Characteristics
- Design: Pontoon bridge
- Material: Steel
- Total length: 191.9 feet (58.5 m)
- Width: 18 feet (5.5 m)
- Longest span: 84 feet (26 m)

History
- Built: 1956; 70 years ago

Location
- Interactive map of Cote Blanche Bridge

The Cote Blanche Bridge crosses Bayou Lafourche at West 79th Street in the town of Cut Off, Louisiana.

Built in 1956, this steel pontoon bridge has a total length of 191.9 feet (58.5 m) with its largest span at 84 feet (26 m). The bridge deck is 18 feet (5.5 m) wide.
