= Assumption Parish School Board =

School district in Louisiana, United States

Coordinates: 29°59′16″N 91°1′11″W

Assumption Parish School Board is a school district headquartered in the unincorporated area of Assumption Parish, Louisiana, United States. The district serves Assumption Parish.

== School uniforms ==
The district requires its students to wear school uniforms.

== Schools ==
Schools are located in unincorporated areas.

=== Secondary schools ===
- Assumption High School- In the 2025-26 school year, the high school expanded to the middle school grades of 7 & 8. It became grade 7-12.

=== Elementary schools ===
- Bayou L'Ourse Elementary School
- Belle Rose Elementary School
- Labadieville Elementary School
- Napoleonville Elementary School
- Pierre Part Elementary School
