= Belle Alliance Plantation =

Historic house in Louisiana, United States

- Belle Alliance
- U.S. National Register of Historic Places
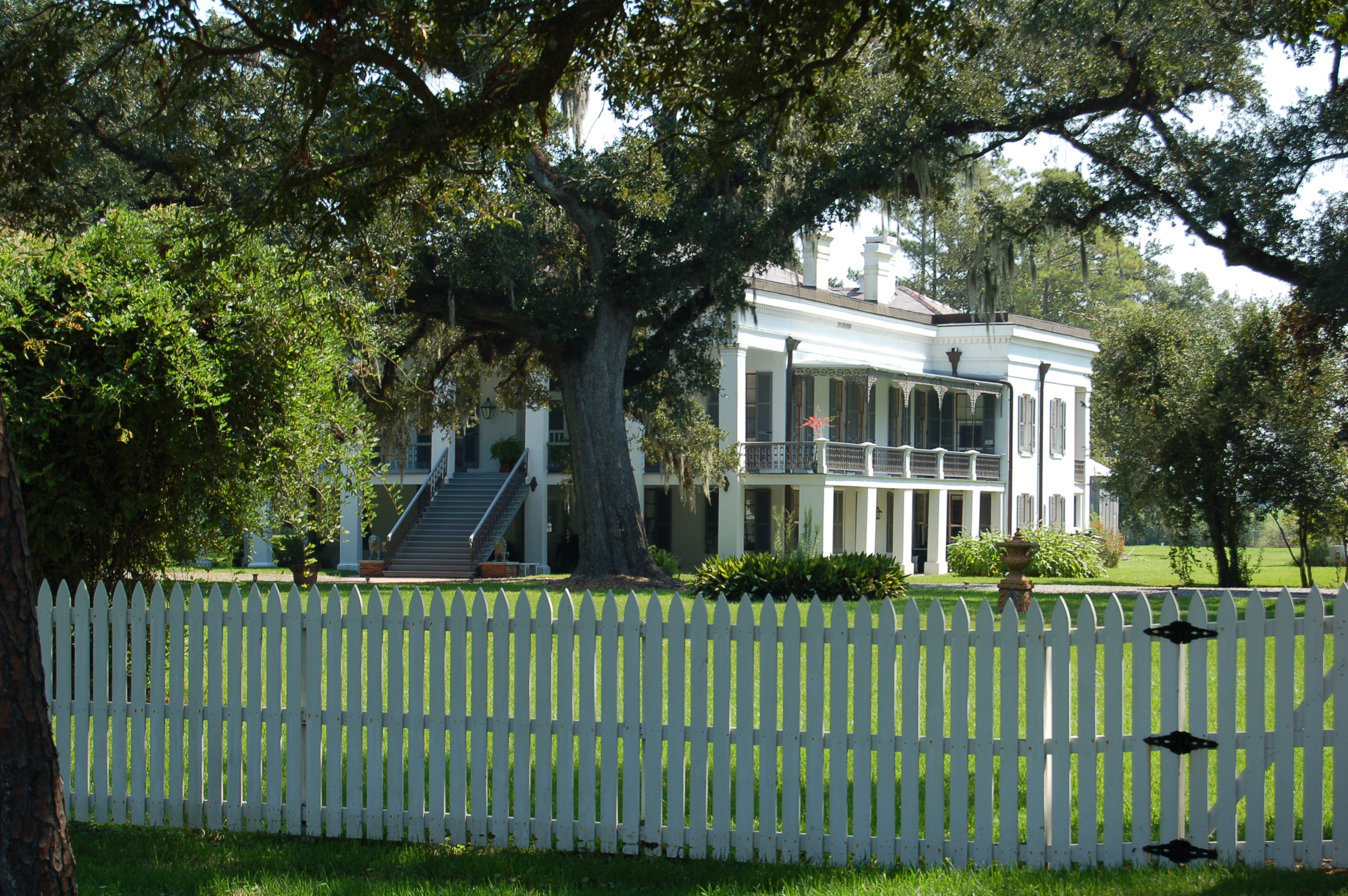

- Location within Louisiana Location within the United States
- Location: Along Louisiana Highway 308, about 0.62 miles (1.00 km) northeast of Belle Rose, Louisiana
- Nearest city: Belle Alliance, Louisiana
- Coordinates: 30°03′20″N 91°02′00″W
- Area: 5.98 acres (2.42 ha)
- Built: 1846
- Architect: Paul Andry
- Architectural style: Italianate, Greek Revival
- NRHP reference No.: 98001425
- Added to NRHP: November 23, 1998

Belle Alliance is an Italianate and Greek Revival plantation house in Assumption Parish, Louisiana, U.S.A. It is the namesake of the unincorporated community of Belle Alliance.

The town and the plantation are located on the east bank of Bayou Lafourche, about 5 miles (8.0 km) southwest of Donaldsonville and about 0.62 miles (1.00 km) northeast of Belle Rose.

During the 1770s, this 7,000-acre (28 km^{2}) plot was granted to Don Juan Vives, a physician and military officer of the Spanish government. The Belle Alliance plantation house was built by Charles Anton Kock, a successful planter who used slave labor to grow sugar and also owned the St. Emma Plantation around 1846.

The plantation house was listed on the National Register of Historic Places in 1998.

== See also ==
- National Register of Historic Places listings in Assumption Parish, Louisiana
