= Church of the Assumption of the Blessed Virgin Mary (Plattenville, Louisiana) =

Historic church in Louisiana, United States

- U.S. National Register of Historic Places
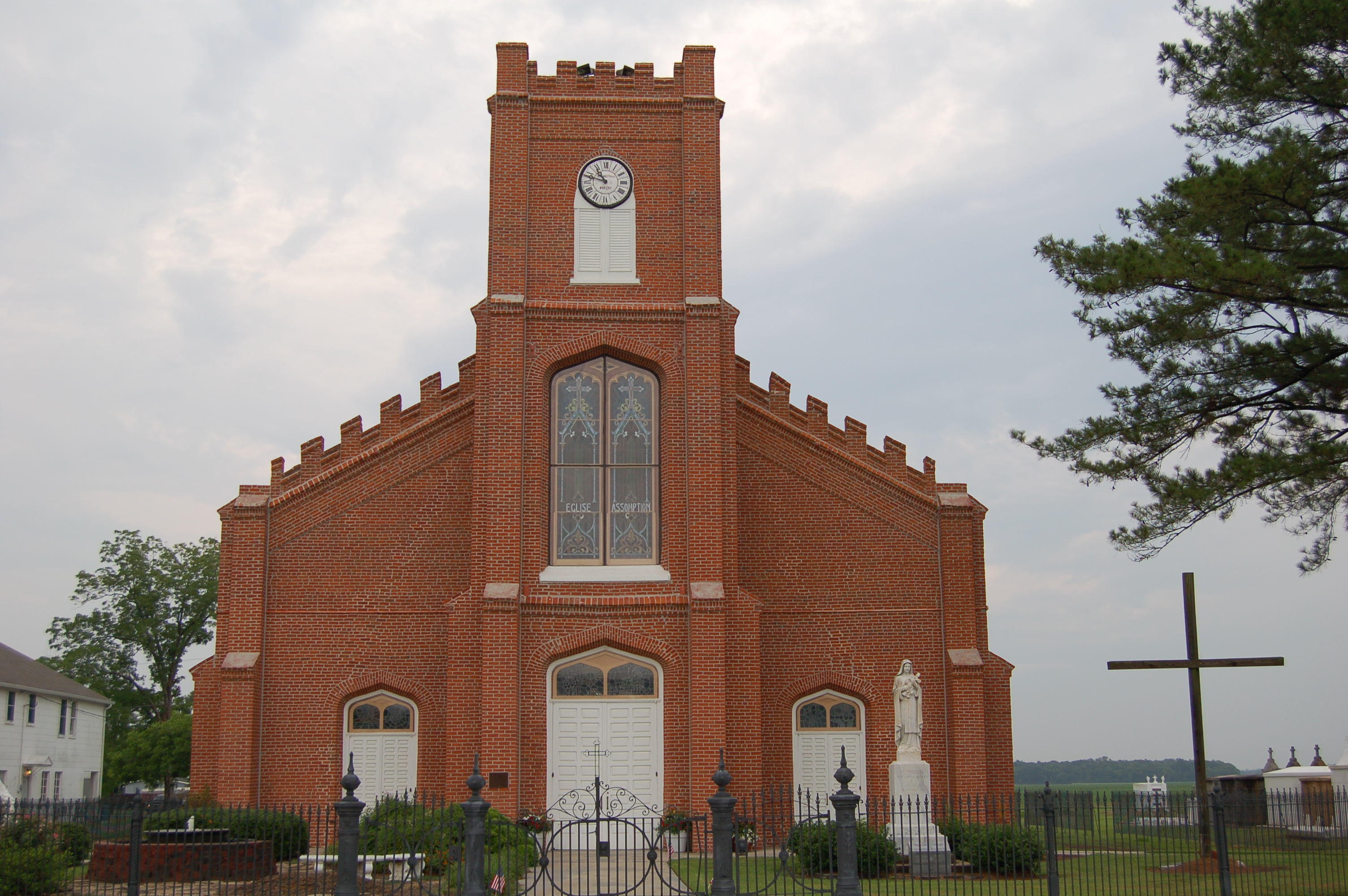

- Location within Louisiana Location within the United States
- Location: At end of Bridge Street, off Louisiana Highway 308, Plattenville, Louisiana
- Coordinates: 29°59′26″N 91°01′25″W
- Area: 6.4 acres (2.6 ha)
- Built: 1856
- Architect: Wilson Grisamore
- Architectural style: Gothic
- NRHP reference No.: 79001051
- Added to NRHP: May 8, 1979

The Church of the Assumption of the Blessed Virgin Mary, also known as the Assumption Church, in Plattenville is a historic Roman Catholic church which was built in 1856. It was added to the National Register of Historic Places in 1979.

The area was settled by Canary Islanders and Acadians from 1779 on and the parish was formed in 1793 with its first church being "little more than a shack". It was replaced by a more permanent one in 1819, which in turn was replaced by this one in 1856, quite close to the site of the 1793 church. The parish's governing "Fabrique", or council of wardens, reportedly appointed a committee to measure the Catholic church in Thibodaux, Louisiana, and

then contracted with one Wilson Grisamore "to build a Church of Assumption for the amount of $13,500 after the plan of the Catholic church of Thibodaux (sic) using the same dimensions, with the bell tower being fifteen feet higher than the one at Thibodaux." This mid-century example of one-upmanship produced a competent English Gothic church which was rendered even more unique in its area by the burning of its model, St. Joseph's Church in Thibodaux, in 1916. The contracted cost of the new church was paid to Mr. Grisamore across a four year period, with an additional sum of $1129.48 being paid him for "extra work" in 1855, and the church seems to have been essentially complete by 1856.

The NRHP nomination describes the church as having

a pitched roof-basilican plan with a central square tower at the narthex. Adjacent to the tower is a stair leading to a small second-floor gallery. The five bay nave terminates in an apsidal chancel with one-story ancillary spaces. The exterior bearing walls are of brick with a timber roof and interior wood columns which were inspired by gothic compound colonettes. The exterior buttresses do not appear to be structural."

As of 1979 the church was approached by a gravel road, and it is located off Louisiana Highway 308.

== See also ==
- National Register of Historic Places listings in Assumption Parish, Louisiana
