= Mary Anne de Boisblanc =

American artist

- Born: October 1, 1925; Labadieville, Louisiana, United States
- Died: December 17, 2015 (aged 90)
- Education: Self-taught
- Known for: Painting
- Style: Folk art

Mary Anne Pecot de Boisblanc (1925-2015) was a self-taught American artist from Louisiana. She was best known for her paintings which depicted Cajun life and culture.

== Biography ==
Born in 1925, Mary Anne de Boisblanc grew up in Labadieville, Louisiana. She first began painting her colorful pieces in the late 1960s, drawing on her memories of growing up in rural Louisiana and her own Cajun heritage. The artist described herself as a "Primitive Naive Acadian Artist." Her work is included in the collections of the West Baton Rouge Museum. Her archives are held in the collection of the Newcomb Center for Research on Women.

Mary Anne de Boisblanc died on December 17, 2015, at the age of 90.

== See also ==
- Folk Art
- Outsider Art
- Naïve art
