= Jordan Mills =

American football player (born 1990)

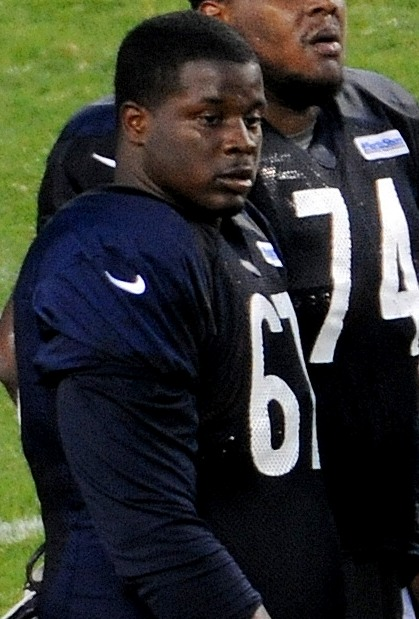
- Mills with the Chicago Bears in 2014

No. 66, 67, 79
- Position: Offensive tackle

Personal information
- Born: December 24, 1990 (age 35); Thibodaux, Louisiana, U.S.
- Listed height: 6 ft 5 in (1.96 m)
- Listed weight: 316 lb (143 kg)

Career information
- High school: Assumption (Napoleonville, Louisiana)
- College: Louisiana Tech
- NFL draft: 2013: 5th round, 163rd overall pick

Career history
- Chicago Bears (2013–2014); Dallas Cowboys (2015); Detroit Lions (2015)*; Buffalo Bills (2015–2018); Miami Dolphins (2019)*; Arizona Cardinals (2019); Dallas Cowboys (2020); Baltimore Ravens (2020)*; TSL Sea Lions (2021); New Orleans Saints (2021); San Francisco 49ers (2022)*
- * Offseason or practice squad member only

Awards and highlights
- Second-team All-WAC (2012)

Career NFL statistics
- Games played: 100
- Games started: 87
- Stats at Pro Football Reference

Jordan Michael Mills (born December 24, 1990) is an American former professional football player who was an offensive tackle in the National Football League (NFL). He played college football for the Louisiana Tech Bulldogs, and was selected by the Chicago Bears of the National Football League (NFL) in the fifth round of the 2013 NFL draft. He also played for the Dallas Cowboys, Buffalo Bills, Arizona Cardinals, and New Orleans Saints.

== Early life ==
Mills attended Assumption High School in Napoleonville, Louisiana. He was a two-time All-District 8-5A selection. He received honorable-mention All-state, All-region and All-tri-parish by the Daily Comet as a senior. He also lettered in basketball for three years. He competed in the shot put on the track team for three years, while helping the school reach the regionals as a junior. He was considered as a three-star recruit by Rivals.com and was rated the 53rd best offensive tackle in the nation.

== College career ==
Mills accepted a football scholarship from Louisiana Tech University over offers from Southern Mississippi and Tulane. As a true freshman in 2009, he saw action in seven games, starting at left tackle in the last five. As a sophomore in 2010, the coaching staff originally planned to redshirt Mills, but a season-ending knee injury to teammate Cudahy Harmon forced the decision to pull the redshirt off him. He played in five games, starting in four at right tackle. As a junior in 2011, he started in all 13 games at right tackle, paving the way for Louisiana Tech's tailbacks to rush for over 1,800 yards. As a senior in 2012, he started in all 12 games at right tackle, earning first-team All-conference honors.

== Professional career ==
Pre-draft measurables
Height	Weight	Arm length	Hand span	40-yard dash	10-yard split	20-yard split	20-yard shuttle	Three-cone drill	Vertical jump	Broad jump	Bench press
6 ft 5 in (1.96 m)	316 lb (143 kg)	34 in (0.86 m)	9 3/4 in (0.25 m)	5.37 s	1.84 s	3.08 s	4.88 s	8.10 s	28.5 in (0.72 m)	8 ft 5 in (2.57 m)	20 reps
All values from NFL Scouting Combine

=== Chicago Bears ===
Mills was selected by the Chicago Bears in the fifth round (163rd overall) of the 2013 NFL draft. On May 1, Mills and sixth-round pick Cornelius Washington were the first draft choices to sign, both signing four-year contracts. After a strong preseason, he won the starting right tackle job over J'Marcus Webb. He would go on to start all sixteen games for the Bears, allowing three sacks in 1,022 plays.

In 2014, he started the first 13 games at right tackle. In the first quarter of week 17 against the Green Bay Packers, Mills suffered a fractured fifth metatarsal bone in his left foot when leaving the field, and required surgery.

In 2015, the Bears hired new head coach John Fox, who brought in a new coaching staff. Mills lost his starting job to second-year player Charles Leno after the second preseason game and was released on September 6.

=== Dallas Cowboys (first stint) ===
On September 7, 2015, the Dallas Cowboys claimed him off waivers. He suffered a foot injury and was declared inactive for the season opener against the New York Giants. On September 14, he was released to make room for offensive tackle Charles Brown.

=== Detroit Lions ===
On September 16, 2015, the Detroit Lions signed Mills to their practice squad.

=== Buffalo Bills ===
Oct 20, 2015, he was signed by the Buffalo Bills from the Detroit Lions' practice squad. He appeared in 10 games with 5 starts at right tackle.

On March 11, 2017, Mills signed a two-year, $4 million contract extension with the Bills. He started all 16 games at right tackle. In 2018, he again started all 16 games at right tackle. He wasn't re-signed after the season.

=== Miami Dolphins ===
On May 9, 2019, Mills signed a one-year, $3 million deal with the Miami Dolphins, to replace the free agent loss of Ja'Wuan James. He missed most of training camp with an undisclosed injury and was waived injured on August 27.

=== Arizona Cardinals ===
On September 10, 2019, Mills was signed by the Arizona Cardinals to replace an injured Marcus Gilbert. On October 5, he was placed on injured reserve with a knee injury. On November 25, he was designated for return from injured reserve and joined the active roster. However, he was not activated by the end of the three-week practice window on December 16, 2019, and remained on injured reserve for the rest of the season. He appeared in three games with two starts and was not re-signed after the season.

=== Dallas Cowboys (second stint) ===
On September 29, 2020, Mills was signed to the Cowboys' practice squad. He was elevated to the active roster on October 24 and December 8 for the team's weeks 7 and 13 games against the Washington Football Team and Baltimore Ravens, and reverted to the practice squad after each game. He was promoted to the active roster on December 19, 2020. On December 29, 2020, Mills was waived by Dallas, then re-signed to their practice squad two days later. He was released after the regular season on January 7, 2021.

=== Baltimore Ravens ===
On January 12, 2021, Mills signed with the practice squad of the Baltimore Ravens. His practice squad contract with the team expired after the season on January 25, 2021.

Mills joined the Sea Lions of The Spring League in May 2021.

=== New Orleans Saints ===
On August 18, 2021, Mills signed with the New Orleans Saints. He was released on August 31, 2021. He was re-signed to the practice squad on September 28. He was promoted to the active roster on October 30.

=== San Francisco 49ers ===
On August 6, 2022, Mills signed with the San Francisco 49ers. He was released on August 30, 2022.

== Personal life ==
His cousin Tramon Williams played cornerback in the NFL. He is also cousins with former running back Brandon Jacobs.
