= St. Elizabeth Catholic Church (Paincourtville, Louisiana) =

Historic church in Louisiana, United States

- U.S. National Register of Historic Places
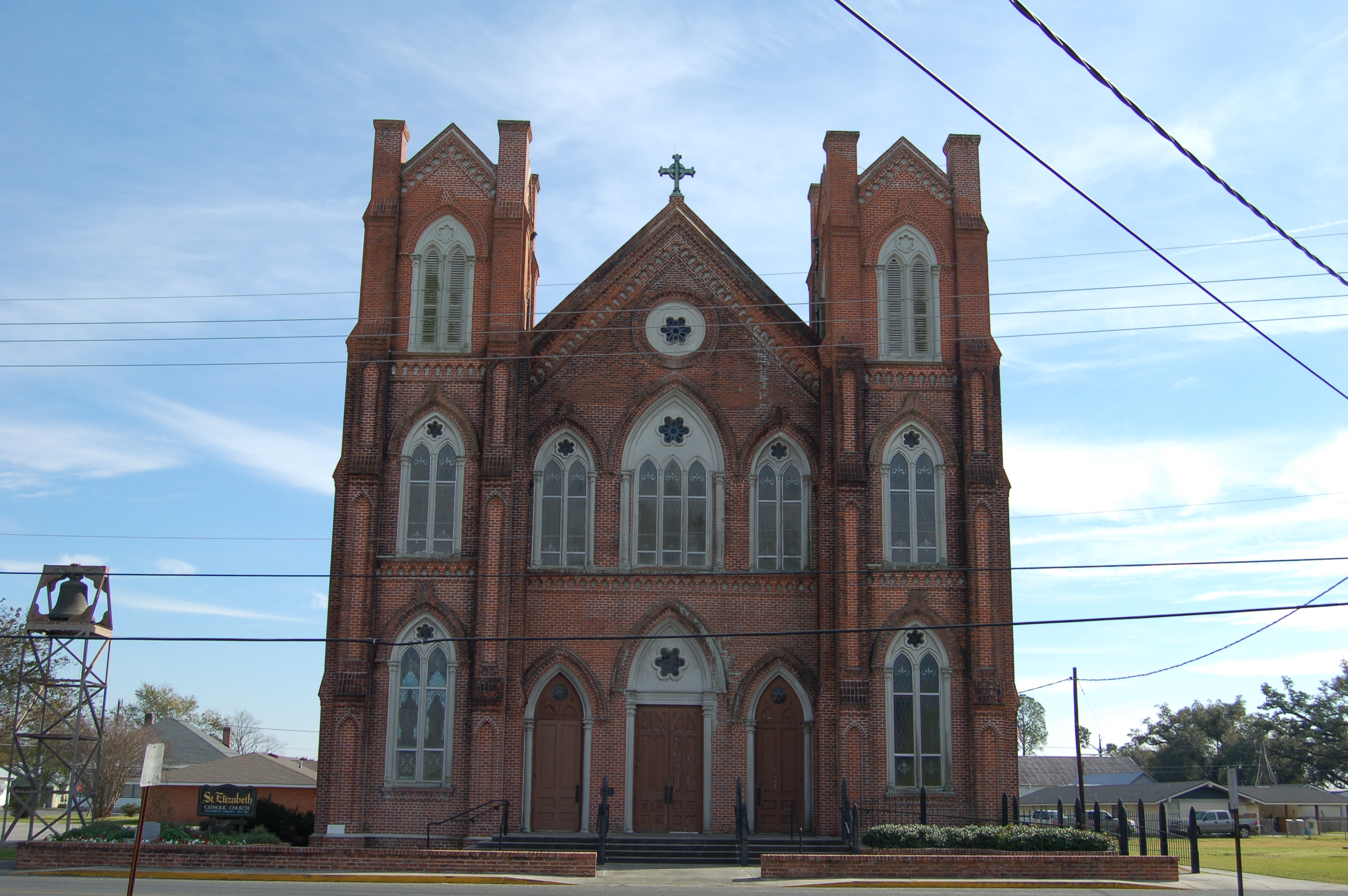

- Location within Louisiana Location within the United States
- Location: 114 Louisiana Highway 403, Paincourtville, Louisiana
- Coordinates: 29°59′30″N 91°03′20″W
- Area: less than one acre
- Built: 1902
- Architect: F. B. Dicharry
- Architectural style: Gothic
- NRHP reference No.: 83000486
- Added to NRHP: March 24, 1983

St. Elizabeth of Hungary Catholic Church is a historic Roman Catholic church is located at 114 Louisiana Highway 403 in Paincourtville, Louisiana, in Assumption Parish. In 2000 the ecclesiastical parish of St. Elizabeth was clustered with St. Jules in Bell Rose, also in the Diocese of Baton Rouge.

== History ==
Antoine Blanc, Bishop of New Orleans, blessed the first church in 1840, but the first permanent pastor was not installed until 1844. The first church was destroyed by fire in 1854 and replaced with a larger wooden church, which was replaced by the current church in 1902.

In 1876, Fr. Jean Baptiste La Saichere, pastor, wrote to the Sisters of Mount Carmel asking for sisters to come to Paincourtville to teach girls. The parish acquired land and built a convent and school for boarding and day students. The school was quickly oversubscribed, and moved to a new building the following year. In 1964, the sisters sold the school to the diocese, which continues to operate it as an interparochial school.

== Architecture ==
The church was modeled after that of Ploubalay, France, from which the La Saicherre brothers, past parish priests, had originated. It is a brick Basilica plan Gothic-style structure with twin towers. It was originally topped with spires, but these were blown down in the 1909 Grand Isle hurricane and never replaced.

Its gable front has a small rose window. Its interior has a small transept, three semi-hexagonal apses, and stained glass windows dating mainly to between 1906 and 1910. It was added to the National Register of Historic Places in 1983.

== See also ==
- National Register of Historic Places listings in Assumption Parish, Louisiana
