= South Lafourche Bridge =

Bridge in Louisiana

Coordinates: 29°28′20″N 90°18′53″W

- Carries: Louisiana Highway 3162, East 90th Street
- Crosses: Bayou Lafourche
- Locale: Town of Galliano, Louisiana

Characteristics
- Design: Vertical-lift bridge
- Total length: 253.8 feet
- Width: 27.8 feet
- Longest span: 104 feet
- Clearance above: 17.4 feet

History
- Construction start: 1972

The South Lafourche Bridge crosses Bayou Lafourche at Louisiana Highway 3162 and East 90th Street in the town of Galliano, Louisiana. Built in 1972, this vertical-lift bridge has a total length of 253.8 feet with its largest span at 104 feet. The bridge deck is 27.8 feet wide, and there is a vertical clearance above the deck of 17.4 feet.
