= Galliano Pontoon Bridge =

Bridge in Louisiana, USA

- Coordinates: 29°26′03″N 90°17′51″W
- Crosses: Bayou Lafourche
- Locale: Galliano, Louisiana

Characteristics
- Design: Pontoon swing bridge
- Total length: 136.2 feet
- Width: 24.9 feet
- Longest span: 71.9 feet

History
- Construction start: 1956
- Construction end: 1956

The Galliano Pontoon Bridge crosses Bayou Lafourche in the town of Galliano, Louisiana. Built in 1956, and rehabilitated in 2009, this pontoon swing bridge has a total length of 136.2 feet with its largest span at 71.9 feet. The bridge deck is 24.9 feet wide. The bridge was shortly closed and reopened in 2023.
