= Lake Palourde =

Lake in Louisiana

- Location in Louisiana Location in United States
- Location: St. Mary, St. Martin, and Assumption Parish, Louisiana, U.S.
- Coordinates: 29.7242°N 91.1420°W
- Type: impounded lake
- Basin countries: United States
- Surface area: 11,520 acres (4,660 ha)
- Average depth: 6 ft (1.8 m)
- Max. depth: 9 ft (2.7 m)
- Shore length^{1}: 16.891 mi (27.183 km)
- Settlements: Morgan City
- ^{1} Shore length is not a well-defined measure.

Lake Palourde, or Palourde Lake is an 11,520-acre (4,660 ha) lake in St. Mary Parish, Louisiana, adjacent to Morgan City, Louisiana.

== Description ==
Morgan City sits on the southwest side of Lake Palourde. US Route 90 runs along the south side, Louisiana Highway 70 on the west side, and Louisiana highway 662 along the southeast side. Avoca Island Cut-off partially encircles the north and east sides of the lake. Lake Verret and Grassy Lake drain into Lake Palourde via the Avoca Island Cut-off. Flat Lake, once connected to Lake Palourde, was isolated by the Highway 70 levee.

Lake Palourde is within three parishes. Assumption Parish covers a small part of the eastern section, from Bayou Cherami to the drainage into Bayou Boeuf, which is also referred to as part of the Avoca Island cutoff. St. Martin Parish covers the northern half down the eastern side bordering Assumption Parish, and the two intersect at the southern end with St. Mary Parish just above Bayou Boeuf. St. Mary Parish covers the southern area and the southwestern half. Bayou Boeuf turns west, splits to the east as Bayou Chene, splitting again with Bayou Black.

== History ==
Lake Palourde was originally called Lac Palourde by early French settlers, and the English translation is "Lake Clam", because of the abundance of clams along the shore. The lake is part of the one-million-acre river swamp of the Atchafalaya Basin.

== Parks ==
Lake Palourde is home to the Victor Guarisco Lake End Park and the 9.6-acre (3.9 ha) Brownell Memorial Park & Carillon Tower. The 106-foot (32 m) tower has 61 bronze bells, cast in the Netherlands, that represents five octaves of range and weight from 18 to 4,730 pounds (8.2 to 2,145.5 kg).

== Incidents ==
In 2010 the body of a man who fell overboard was found. Another woman had also fallen overboard but her body was not found.

In 2016 a manatee was found in Lake Palourde, which is uncommon for south Louisiana.
