= Leeville, Louisiana =

Unincorporated community in Louisiana

Leeville
- Unincorporated community
- Location within Louisiana Location within the United States
- Coordinates: 29°14′59″N 90°12′42″W
- Country: United States
- State: Louisiana
- County: Lafourche Parish
- Established: 1893
- Elevation: 869 ft (265 m)

Population
  - Total: Less than 100
- Time zone: UTC-6 (Central (CST))
  - Summer (DST): UTC-5 (CDT)
- Area code: 985

Leeville is an unincorporated community located in Lafourche Parish, Louisiana.

== History ==
The city was founded in November, 1893 by survivors of the Chenier Caminada Hurricane. The city was first named Orange City but was changed to Leevile in honor of Pierre Charles Lee and his wife Rosalie Albarado. In 1938, Leeville became the oil producing capital of Lafourche Parish with 297 producing wells.

According to studies by the Barataria-Terrebonne National Estuary Program, around 70% of the town's surrounding wetlands have vanished since 1932, which means by 2030 the town could disappear from maps. Five major hurricanes in seven years and the 2010 BP oil spill have been the reason for the high decrease for the number of residents. Scientists estimated that 1 more storm would be the reason for the town's demise and abandonment.

In 2022, a project was started to connect Leeville Bridge to Golden Meadow. The project costs $135 million.
