= La Belle Alliance Cemetery =

WWI CWGC cemetery in Boezinge, Belgium

La Belle Alliance
- Commonwealth War Graves Commission
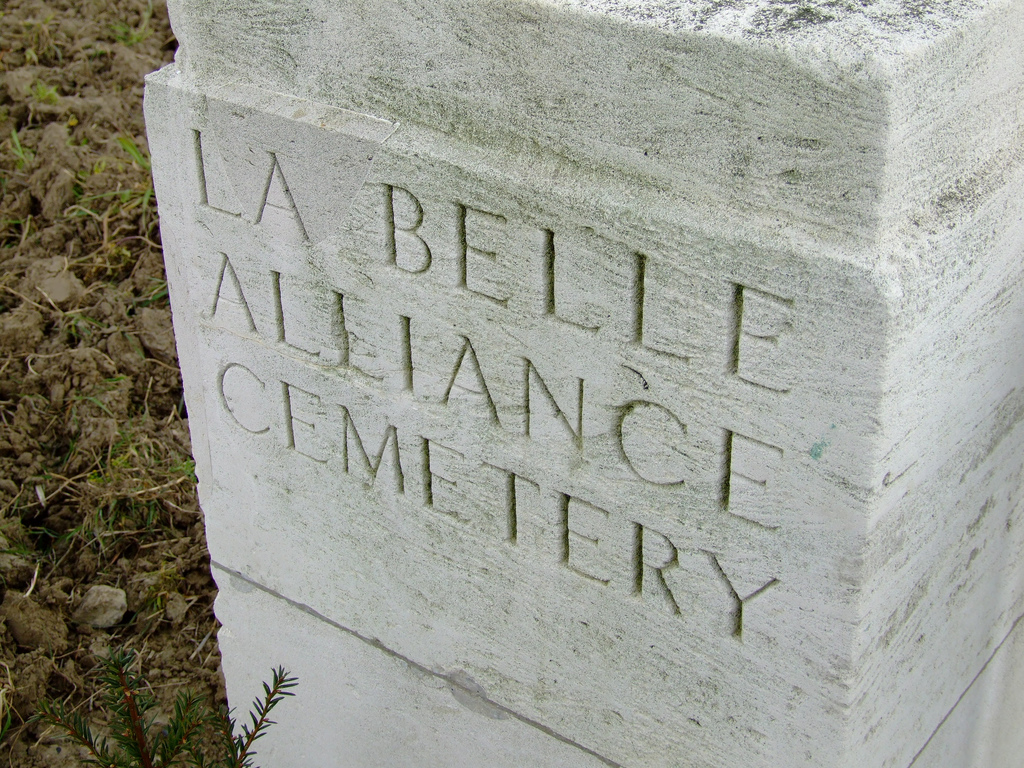
- Used for those deceased 1916–1918
- Established: February 1916
- Location: 50°52′34″N 02°53′38″E near Ypres, West Flanders, Belgium
- Designed by: J R Truelove
- Total burials: 60

Burials by nation
- Allies of World War I: United Kingdom: 60

Burials by war
- World War I: 60

La Belle Alliance Cemetery is a Commonwealth War Graves Commission burial ground for the dead of the First World War located near Ypres (Ieper) in Belgium on the Western Front.

The cemetery grounds were assigned to the United Kingdom in perpetuity by King Albert I of Belgium in recognition of the sacrifices made by the British Empire in the defence and liberation of Belgium during the war.

== Foundation ==
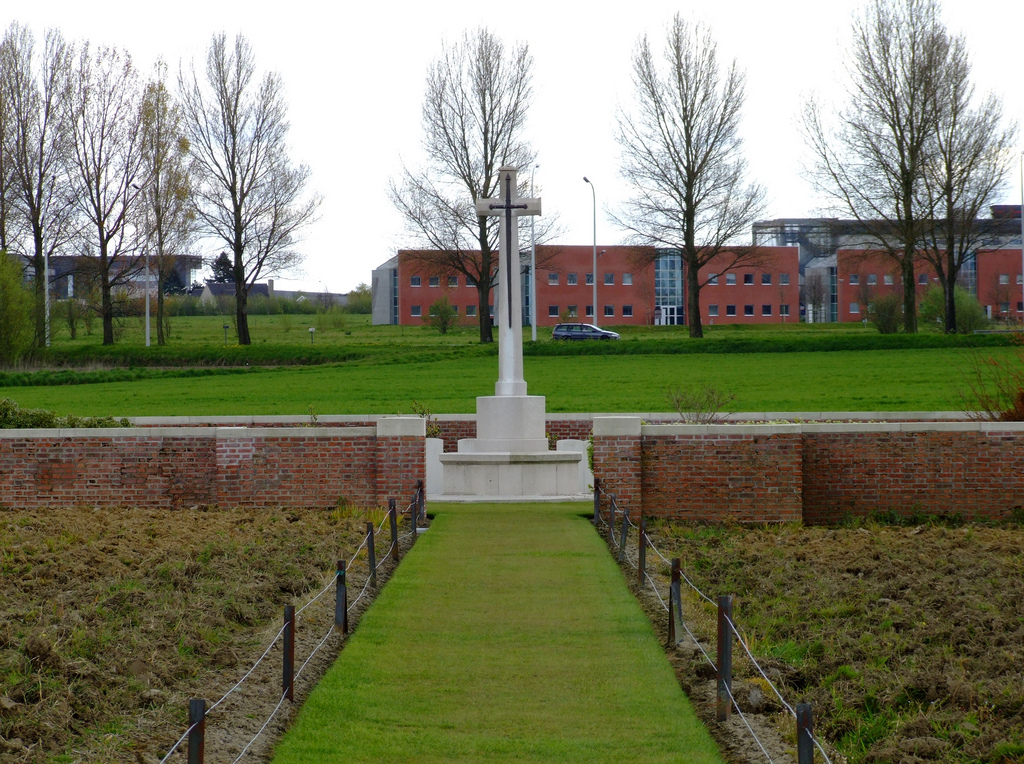
The cemetery's Cross of Sacrifice

The cemetery, named after a nearby farmhouse, was established by the 10th and 11th King's Royal Rifle Corps in February 1916. It was used until March, then opened again in July 1917. It closed in August of that year.

The cemetery was designed by J R Truelove.
