= Golden Meadow Lift Bridge =

Coordinates: 29.3895°N 90.2644°W

The Golden Meadow Lift Bridge crosses Bayou Lafourche in the town of Golden Meadow, Louisiana, and is the southern terminus of LA-308. Built around 1970, this vertical-lift bridge has a total length of 204 feet with its largest span at 104 feet. The bridge deck is 27.8 feet wide, and there is a vertical clearance above the deck of 22.5 feet.
