= Lake Verret =

- Location of Lake Verret in Louisiana Lake Verret (the United States)
- Location: Assumption Parish, Louisiana, United States
- Coordinates: 29.8848°N 91.1517°W
- Type: Natural lake
- Primary inflows: Local bayous and swamp runoff
- Primary outflows: Grassy Lake, Lake Palourde, Atchafalaya River
- Catchment area: 246,000 acres (1,000 km^{2})
- Basin countries: United States
- Surface area: 14,080 acres (57.0 km^{2})
- Average depth: 6 ft (1.8 m)
- Max. depth: 9 ft (2.7 m)
- Shore length^{1}: 36.2 mi (58.3 km)
- Surface elevation: ~2.5 ft (0.76 m) MSL
- Settlements: Pierre Part, Louisiana, Napoleonville, Louisiana, Morgan City, Louisiana
- ^{1} Shore length is not a well-defined measure.

Lake Verret is a 14,080 acres (57.0 km^{2}) natural lake located in Assumption Parish, Louisiana, within the Atchafalaya River Basin of the Lower Mississippi River Region. The lake’s watershed spans approximately 246,000 acres (1,000 km^{2}), including portions of Ascension Parish (22,300 acres), Assumption Parish (104,500 acres), and Iberville Parish (119,200 acres).

== History ==
Lake Verret is named after Nicolas Verret, a French-Canadian explorer and early commandant in the region. A historical monument honoring Nicolas Verret stands in front of the Assumption Parish Courthouse in Napoleonville, Louisiana.

== Geography and hydrology ==
Lake Verret lies within the Atchafalaya Basin, the largest river swamp in the United States. It is a shallow lake with an average depth of 6 ft (1.8 m) and a maximum depth of 9 ft (2.7 m). The lake drains southward into Grassy Lake and Lake Palourde, eventually reaching the Atchafalaya River and the Gulf of Mexico. Seasonal water levels fluctuate due to rainfall and basin hydrology.

== Ecology ==
The lake supports a diverse ecosystem of aquatic vegetation and wildlife. Common plant species include cypress, tupelo, buttonbush, and aquatic grasses. Invasive species such as water hyacinth, salvinia, and hydrilla are periodically managed by the Louisiana Department of Wildlife and Fisheries.

Fish species include largemouth bass, white crappie, bluegill, channel catfish, and bowfin.

== Recreation ==
Lake Verret is popular for boating, fishing, birdwatching, and hunting. Public boat launches include Attakapas Landing and Belle River Landing. The surrounding cypress swamps offer scenic opportunities for kayaking and photography.

== Elm Hall Wildlife Management Area ==
The Elm Hall Wildlife Management Area (2,839 acres) borders the northeast side of Lake Verret. Managed by LDWF, it features cypress-tupelo swamps and bottomland hardwoods, providing habitat for bald eagles, wood ducks, and migratory waterfowl. Activities include hunting, fishing, camping, and birding. Access is by boat only.

== Environmental management ==
Lake Verret faces challenges from invasive aquatic plants and sedimentation. LDWF conducts annual vegetation surveys and treatments to maintain navigation and ecological balance. Problematic species include water hyacinth, salvinia, and Peruvian watergrass.

== See also ==
- Atchafalaya Basin
- Lake Palourde
- Grassy Lake (Louisiana)
- Elm Hall Wildlife Management Area
