= Belle Alliance, Louisiana =

Belle Alliance
- Unincorporated community
- Location of Belle Alliance in Louisiana
- Coordinates: 30°3′5″N 91°1′13″W
- Country: United States
- State: Louisiana
- Parish: Assumption

Area
  - Total: 2.5 sq mi (6.5 km^{2})
  - Land: 2.5 sq mi (6.5 km^{2})
  - Water: 0.0 sq mi (0 km^{2})
- Elevation: 26 ft (7.9 m)
- Time zone: UTC-6 (CST)
  - Summer (DST): UTC-5 (CDT)
- Area code: 225

Belle Alliance is an unincorporated community in Assumption Parish, Louisiana, United States. It is part of the Pierre Part Micropolitan Statistical Area.

== History ==
Belle Alliance is named after the Belle Alliance Plantation located on the east bank of Bayou Lafourche in Assumption Parish, about five miles (8 km) out of Donaldsonville. During the 1770s, this 7,000-acre (28 km^{2}) plot was granted to Don Juan Vives, a physician and military officer of the Spanish government. The actual Belle Alliance Plantation was built by a successful sugar planter Charles Anton Kock, also owner of St. Emma Plantation around 1846.

Rev. H. C. Cotton was active in Belle Alliance. He was a Baptist church leader and organizer.

Today, the site is known as the community of Belle Alliance. The plantation is listed on the National Register of Historic Places.
