= Belle Alliance (1815 ship) =

History

United Kingdom
- Namesake: La Belle Alliance
- Owner: J.Vidamour
- Builder: Barry Patourel, Glategny, St Peter Port, Guernsey
- Launched: 1815
- Fate: Wrecked 8 March 1823

General characteristics
- Tons burthen: 140, or 14015/74 (bm)
- Sail plan: Brig

Belle Alliance was the first large ship built in Guernsey. Barry Patourel built her in 1815 at Glatigny for J.Vidamour.

The Lieutenant Governor of Guernsey, Sir John Doyle, was present at the launching and presented Belle Alliance with an ensign.

On 30 September 1815, she was in harbour with B.Le Patourel, master.

In 1816, under the command of Edward Bayles, she made a voyage to Taragona and Rio de Janeiro.

In 1817, she was under the command of T. de Putron. In 1819, she was under the command of P.Collas.

Belle Alliance, Warman, master, was lost on 8 March 1823, on the Goodwin Sands, Kent. Her crew were rescued. She was on a voyage from Antwerp to Guernsey.
