= Marie-Agnès Labarre =

French politician (born 1945)

Assembly Member for Essonne department
- In office 8 January 2010 – 30 September 2011
- Preceded by: Jean-Luc Mélenchon

Personal details
- Born: 12 June 1945 (age 80)
- Party: Left Party

Marie-Agnès Labarre (born 12 June 1945) is a former member of the Senate of France, who represented the Essonne department. She is a member of the Communist, Republican, and Citizen Group. She is a member of the Left Party, prior to which she was a member of the PS. In November 1999, Labarre was elevated as a Chevalier in the Ordre national du Mérite.
