= LaBarre House =

- U.S. National Register of Historic Places
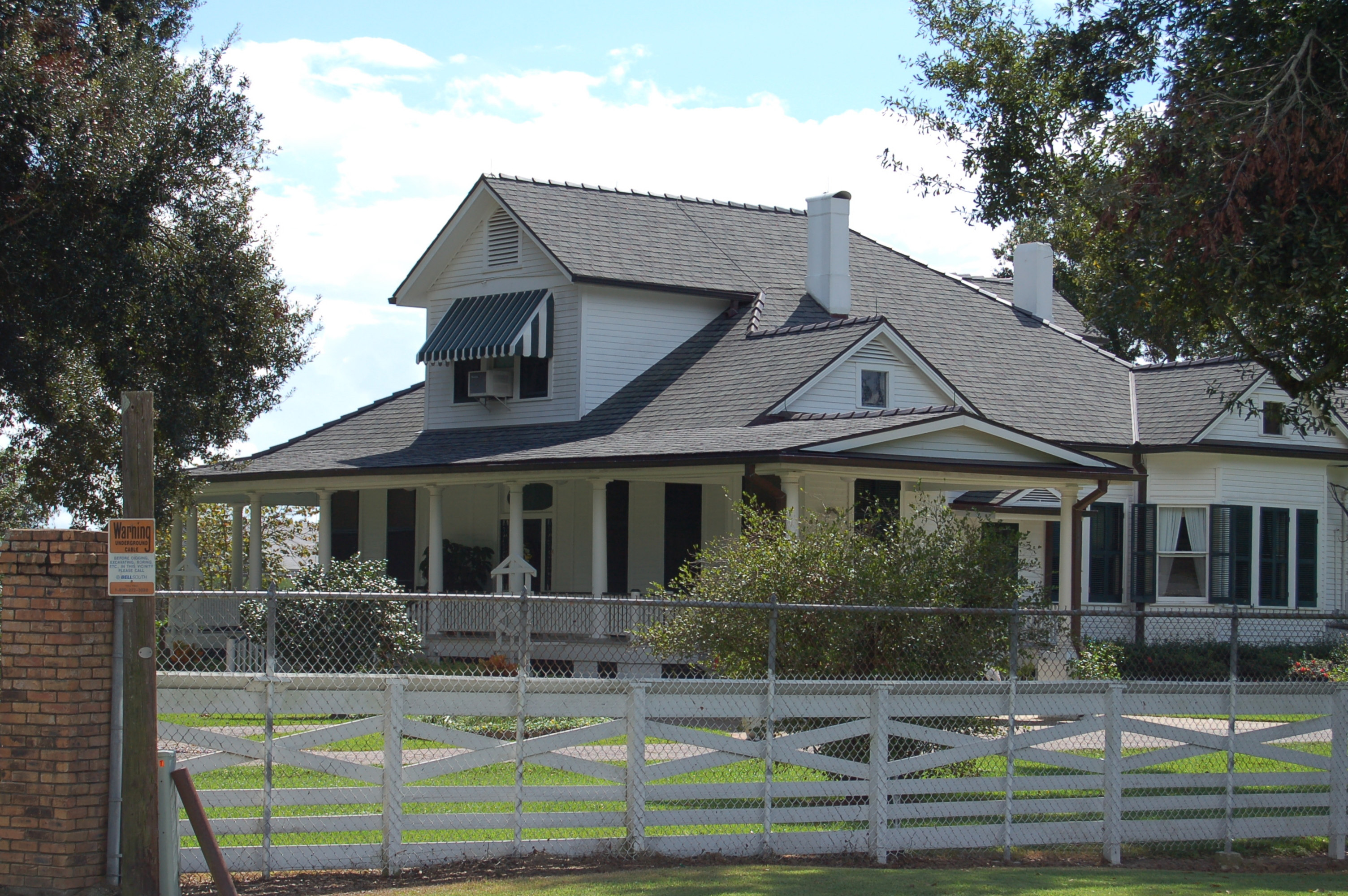

- Location within Louisiana
- Nearest city: Napoleonville, Louisiana
- Coordinates: 29.9266°N 91.00005°W
- Area: 4.7 acres (1.9 ha)
- Built: 1909
- Architectural style: Queen Anne
- NRHP reference No.: 08001019
- Added to NRHP: October 31, 2008

The LaBarre House, in Assumption Parish, Louisiana, near Napoleonville, Louisiana, was built in 1909. It was listed on the National Register of Historic Places in 2008.

Architecture: Queen Anne Free Classic

It is located at 4371 Louisiana Highway 1, about 1.7 miles (2.7 km) southeast of Napoleonville.

Develop about Queen Anne free classic per this nom doc's discussion from McAlester.
