= Belle Alliance (1817 ship) =

History

United Kingdom
- Name: Belle Alliance
- Namesake: La Belle Alliance
- Builder: James Macrae, Chittagong
- Laid down: 1 December 1815,
- Launched: 17 April 1817, or 1817
- Nickname(s): The Bell of Lions (Note: In recollections of a voyage c.1823.)
- Fate: Last listed 1854

General characteristics
- Tons burthen: 627, or 637, or 650, or 67692/94, or 677, or 700 (bm)
- Length: 126 ft 3 in (38.5 m)
- Beam: 34 ft 9 in (10.6 m)

Belle Alliance was launched at Chittagong in 1817. She moved her registry to England. In 1820 she carried settlers to South Africa. She then traded with India initially under a license from the British East India Company, which trade continued after the company's demise. In 1847 she carried emigrants to Adelaide, South Australia. She was last listed in 1854.

== Career ==
In 1819 Belle Alliance appeared on the registry at Calcutta with William Rolfe, master, and Alexander & Co., owners.

On 12 February 1820 Captain Rolfe sailed from London with 307 settlers bound for South Africa under the auspices of the British government's 1820 Settlers scheme. Belle Alliance arrived at Table Bay on 2 May and shortly thereafter arrived at Algoa Bay, Elizabethtown.

On 28 December 1821 a gale at Portsmouth drove Belle Alliance, Rolfe, master, out to sea. She had to cut away one anchor and broke the stock on the other. She was on her way to India. By 23 January she was at Santiago, Cape Verde; she reached Madras prior to 11 May.

Year	Master	Owner	Trade	Source & notes
1825	W. Rolfe	Rolfe & Co.	London–Calcutta	LR
1830	H. Hunter	Hunter	London–Calcutta	LR
1830	Hunter	Captain & Co.	London–India	RS
1835	C. Arkcoll			LR

On 13 November 1840 Belle Alliance arrived at Saint Helena. Two days later her passengers and crew joined the procession that carried Napoleon's body from his grave to the wharf where it was to the frigate Belle Poule was to convey it to France to be reburied. The crew of Belle Alliance wore ribbons around their hats with in letters of gold "La Belle Alliance".

Year	Master	Owner	Trade	Source & notes
1840	C. Arkoll; Price	Farncomb; J.Somes	London–Madras; London Transport	LR; small repairs 1836 & 1837

On 26 February 1841 Belle Alliance left England with provisions and stores that she was carrying to China. She remained there until her discharge on 30 November.

Year	Master	Owner	Trade	Source & notes
1845	West	J. Somes	London–Gibraltar	LR

On 28 February 1847 Belle Alliance, Abraham Van Der Vord, master, left London with settlers for South Australia. She stopped at Plymouth on 8 March. Near Madeira she encountered a gale that carried away her main top mast. She returned to Plymouth and after affecting repairs sailed again on 4 April. She arrived at Adelaide on 30 June with 291 emigrants. Port-to-port the voyage had taken 88 days, a remarkably fast transit.

Then on 6 July she ran aground at Adelaide.

Belle Alliance sailed on 16 August for Singapore, in ballast.

Year	Master	Owner	Trade	Source & notes
1850	D. Stephens	J.&F. Somes	London–Calcutta	LR; small repairs 1848
1854	G. Bawdens	Somes, brothers		LR
