= Bayou Lafourche =

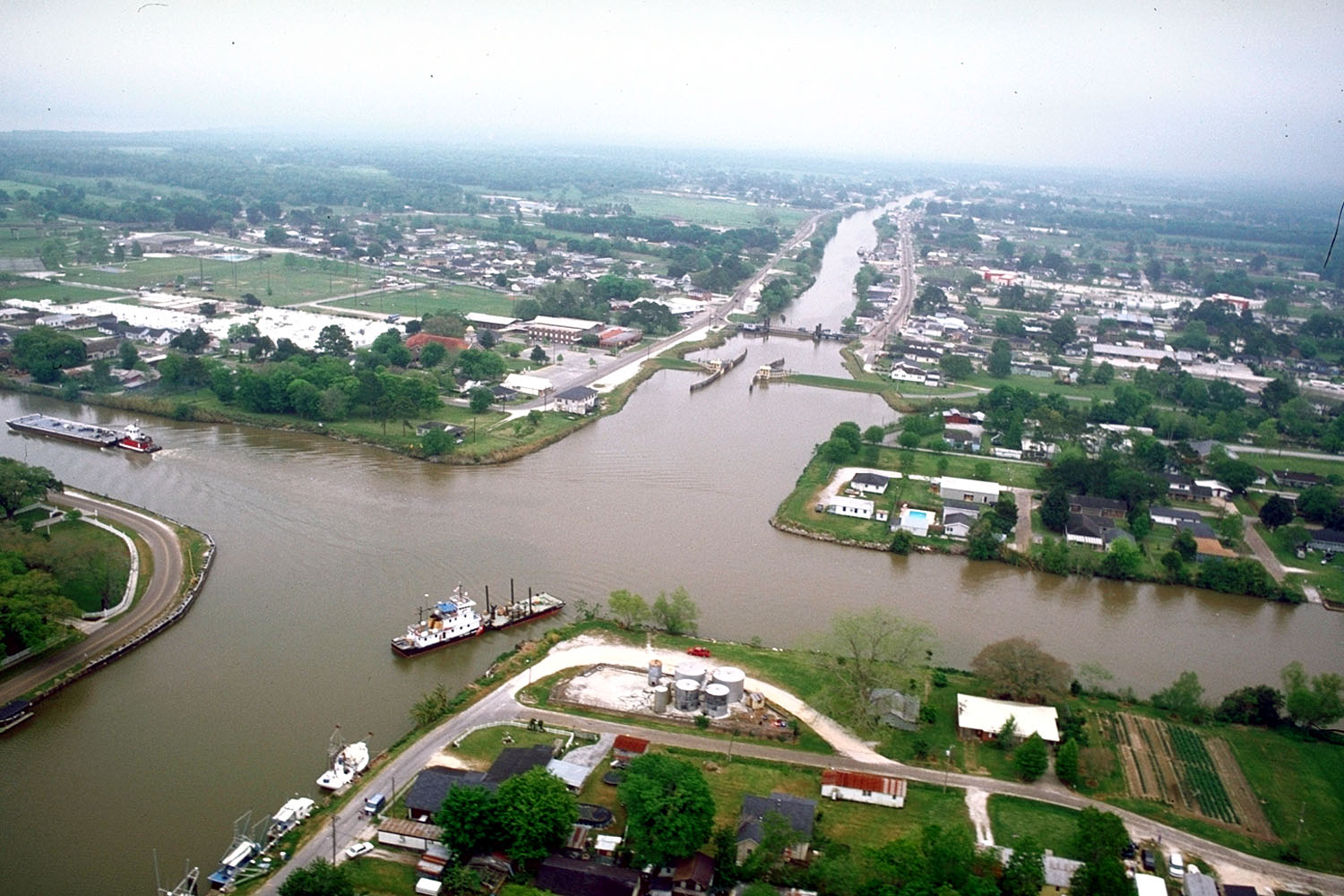
- The intersection of Bayou Lafourche and the Gulf Intracoastal Waterway at Larose, Louisiana. View is to the east-southeast. The bayou runs off towards the Gulf at the top. The waterway crosses the picture left–right. The U.S. Army Corps of Engineers has installed a floodgate on the bayou, visible at center.
- Bayou Lafourche

Location
- Country: United States
- State: Louisiana
- Parishes: Ascension; Assumption; Lafourche

Physical characteristics
- Source: Mississippi River
  - location: Donaldsonville, Louisiana
  - coordinates: 30°6′N 91°0′W
- Mouth: Gulf of Mexico
  - location: Between Timbalier Bay and Caminada Bay
  - coordinates: 29°N 90°W
- Length: 106 mi (171 km)

Basin features
- Cities: Donaldsonville; Paincourtville; Plattenville; Napoleonville; Labadieville; Thibodaux; Raceland; Lockport; Larose; Cut Off; Belle Amie; Galliano; Golden Meadow

Bayou Lafourche (/ləˈfuːʃ/ lə-FOOSH), originally called Chetimachas River or La Fourche des Chetimaches (the fork of the Chitimacha), is a 106-mile-long (171 km) bayou in southeastern Louisiana, United States, that flows into the Gulf of Mexico. It was formerly a natural distributary of the Mississippi River; its source was sealed from the Mississippi by a dam in 1904, but since 1950 a water pump station has provided flow to the bayou.

The bayou is flanked by Louisiana Highway 1 on the west and Louisiana Highway 308 on the east, and is known as "the longest Main Street in the world." It flows through parts of Ascension, Assumption, and Lafourche parishes. Today, approximately 300,000 Louisiana residents drink water drawn from the bayou.

== History ==
The name Lafourche is from the French for "the fork", and alludes to the bayou's large outflow of Mississippi River water. The first settlements of Acadians in southern Louisiana were near Bayou Lafourche and Bayou des Écores, which led to a close association of the bayou with Cajun culture.

It was formerly a Mississippi River outlet (distributary), but was dammed at Donaldsonville in 1904. The dam cut off nourishment and replenishment of a huge wetland area of central Louisiana. It changed the formerly flowing bayou into a stagnant ditch.

The Bollinger Shipyards, founded by Donald G. Bollinger, was launched on Bayou Lafourche in 1946.

On August 29, 2021, Hurricane Ida made landfall in Lafourche parish. Dam walls at the end of the bayou were closed to prevent a storm surge of salt water from entering.

On July 27, 2024, a 3-mile stretch of the bayou in Raceland faced an oil spill breach. The leak was caused by a valve failure at a Crescent Midstream crude oil facility and the resulting discharge travelled into the bayou from a storm drain. The spill was contained by parish officials and the community's drinking water was not affected.

=== Mississippi River reintroduction ===
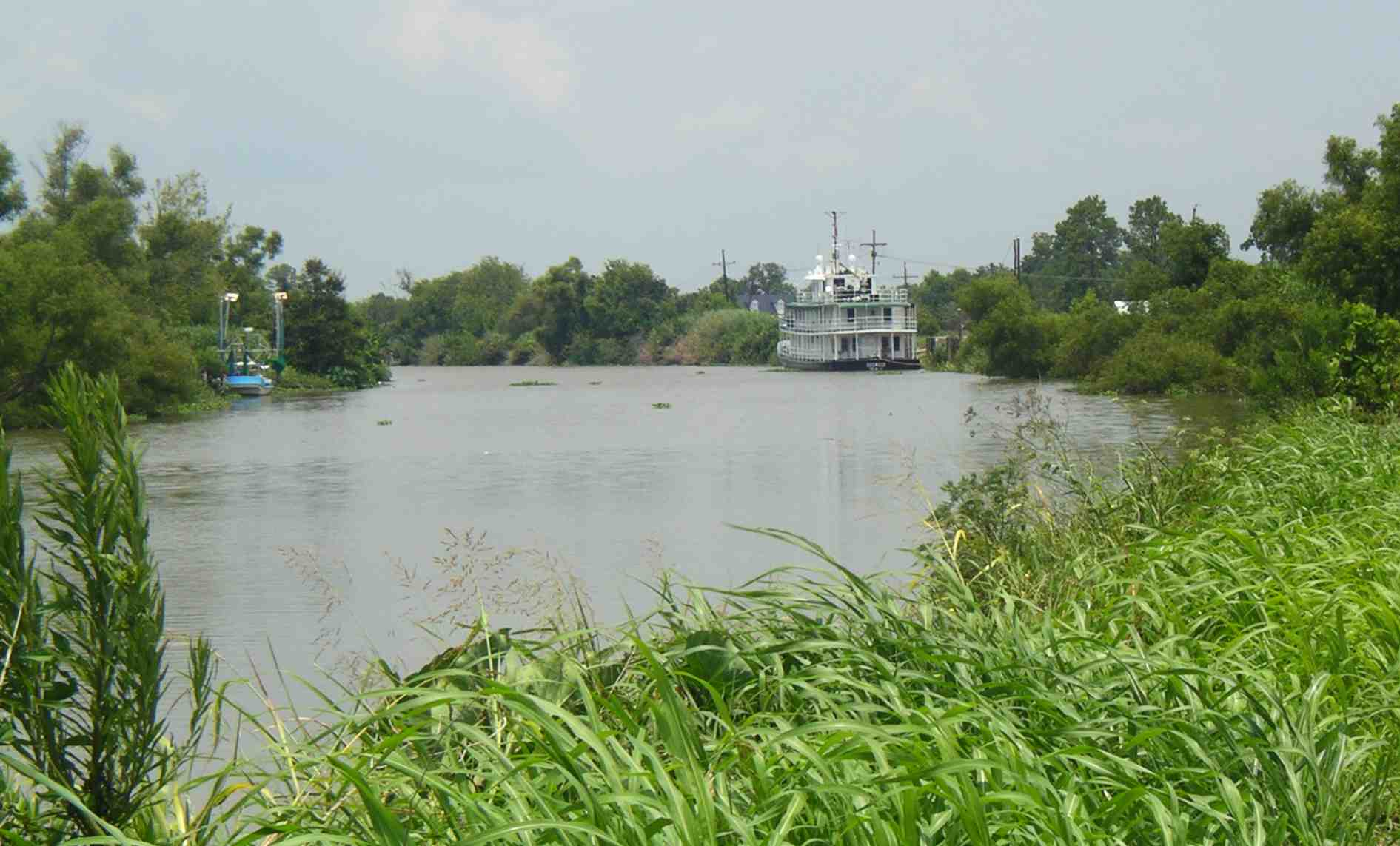
Riverboat on Bayou Lafourche.

In 1950, a water pumping station was constructed at the bayou's source at the Mississippi River.

A long-term project to revitalize Bayou Lafourche with an increased flow of fresh water from the Mississippi River and halt the accelerated loss of land down the bayou is currently in progress.

In 2016, Bayou Lafourche was dredged from Donaldsonville to Napoleonville of vegetation and sediment that constricted the surface area of the water. In Lockport, a water gate was constructed on Bayou Lafourche to mitigate the amount of salt water invading the bayou during periods of low tide. In 2021, a weir was removed in Thibodaux, allowing recreational boating passage through the entire bayou.

By 2027, a $230 million pumping station is set to be completed in Donaldsonville, next to the original that was constructed in 1950. The new station will be able to pump three times the amount of fresh water from the Mississippi River than the original and, in turn, return the flow of water throughout the bayou during low tides.

== Crossings ==
From north to south, the following roads and railroads cross the bayou (almost all connecting LA 1 to LA 308):

- LA 3089 (Albert Street) in Donaldsonville
- Union Pacific Railroad Livonia Subdivision in Donaldsonville
- Rondinaud Road in Donaldsonville
- LA 943
- LA 998 at Belle Rose
- LA 70
- LA 403 at Paincourtville
- LA 70 Spur
- Bridge Street at Plattenville
- LA 402, Hospital Rd. at Napoleonville
- former Texas and Pacific Railway (now open to non-motorized traffic)
- LA 1008 at Napoleonville
- LA 1010 at Ingleside
- LA 1011 at Supreme
- LA 1247 at Labadieville
- St. John Bridge
- LA 3185
- Tiger Drive (Replaced in 2014)
- former railroad in Thibodaux
- LA 20 (St. Patrick Street) in Thibodaux
- Canal Boulevard in Thibodaux (To be replaced in 2027)
- Banker Drive (no motor vehicles) in Thibodaux
- Audubon Avenue in Thibodaux
- LA 648 Near Bayou Country Club
- Lafourche Crossing, BNSF Railway/Union Pacific Railroad Lafayette Subdivision at Lafourche
- LA 649 (St. Charles Swing Bridge) at St. Charles
- Raceland Lift Span Bridge
- LA 182 (Raceland Lift Bridge) at Raceland
- US 90
- former LA 364
- LA 654 (Champagne-Harrelson Memorial Bridge)
- LA 655 (Rita Bridge) at Lockport
- LA 3220 (Bollinger Bridge)
- Valentine Bridge at Valentine
- T-Bois Bridge
- Former LA 310 Pontoon Bridge at Larose
- LA 657 Vertical Lift Bridge at Larose
- Le Pont D'or Bridge at Larose
- Cote Blanche Bridge at Cut Off
- LA 3162 (South Lafourche Bridge) at Galliano
- Galliano Pontoon Bridge at Galliano
- Airport Rd in Galliano (newest bridge opened in 2026)
- LA 308 (Golden Meadow Lift Bridge) in Golden Meadow
- LA 1 (Gateway to the Gulf Expressway) at Leeville

== In popular culture ==
The film Southern Comfort is set on Bayou Lafourche.

At the end of the novel Post Office by Charles Bukowski, protagonist Henry Chinaski quits his job at the Los Angeles post office to "pick up 10 or 20 grand for 3 months trapping at Bayou La Fourche. [...] Muskrats, nutria, mink, otter... coon. All I need is a pirogue."

In The CW Network's supernatural-fantasy series, The Originals, the Bayou Lafourche is a major setting and has acted as the home of the Werewolf encampments for decades after the Vampires exiled them from the city of New Orleans.

In the film Hard Target, the lead character Chance Boudreaux, played by Jean-Claude Van Damme, is a Cajun from Bayou Lafourche in Southern Louisiana.

== See also ==
- Nicholls State University
- Battle of LaFourche Crossing
