= Napoleonville, Louisiana =

Napoleonville
- Village
- Village of Napoleonville
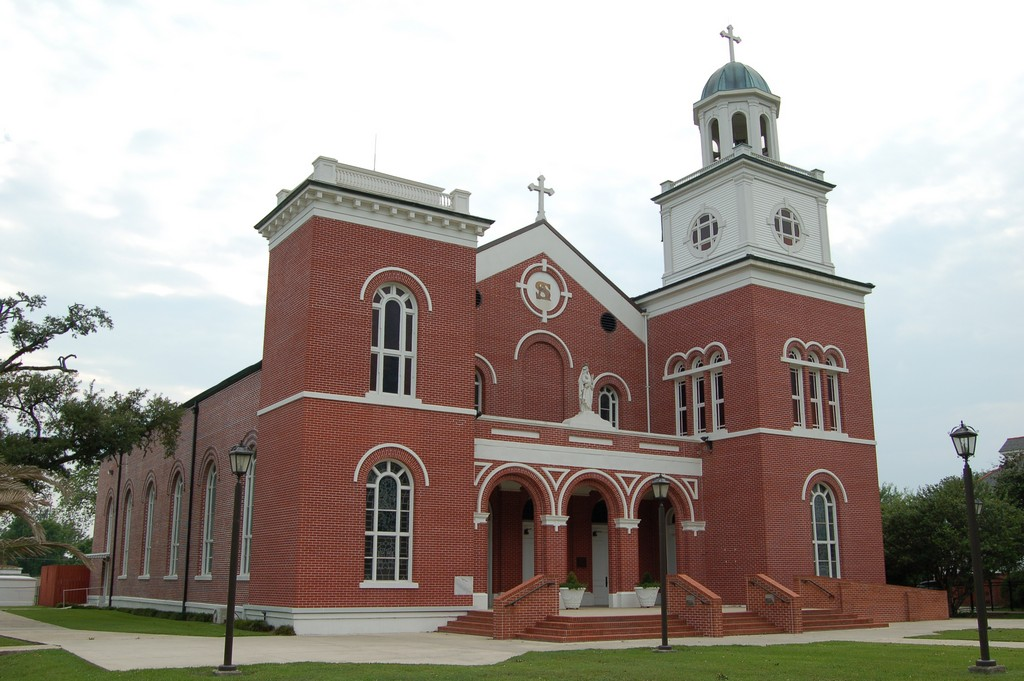
- St. Anne Catholic Church off St. Joseph St.

- Location of Napoleonville in Assumption Parish, Louisiana.

- Location within Louisiana Location within the United States
- Coordinates: 29°56′16″N 91°01′36″W
- Country: United States
- State: Louisiana
- Parish: Assumption
- Named for: Napoleon Bonaparte

Government
  - Mayor: Ron Animashaun (D)

Area
  - Total: 0.17 sq mi (0.44 km^{2})
  - Land: 0.17 sq mi (0.44 km^{2})
  - Water: 0 sq mi (0.00 km^{2})

Population (2020)
  - Total: 540
  - Density: 3,205.0/sq mi (1,237.47/km^{2})
- Time zone: UTC-6 (CST)
  - Summer (DST): UTC-5 (CDT)
- ZIP code: 70390
- Area code: 985
- FIPS code: 22-53370
- Website: napoleonvillela.com

Napoleonville is a village and the parish seat of Assumption Parish in the U.S. state of Louisiana. The population was 660 at the 2010 census. It is part of the Pierre Part Micropolitan Statistical Area. The village is best known as the location where the film Because of Winn-Dixie, based on Kate DiCamillo's Newbery Prize-winning novel, was shot. The book was set in (fictional) Naomi, Florida.

== History ==
As early as 1807, the community that later became Napoleonville was known as Canal, a name derived from a man-made waterway that extended west from the settlement to Lake Verret. This canal served as an important transportation link for goods and people in the early 19th century.

The village was later named Napoleonville by a former French soldier, Pierre Charlet, who had served under Napoleon Bonaparte. Charlet immigrated to Louisiana after the Napoleonic Wars and settled in Assumption Parish; he is buried in the cemetery of Our Lady of the Assumption Catholic Church in nearby Plattenville.

The first permanent European settlements in this region were established by French and Spanish colonists (including Isleños) during the mid-18th century along Bayou Lafourche, between the present towns of Donaldsonville and Napoleonville. From 1755 to 1785, the population grew significantly due to the arrival of Acadians, exiled during the Great Upheaval, who cleared land and built homes along the bayou.

Napoleonville became the parish seat when Assumption Parish was created on March 31, 1807, from Lafourche County. The town was officially incorporated on March 11, 1878, following an act of the Louisiana Legislature.

Throughout the 19th century, Napoleonville grew as a center of commerce and culture along Bayou Lafourche. Sugarcane cultivation became the dominant economic activity in the region by the 1860s and remains important today. The town also served as a hub for French-language journalism; the Pionnier de l’Assomption newspaper, founded in 1850, later became the Pioneer of Assumption and documented local life for decades.

A historical marker near the Assumption Parish Courthouse notes that Napoleonville lies on an early travel route (1730–1770) used by French and Acadian settlers moving between St. James Parish and the Attakapas region near Lake Verret.

A national historic landmark in Napoleonville is the Madewood Plantation, a former sugar cane plantation. The mansion was built in 1846 in a Greek Revival style. It was the first major work of architect Henry Howard and consisted of a manor house, out buildings and 10,000 acres. It is located along the Bayou Lafourche and has been restored. At one time Madewood Plantation was open to the public and used as a bed and breakfast resort and for wedding parties. Guests claimed that the master bedroom was haunted and that the ghosts of slave children tickled their feet playfully at night. The Madewood manor house and 18 acres sold in June 2026 to a private owner for over $1,700,000 and it is no longer open to the public.

== Geography ==
Napoleonville is located at 29°56′16″N 91°1′36″W (29.937778, -91.026750). According to the United States Census Bureau, the village has a total area of 0.15 square miles (0.4 km^{2}), all land.

== Demographics ==
Historical population
Census	Pop.	Note	%±
1880	497		—
1890	723		45.5%
1900	945		30.7%
1910	1,201		27.1%
1920	1,171		−2.5%
1930	1,180		0.8%
1940	1,301		10.3%
1950	1,260		−3.2%
1960	1,148		−8.9%
1970	1,008		−12.2%
1980	829		−17.8%
1990	802		−3.3%
2000	686		−14.5%
2010	660		−3.8%
2020	540		−18.2%
2025 (est.)	500	▼	−7.4%
U.S. Decennial Census

Napoleonville racial composition as of 2020
Race	Number	Percentage
White (non-Hispanic)	84	15.56%
Black or African American (non-Hispanic)	428	79.26%
Native American	1	0.19%
Other/Mixed	12	2.22%
Hispanic or Latino	15	2.78%

As of the 2020 United States census, there were 540 people, 229 households, and 137 families residing in the village.

== Notable people ==
- Troy E. Brown, former member of the Louisiana State Senate and native of Napoleonville
- Paul Carmouche, former district attorney for Caddo Parish
- Papa Celestin, jazz bandleader
- Philip H. Gilbert, politician, former lieutenant governor
- Joe Harrison, state representative
- Brandon Jacobs, retired NFL running back
- Samuel A. LeBlanc I, state representative, state court judge, justice of the Louisiana Supreme Court from 1949 to 1954
- Charlie Melançon, former U.S. representative
- Jordan Mills, NFL offensive lineman
- J.C. Politz, sportscaster
- Tramon Williams, NFL cornerback
- Kim Willoughby, Team USA Volleyball (2008 Beijing Olympics)

== National Guard ==
The village is home to the 928th Sapper Company, a combat engineer unit of the 769th Engineer Battalion of the Louisiana Army National Guard which in turn is headquartered at Baton Rouge. Both of these units belong to the 225th Engineer Brigade headquartered at Louisiana National Guard Training Center Pineville near Pineville.

== Twin towns ==
The town maintains twinning links with:

- (France)

Pontivy (Napoléonville in 1804), France since 1989
