= National Register of Historic Places listings in West Baton Rouge Parish, Louisiana =

Location of West Baton Rouge Parish in Louisiana

This is a list of the National Register of Historic Places listings in West Baton Rouge Parish, Louisiana.

This is intended to be a complete list of the properties on the National Register of Historic Places in West Baton Rouge Parish, Louisiana, United States. The locations of National Register properties for which the latitude and longitude coordinates are included below, may be seen in a map.

There are 16 properties listed on the National Register in the parish. One property was once listed, but has since been removed.

This National Park Service list is complete through NPS recent listings posted December 12, 2025.

== Current listings ==
| | Name on the Register | Image | Date listed | Location | City or town | Description |
|---|---|---|---|---|---|---|
| 1 | Aillet House | Aillet House | August 9, 1991 (#91001046) | 845 N. Jefferson Ave. 30°27′35″N 91°12′22″W | Port Allen | Permanent exhibit on the grounds of the West Baton Rouge Museum |
| 2 | Allendale Plantation Historic District | Allendale Plantation Historic District | November 1, 1996 (#96001263) | Junction of N. River Rd. and Allendale Rd. 30°29′45″N 91°16′24″W | Port Allen | |
| 3 | Antonia | Antonia | August 1, 2008 (#08000743) | 4626 S. River Rd. 30°24′09″N 91°13′18″W | Port Allen | (Louisiana's French Creole Architecture MPS) |
| 4 | Bank of Addis | Bank of Addis | February 13, 1992 (#92000038) | 7843 Ray Rivet St. 30°21′16″N 91°15′59″W | Addis | |
| 5 | Cinclare Sugar Mill Historic District | Cinclare Sugar Mill Historic District | April 23, 1998 (#98000394) | Junction of Louisiana Highway 1 and Terrell Dr. 30°23′46″N 91°13′55″W | Brusly vicinity | Previously the Marengo Plantation |
| 6 | D'Agostino Building | | September 14, 2020 (#100005598) | 110 North Jefferson Ave. 30°27′09″N 91°12′19″W | Port Allen | |
| 7 | Hebert House | Hebert House | October 7, 1993 (#93001032) | 919 E. Main St. 30°23′13″N 91°14′02″W | Brusly | |
| 8 | Homestead Plantation | | September 22, 2016 (#16000674) | 1323 N. River Rd. 30°28′00″N 91°12′11″W | Port Allen | |
| 9 | Monte Vista Plantation House | Monte Vista Plantation House | June 9, 1980 (#80001769) | North of Port Allen; 30°30′10″N 91°12′11″W | Port Allen | |
| 10 | Old Brusly High School Gymnasium | Old Brusly High School Gymnasium | September 20, 2007 (#07000983) | 601 N. Kirkland Dr. 30°23′24″N 91°13′58″W | Brusly | |
| 11 | Poplar Grove Plantation House | Poplar Grove Plantation House | December 14, 1987 (#87002136) | 3142 N. River Rd. 30°29′35″N 91°12′09″W | Port Allen | |
| 12 | Port Allen High School | Port Allen High School | April 20, 1989 (#89000326) | 610 Rosedale St. 30°27′50″N 91°12′26″W | Port Allen | |
| 13 | St. Mark's Baptist Church and Ashland Cemetery | St. Mark's Baptist Church and Ashland Cemetery | February 21, 2018 (#100002116) | 6025 Section Rd. 30°32′18″N 91°17′44″W | Port Allen | |
| 14 | Sandbar Plantation House | Sandbar Plantation House | September 2, 1999 (#99001039) | 4234 S. River Rd. 30°24′31″N 91°13′02″W | Port Allen | |
| 15 | Smithfield Plantation House | Smithfield Plantation House | April 7, 1995 (#95000387) | 12445 N. River Rd. 30°32′59″N 91°17′27″W | Port Allen | |
| 16 | Stone Square Lodge No. 8 | | April 7, 2022 (#100007604) | 1044 Michigan Ave. 30°27′32″N 91°12′47″W | Port Allen | |

== Former listing ==
| | Name on the Register | Image | Date listed | Date removed | Location | City or town | Description |
|---|---|---|---|---|---|---|---|
| 1 | Cohn High School | Cohn High School | June 22, 2004 (#04000638) | March 31, 2015 | 805 N. 14th St. 30°27′34″N 91°13′05″W | Port Allen | |

== See also ==
- List of National Historic Landmarks in Louisiana
- National Register of Historic Places listings in Louisiana
