= Cinclare Sugar Mill Historic District =

Sugar mill and plantation in Louisiana

- U.S. National Register of Historic Places
- U.S. Historic district
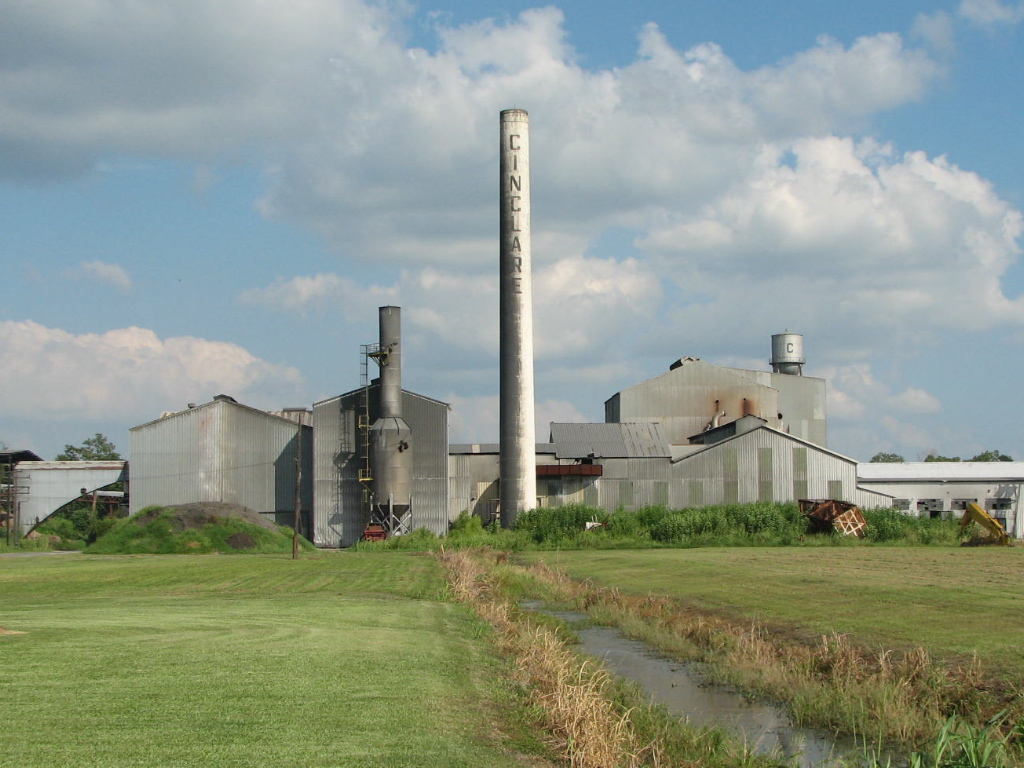
- The industrial side of the district in 2006

- Location within Louisiana Location within the United States
- Location: 5133 S Florence St, Port Allen, Louisiana 70767
- Nearest city: Brusly, Louisiana,
- Coordinates: 30°23′46″N 91°13′59″W
- Built: c. 1855 to the present
- Architectural style: Creole, Greek Revival, Kit houses, Vernacular
- Website: www.hllaws.com/cinclare
- NRHP reference No.: 98000394
- Added to NRHP: April 23, 1998

The Cinclare Sugar Mill Historic District is a historic industrial and residential complex on the former Marengo Plantation in unincorporated West Baton Rouge Parish, Louisiana. The district is located on the west bank of the Mississippi River between Brusly and Port Allen and across from Baton Rouge. It was listed on the National Register of Historic Places in 1998.

== Architecture ==
The historic district consists of 46 buildings and two structures. The manufacturing portion of the district contains both structures: a smokestack reading "CINCLARE" and a water tower. The National Park Service state the nineteenth-century plantation mule barn is the only known surviving building of its type, and is important at a state level. The sugar industry used to rely heavily on mules for power in mills, but similar structures were typically demolished after the introduction of tractors.

The complex also contained a company town for year-round employees. The oldest structures is a circa 1855 plantation house in the Greek Revival style. There is a nearby row of manager houses. There are also several worker cottages built in 1913, originally thought to be Sears Roebuck & Company kit houses, but are more likely kit houses from Aladdin Homes, as they list Cinclare Central Factory as one of the companies that bought industrial housing from them, in their 1918 catalog of Industrial Housing. Additionally, the house standing at 5114 N Florence Street, is an example of the Shadow Lawn model from Aladdin Homes, and was listed in a 1917 sales record as one of the purchases by Cinclare Central Factory. Earlier worker housing built in the traditional Creole cottage style, can also be found. A dormitory for seasonal works has since been demolished.

== History ==
In the Antebellum era, the Marengo Plantation was established from multiple parcels in 1855 as a forced-labor operation, and like most of the sugar plantations in the area, had its own mule-driven sugar kiln. After the Civil War John H. Laws from Cincinnati, Ohio bought the facility in 1878. He renamed it "Cinclare" and began to invest in expanding and automating the industrial facility at a time of consolidation in the sugar industry.

In the early twentieth century, the facility serviced a company town complete with company scrip and a plantation store. In 1914, Langdon Laws, who was also a director of the Texas and Pacific Railroad, had a spur line built to the mill. Seasonal workers would augment the year-round staff during the fall "cracking season".

In 2005, the Harry L. Laws & Company announced that the sugar mill would close but the company would continue to send sugar grown in West Baton Rouge Parish to the mill at the Alma Plantation in Pointe Coupee Parish. The company continues to own 13,000 acres of agricultural land, mostly devoted to sugarcane, throughout West Baton Rouge, Iberville and St. Martin parishes.

In 2013, the 210-foot-tall smokestack was repaired and repainted. It was originally built around 1950 for what was then named the Cinclare Central Factory. In 2018, the company won an award for restoring the vacation home of the Laws family that was built in 1906. The company continues to own the facility, rents out the housing, and is considering building a planned community. The West Baton Rouge Museum received donated machinery from Cinclare which it has incorporated into exhibits since it was the last sugar mill in the parish.

== See also ==
- List of plantations in Louisiana
- Laurel Valley Sugar Plantation
- Sugar industry of the United States
- National Register of Historic Places listings in West Baton Rouge Parish, Louisiana
