= Louisiana's 29th House of Representatives district =

American legislative district

Louisiana's 29th State House of Representatives district
Representative
Edmond Jordan; D–Baton Rouge

Louisiana's 29th House of Representatives district is one of 105 Louisiana House of Representatives districts. It is currently represented by Democrat Edmond Jordan of Baton Rouge.

== Geography ==
HD29 includes a significant part of the State capital of Baton Rouge, alongside its adjacent districts of 61, 67 and 101.

== Election results ==
Year	Winning candidate	Party	Percent	Opponent	Party	Percent
2011	Regina Barrow	Democratic	63.9%	Edmond Jordan	Democratic	36.1%
2015	Ronnie Edwards	Democratic	59.1%	Edmond Jordan	Democratic	40.9%
2016 - Special	Edmond Jordan	Democratic	59.6%	Veretta Lee	Democratic	40.4%
2019	Edmond Jordan	Democratic	100%			
2023	Edmond Jordan	Democratic	Cancelled			
