= Brusly High School =

Location
- 630 Frontage Road; Brusly, (West Baton Rouge Parish), Louisiana 70719; United States; 30.3930°N 91.2386°W

Information
- Established: 1911
- Principal: Walt Lemoine
- Teaching staff: 51.76 (on an FTE basis)
- Grades: 9–12
- Enrollment: 770 (2023–24)
- Student to teacher ratio: 14.88
- Colors: Scarlet, gold, and black
- Mascot: Panther
- Team name: Panthers

Brusly High School (BHS) is a high school (grades 9–12) in Brusly, Louisiana, United States. It is a part of the West Baton Rouge Parish School Board.

The school serves residents of Brusly, Addis, and unincorporated areas in southern parts of the parish. As of 2018 the school has over 600 students.

== Athletics ==
Brusly High athletics competes in the LHSAA.

== Notable alumni ==
- John Foster (2024), runner-up on American Idol.
- Randall Gay (2000), former NFL defensive back (New England Patriots)
- Edmond Jordan (1989), Louisiana state representative
- Norman LeJeune (1998), former NFL defensive back (Miami Dolphins)
- Walter Williams (1995), former NFL running back (New England Patriots)
