= Allendale Plantation =

- U.S. National Register of Historic Places
- U.S. Historic district
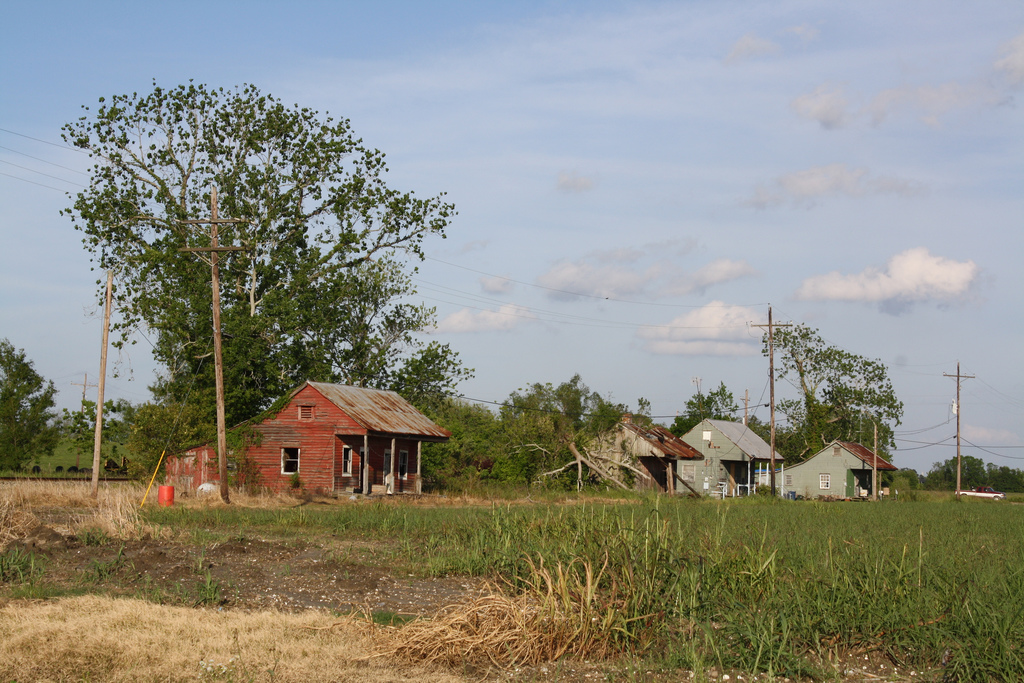
- Allendale Plantation (2012)

- Location within Louisiana Location within the United States
- Location: Port Allen, Louisiana, U.S.
- Coordinates: 30°29′45″N 91°16′24″W
- Area: 13 acres (5.3 ha)
- Built: c. 1855
- NRHP reference No.: 96001263
- Added to NRHP: November 1, 1996

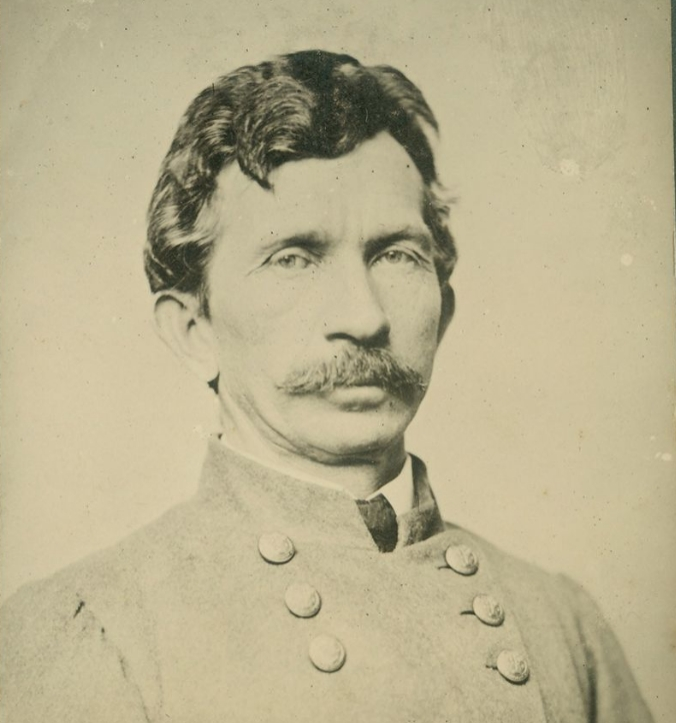
Henry Watkins Allen (between 1861 and 1865)

Allendale Plantation, also known as the Allendale Plantation Historic District, is a historic site and complex of buildings that was once a former sugar plantation founded c. 1855 and worked by enslaved African Americans (prior to the end of the American Civil War). It is located in Port Allen, West Baton Rouge Parish, Louisiana.

The site has been listed on the National Register of Historic Places since November 1, 1996, it is noted for its agricultural significance as an example of a Reconstruction-era sugar plantation system in southern Louisiana.

== History ==
In February 1852, Henry Watkins Allen and William Nolan purchased the Westover Plantation. Henry Watkins Allen had served as a brigadier general in the Confederate States Army during the American Civil War, as well as serving as the 17th Governor of Louisiana. Three years later in 1855, the land was divided and split; with Nolan keeping the name Westover Plantation on his portion of land and Allen using the name Allendale for his portion of the property.

=== Henry Watkins Allen (1855–1865) ===
The Allendale Plantation under Henry Watkins Allen grew to 2,027 acres (820 ha), with 627 acres (254 ha) farmed. Allen owned 125 enslaved African Americans. Allen built his own railroad, which had been headquartered in what is now the town of Port Allen.

During the American Civil War (1861–1865), parts of the Allendale Plantation had burned, including the Allendale Mill. Allen had moved to Mexico art the war in 1865, and a year later he died on April 22, 1866, in Mexico City, and as a result the Allendale Plantation held many owners after his death.

=== Kahao family (starting in 1882) ===
In 1882, the plantation was purchased by brothers John Kahao and Martin James Kahao, formerly from Kansas. The Kahao family bought up smaller neighboring plots of land, in order to grow the total land size. The Allendale Plantation records showed that after 1908, many of the laborers were still being paid in tokens and merchandise checks instead of cash, which went against Federal law changes. The Kahao family operated it as a sugar mill into the 1930s.

== Architecture ==
The Allendale Plantation Historic District is the name used by the National Register of Historic Places (NRHP), and it includes 15 wood-framed structures that were once part of the Allendale Plantation. Some 13 of the 15 structures were former residences on the property, as well as a church and an office building. The plantation manor house and the sugar mill have long since been destroyed. In January 1887, the nearby Westover Plantation's main residence had a fire and burned down by accident, when they were trying to use fire to clear nearby weeds.

Multiple cabins built between 1870 and 1900 are found on the site, they were once used by sharecropping laborers. The cabins were generally built as four-rooms that were occupied by a single family. The West Baton Rouge Museum has had one of the Allendale Plantation slave cabins onsite since 1976 (once owned by Allen, pre-1865) and the museum offers a narrative history. In 2016 and 2020, the West Baton Rouge Museum narrative tour featuring Allendale Plantation been criticized for being biased and narrow in scope.

The Allendale Church was built for laborers, and the office on the property held all of the related operations paperwork. Most of the plantation buildings were moved often, due to flooding of the area.

As of 1987, there were only six remaining examples of the sugar plantation complexes and systems in southern Louisiana.

== See also ==
- List of plantations in Louisiana
- Plantation complexes in the Southern United States
- Statue of Henry Watkins Allen
- National Register of Historic Places listings in West Baton Rouge Parish, Louisiana
