= Poplar Grove Plantation (Louisiana) =

- Poplar Grove Plantation House
- U.S. National Register of Historic Places
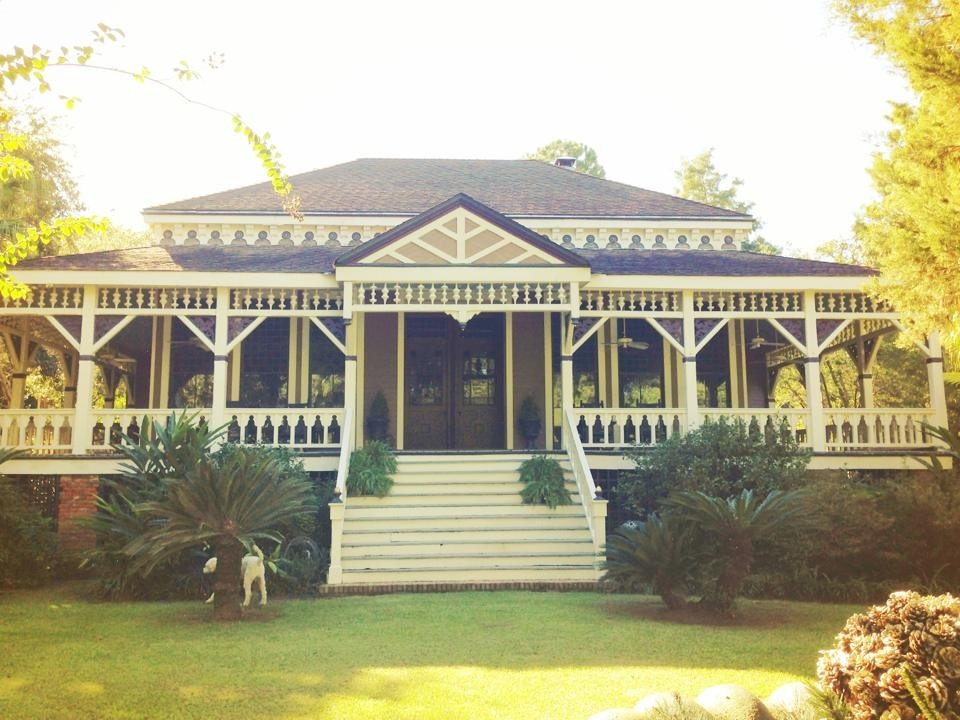

- Location within Louisiana
- Location: 3142 North River Road, Port Allen, Louisiana, 70767
- Coordinates: 30°29′36″N 91°12′10″W
- Architect: Thomas Sully
- NRHP reference No.: 87002136

The Poplar Grove Plantation, also once known as Popular Grove Plant and Refining Company, is a historic building, site and cemetery, the plantation is from the 1820s and the manor house was built in 1884, located in Port Allen in West Baton Rouge Parish, Louisiana, United States. The site served as a sugar plantation worked by enslaved African Americans, starting in the 1820s by James McCalop. Starting in 1903, the site was owned by the Wilkinson family for many generations.

The house has been on the list of National Register of Historic Places, since December 14, 1987, for its architectural importance.

== History ==
Poplar Grove was established in the 1820s by James McCalop, he came from North Carolina and had combining several smaller tracts of land. The site was originally 1,438 acres. McCalop had owned enslaved African Americans. On one side of this plantation was the Mulatto Bend community (along US Route 190), the home of blues musician Slim Harpo.

Joseph L. Harris acquired Poplar Grove Plantation in 1885. The Poplar Grove Plantation manor house was part of the Banker's Pavilion at the 1884 World's Industrial and Cotton Centennial Exposition held in Audubon Park, New Orleans. In 1886, the structure was purchased by Harris and moved by way of barge down the Mississippi River to Port Allen, Louisiana.

Horace Wilkinson, who managed the plantation for Harris had purchased it in 1903. Horace Wilkinson was a descent of General James Wilkinson. The earlier days of the plantation featured on the property a sugar mill, workers' quarter, a chapel, barns, corn crib, and a commissary store. The sugar mill at Poplar Grove, which produced raw sugar and molasses, was operated until 1973.

Once slavery was outlawed after 1865, sharecropping was common in the Southern United States during (and after) the Reconstruction era. In 2002, a cabin burned down on the property, it had previously been used for sharecropping.

Since 2010, the steam engine for the plantation is moved and now on display at the LSU Rural Life Museum.

=== Architecture ===
The plantation house structure was built by architect Thomas Sully, and is a single story, framed with a galleried porch. The floor plan has been modified from the original design. The architecture style features a combination of Chinese, Italianate, Eastlake, and Queen Anne Revival elements.

It is surrounded on three sides by a gallery porch with ornate decorations, including jigsaw cut Chinese dragons surrounding the top of the porch gallery, Eastlake abacus inspired spindles, and Queen Anne Revival style multi-pane windows and 60 stained glass windows. The structure had half-timbered gable at the entrance, and originally had two parlors. The roof has an elaborate Italianate modillion cornice.

== See also ==
- List of plantations in Louisiana
- National Register of Historic Places listings in West Baton Rouge Parish, Louisiana
