= Monte Vista Plantation House =

- U.S. National Register of Historic Places
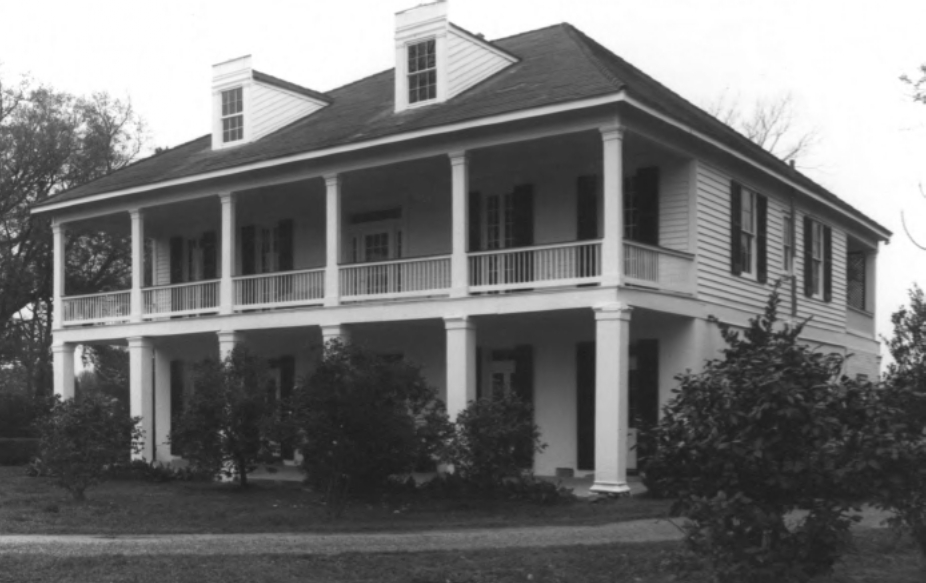

- Location within Louisiana
- Location: 3722 North River Road, Port Allen, Louisiana
- Nearest city: Port Allen, Louisiana
- Coordinates: 30°30′10″N 91°12′11″W
- Area: 0.9 acres (0.36 ha)
- Built: 1857–1859
- Architectural style: Greek Revival
- NRHP reference No.: 80001769
- Added to NRHP: June 9, 1980

The Monte Vista Plantation House is a historic mid-19th-century plantation house north of Port Allen, Louisiana, in West Baton Rouge Parish, Louisiana. It stands immediately behind the Mississippi River levee and, despite its urban location, retains a rural setting. The present structure was built between 1857 and 1859 by district judge Louis Favrot.

The property occupies land acquired in 1800 by Favrot’s father, who named it “Monte Vista.” The plantation later became associated with officer and commandant Pierre Joseph Favrot in the early 19th century. Monte Vista operated as a sugar plantation during the antebellum period, part of the wider sugar economy that characterized West Baton Rouge Parish before the American Civil War.

The Favrot family retained ownership until 1920, when the property was purchased by Horace Wilkinson Jr. Members of the Wilkinson family— including Horace Wilkinson Jr. and Horace Wilkinson III—served in the Louisiana Legislature and on the Louisiana State University Board of Supervisors. At the time of its nomination, the house was owned by Horace Wilkinson IV.

Monte Vista was listed on the National Register of Historic Places on June 9, 1980, for its architectural significance and its association with prominent Louisiana political families.

== Architecture ==
Monte Vista is a two-and-a-half-story, wood-frame residence with a clapboard exterior. It follows a central-hall, double-parlor plan with a central staircase. Both the front and rear façades feature five-bay, two-story galleries supported by square posts with molded capitals. Interior rooms open onto these galleries through paneled French doors topped with transoms. The main entrances on both levels contain transom and side lighted doors framed with aedicule style trim.

The house is topped by a broad hip roof with front and rear dormers. Much of the original glass, hardware, and flooring remain intact.
