= Statue of Henry Watkins Allen =

Statue in Port Allen, Louisiana, U.S.

- Artist: Angela Gregory
- Year: 1962; 64 years ago
- Subject: Henry Watkins Allen
- Location: Port Allen, Louisiana, U.S.; 30.459949°N 91.210237°W

A statue of Henry Watkins Allen (1962) by Angela Gregory is installed in Port Allen, Louisiana, United States. The memorial is slated for removal, as of July 2020.

== About ==
In July 2020, after the international social movement of Black Lives Matter (BLM) and protests, a Henry Watkins Allen statue in Port Allen, created by local artist Angela Gregory was under debate over its historical significance. One side of the debate is the sculpture may need more context for it to hold any significance, since Allen was a former Confederate States Army military leader, the owner of the Allendale Plantation, and he had owned enslaved African Americans. On the other side of the debate, Henry Watkins Allen shaped Louisiana history and some say he should have more representation, even beyond the one monument by Gregory.

Henry Watkins Allen's connection to the city of his namesake, Port Allen was his residence at the Allendale Plantation.

== See also ==
- List of monuments and memorials removed during the George Floyd protests
