= Smithfield Plantation (Fredericksburg, Virginia) =

Fredericksburg Country Club
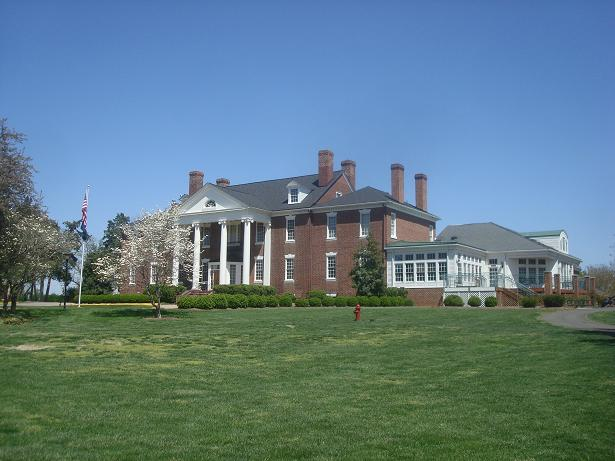
- Smithfield, now the clubhouse of Fredericksburg Country Club, in 2010

- Location within the United States Location within Virginia
- 38°15′53″N 77°25′37″W

Club information
- Location: Fredericksburg, Virginia, U.S.
- Established: 1925
- Type: Private
- Total holes: 18
- Website: www.fredclub.org

For the plantation in Port Allen, Louisiana, see Smithfield Plantation (Port Allen, Louisiana).

Smithfield Plantation, now known as Fredericksburg Country Club, is a historic former plantation house and estate in Spotsylvania County, Virginia, four miles south of the city of Fredericksburg. It has been a private country club since 1925.

== Early history ==
The land on which the Fredericksburg Country Club was established, is rich in both history and people. Prior to the arrival of the first white settlers, Native Americans of the Algonquin tribes hunted and fished on the grounds and waters bounding the Club property.

In 1671, Charles II of England granted about 5,000 acres to a Major Lawrence Smith of Gloucester County, Virginia. In 1676, the early settlers built a fort in the vicinity of the club's 10th tee, to protect themselves from these same Indians. After an abortive effort to establish a settlement here, Smith broke the grant into parcels, one of which was sold in 1730 to Francis Taliaferro. In the mid-eighteenth century the property was inherited by a relative in the then prominent Brooke family, who built a home thereon and named it Smithfield in honor of the original owner of the land.

Richard Brooke raised four sons who all fought in the War of Independence and later gained prominence in the new nation. Laurence Brooke, the eldest, sailed with our nation's first naval hero, John Paul Jones. Captain Jones, a citizen of Fredericksburg, appointed Laurence surgeon of the Bon Homme Richard and both participated in the famous engagement with the Serapis. After the Revolution Laurence became one of the most respected doctors of our new nation. Robert Brooke, the second son, was captured by the British and sent to England by Lord Howe. He escaped via Scotland and France, returned to Virginia, joined a volunteer troop of cavalry and was captured again at Westham, seven miles above Richmond. In 1794 Robert was elected Governor of Virginia, and later served as Attorney General for the state. Francis and John Brooke were twins and the youngest of the family. Both served as officers at the age of sixteen for Generals Lafayette, Harrison and Spotswood. John later served in the House of Delegates from Stafford for many years. Francis served in the House of Delegates until he became a Judge in 1804 and served until 1849.

The Smithfield property was purchased by John Pratt of Caroline County in 1814. Shortly thereafter, the original dwelling burned down, and by 1822 the present mansion house was built.

== The Battle of Fredericksburg ==
In December 1862, Union troops crossed the Rappahannock near what is now the Spotsylvania County Industrial Park, and marched down the Richmond Stage Road (now State Route 2) toward what is now the Country Club. From here, they were to make a right flank movement, and attack the Confederate forces on the high ground about a mile to the west of the club. A young Alabamian, Major John Pelham, CSA, in a daring and unorthodox move, brought a battery of artillery down from Hamilton's Crossing to a point near the intersection of what is now Tidewater Trail and Benchmark Road, just south of the clubhouse. The National Park Service has a marker in this location. From here he fired on the Union troops, resisting efforts of his senior officers to withdraw until his casualties were such that the battery was no longer effective.

During this same December, the present clubhouse became a Union hospital. With the Confederate artillery on the high ground to the west, and the Union artillery on the east bank of the river, cannonballs undoubtedly crossed the property concurrently from both directions. Many who fought over this ground, including Lee, Jackson, Longstreet, Burnside, Hooker, and Sumner, had a clear view of the mansion that is now the clubhouse.

The Pratt family retained ownership of the property up to the beginning of the 20th century.

== The Vance era ==
In 1905, Captain Reginald Henley Conroy Vance, of New York, purchased Smithfield and added the current wings and white columns to the house. These were the work of architects William Penn Cresson and Nathan C. Wyeth. Wyeth would later design the Oval Office at the White House for William Howard Taft. In 1907, Captain Vance purchased a portion of the adjoining Mannsfield estate and renamed the current clubhouse, Mannsfield Hall. The historic Mannsfield mansion, located on the current North Club subdivision, had burned to the ground January 1863, when southern troops mistakenly built their fire on a hardwood floor. Captain Vance and his wife Clarissa died in the collapse of the Knickerbocker Theater in Washington in 1922.

== Formation of the Country Club ==
In 1925, after Captain Vance's death, the property was purchased by a group of Fredericksburg area citizens, who incorporated it as the Mannsfield Hall Country Club. The dwelling that had been built in 1819 now became their clubhouse, and a nine-hole golf course, tennis courts, and a swimming pool were added. Mannsfield Hall soon became one of the social centers in the Fredericksburg area, and the host to many parties, weddings, balls, and meetings.

Unfortunately, with the advent of World War II, gasoline rationing, the shortage of supplies, and the departure of many young men and women to the military, circumstances required the corporation to be dissolved and the property sold at a public auction. It was purchased by Colonel Richard F. Riddell of Washington for $39,000. In 1946, after the war, a group of citizens, many of whom were former club stockholders, purchased the property again for $60,000, (~$733,801 in 2024) and incorporated under its present name, The Fredericksburg Country Club.

Since its repurchase, a host of changes and improvements have been made. In 1961, another nine holes were added to the course, several greens relocated, new bunkers built, approaches contoured, and extensive landscaping enhancements undertaken. Of historic note to golfers: The small pond to the right front of the 9th tee covers up what used to be the old 8th green. The original swim facility was replaced with an Olympic style pool, and a wading pool for the youngsters. The outdoor tennis courts were relocated and a new building, housing two indoor courts, was constructed.

The clubhouse itself has undergone several major changes. In 1973, a large ballroom and several ancillary facilities were added to the east side of the building. In 1988, further major modifications were made to include increasing the dining area, adding a new kitchen, locker rooms, showers and storage areas. In 1990, a new building was erected to house the golf carts and grounds maintenance equipment. A new pump house was installed in 1993, making it possible to double the amount of acreage that could be served by the water sprinkling system.

The Club underwent major construction changes in 1998, necessitated in part by the increase in membership, as well as adding new physical plant amenities. The former kitchen area was remodeled, and has become an employee lounge and storage area. The Rappahannock dining room was enlarged, and the former Hunt and Mannsfield rooms joined and remodeled for gourmet dining and small parties. Added construction provided space for a new bar and bar room; an enlarged new modern kitchen; and a Great Room under the new kitchen. This room provides space for youngsters to come in from the sun or rain, play or watch television, and to get a snack. This Great Room is also used for meetings, banquets, and is adjacent to an area built for al fresco dining. Improvements were made to enhance the play on an already fine golf course, and two new clay courts built for tennis playing members. A fully equipped new exercise room was also added during 1998.

== Looking ahead ==
Over 300 years after the first buildings were erected on the property; 190 years after the present clubhouse was built, 150 years after the last cannon was fired in anger across its boundaries; and 65 years after it was repurchased for $60,000, the Fredericksburg Country Club is now a family oriented, nonprofit social club. The golf, tennis and pool facilities are in fine condition and in active use. The original charm of the ca. 1822 mansion has been preserved, with later additions adapted to contemporary styles and customs. It is a place of luncheons, meetings, youth activities, parties, bridge, banquets, weddings, dances, dinners, and conversation. Its historic setting, architecture, grounds, and landscaping are amongst the finest in Virginia.

On August 23, 2011, a 5.8 magnitude earthquake hit the central Virginia region damaging the 4 main chimneys of the original plantation house. The Historic Smithfied-Brooke Foundation, Inc., a 501(c)3 charitable organization which had a mission to preserve the historic plantation structure, is currently raising funds to repair the earthquake damage.
