= Francis T. Brooke =

American judge (1763–1851)

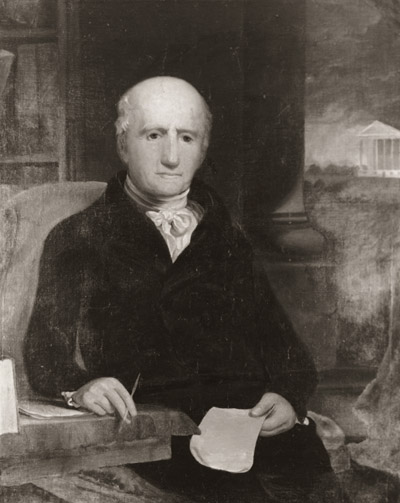

4th Chief Justice of Virginia
- In office 1823 – March 3, 1851
- Preceded by: William Fleming
- Succeeded by: Henry St. George Tucker, Sr.

Justice of the Virginia Supreme Court
- In office March 4, 1811 – March 3, 1851

Member of the Virginia House of Delegates from the Essex County district
- In office November 11, 1794 – November 8, 1796
- Preceded by: George Williams Smith
- Succeeded by: Humphrey B. Brooke

Member of the Virginia Senate from the Spotsylvania, Culpeper, Madison and Orange Counties district
- In office July 3, 1799 – December 3, 1804
- Preceded by: French Strother
- Succeeded by: Robert Taylor

Personal details
- Born: August 27, 1763 Spotsylvania County, Virginia
- Died: March 3, 1851 (aged 87) Spotsylvania County, Virginia
- Spouse(s): Mary Randolph Spotswood, Mary Champe Carter
- Relatives: Robert Brooke (brother); Dabney Herndon Maury (cousin)
- Profession: Lawyer, soldier, politician, judge

Military service
- Allegiance: United States of America; Virginia
- Branch/service: Virginia Militia
- Years of service: 1776-1810
- Rank: lieutenant, major, colonel, brigadier general
- Battles/wars: American Revolutionary War

Francis Taliaferro Brooke (August 27, 1763 – March 3, 1851) was a Virginia lawyer, soldier, politician and judge. He served in both houses of the Virginia General Assembly before fellow legislators elected him to the Virginia Supreme Court of Appeals (which later became the Supreme Court of Virginia), where he served decades and became that body's fourth President (later called Chief Justice).

== Early life and education ==
Brooke was born in Spotsylvania County, Virginia. His parents were Richard Brooke of Smithfield and Ann Hay Taliaferro (of one of the First Families of Virginia). They were the uncle and aunt of Major General Dabney Herndon Maury. His elder brother Robert Brooke would become governor of Virginia, and another brother, Lawrence Brooke, was the surgeon of the Bon Homme Richard, commanded by John Paul Jones. Like his brothers, Brooke received a private education from tutors and in private grammar schools in Fredericksburg.

During the American Revolution Brooke was active in the militia and served on General Greene's staff with the rank of lieutenant. At the end of the war he studied medicine for a year, but then decided to study law in his brother Robert’s office. Francis T. Brooke was a member of the Society of the Cincinnati of the State of Virginia.

== Career ==
After admission to the bar in 1788, Brooke traveled westward to the Ohio River and practiced in Monongalia and Harrison counties (in what after the American Civil War would become West Virginia). However, Brooke returned to the Chesapeake bay area and was elected Commonwealth’s Attorney (prosecutor) for Essex County, Virginia, where he also had a private legal practice and would be was elected to the House of Delegates in 1794. Two years later he moved nearer his family's home in Fredericksburg and won election to the State Senate in 1800.

In 1811, fellow legislators elected Brooke a judge of the Supreme Court of Appeals, his fellow judges made his president of that court for eight years, from 1823 to 1831. The legislature re-elected Brooke as judge in 1831, and he continued in office until his death on March 3, 1851.

== Personal life and death ==
Brooke married twice, and survived his eldest son, who died in Macau. In 1791, Francis Brooke married Mary Randolph Spottswood Brooke (1775–1803) and had at least children.
