= Walls, Louisiana =

- Unincorporated community
- Location within Louisiana Location within the United States
- Coordinates: 30°35′14″N 91°19′34″W
- Country: United States
- State: Louisiana
- Parish: West Baton Rouge
- Elevation: 26 ft (7.9 m)
- Time zone: UTC-6 (Central (CST))
  - Summer (DST): UTC-5 (CDT)
- Area code: 225
- GNIS feature ID: 543769

Walls is an unincorporated community in West Baton Rouge Parish, Louisiana, United States.
