= Devalls, Louisiana =

DeValls
- Unincorporated community
- Location of DeValls in Louisiana
- Coordinates: 30°31′35″N 91°17′43″W
- Country: United States
- State: Louisiana
- Parish: West Baton
- Elevation: 30 ft (9.1 m)

Population (2007)
  - Total: 900
- Time zone: UTC-6 (CST)
  - Summer (DST): UTC-5 (CDT)
- ZIP code: 70767
- Area code: 225
- GNIS feature ID: 543338

DeValls (also known as Devalls, DeVall, or Devall) is an unincorporated community in the 5th Ward of West Baton Rouge Parish, Louisiana, United States. DeValls is located approximately 20 miles northwest of Baton Rouge, and is a part of the Baton Rouge metropolitan area. The community is situated along the Mississippi River in northeastern West Baton Rouge. The community is served by Louisiana Highway 415, known locally as the River Road. Devall Middle School is nearby.
