= West Baton Rouge Parish School Board =

School district in Louisiana, United States

Coordinates: 30.4766°N 91.3021°W

West Baton Rouge Parish School Board is a school district headquartered in unincorporated West Baton Rouge Parish, Louisiana, United States. The district serves West Baton Rouge Parish.

== School uniforms ==
On March 17, 1999 the school board established a new rule requiring all students to wear school uniforms, taking into effect in the 2000-2001 school year.

== Schools ==
=== High schools ===
- Brusly High School (Brusly)
- Port Allen High School (Port Allen)

=== Middle schools ===
5-8

- Port Allen Middle School (Port Allen)

6-8

- Brusly Middle School (Brusly)

=== K-8 ===
- Caneview K-8 School

=== Elementary schools ===
4-5

- Brusly Upper Elementary (Brusly)

2-3

- Lukeville Upper Elementary School (Brusly)

2-4

- Cohn Elementary School (Port Allen)

PreK-3

- Chamberlin Elementary School (Port Allen; replaced by Cohn Elementary)

PreK-2

- Brusly Elementary School (Brusly)

PreK-1

- Port Allen Elementary School (Port Allen)
