= Double Exposure: The Story of Margaret Bourke-White =

- Genre: Biography; Drama
- Written by: Vicki Goldberg; Marjorie David
- Directed by: Lawrence Schiller
- Starring: Farrah Fawcett; Frederic Forrest
- Music by: John Cacavas
- Country of origin: United States
- Original language: English

Production
- Producer: Lawrence Schiller
- Production locations: Laurel Valley, Thibodaux, Louisiana
- Cinematography: Robert Elswit
- Editor: Don Brochu
- Running time: 91 minutes
- Production company: Turner Network Television

Original release
- Network: TNT
- Release: April 24, 1989

Double Exposure: The Story of Margaret Bourke-White is a 1989 made-for-television film biography about the life of photographer Margaret Bourke-White. The movie stars Farrah Fawcett as Bourke-White, Frederic Forrest, David Huddleston, Jay Patterson, Mitch Ryan. Portions of the movie were filmed in Lafourche Parish, Louisiana, at Laurel Valley Sugar Plantation. Army ROTC members from Nicholls State University served as extras in the film.

== Actors ==
- Farrah Fawcett as Margaret Bourke-White
- Frederic Forrest as Erskine Caldwell
- David Huddleston as Bemis
- Jay Patterson as Henry Luce
- Mitchell Ryan as Patton
- Robert Stanton as Lloyd-Smith
- Ken Marshall as Chappie
