= Amie Comeaux =

American singer-songwriter (1976-1997)

- A promotional image of Comeaux, circa 1995

Background information
- Born: Amie Noelle Comeaux; December 4, 1976; Brusly, Louisiana, U.S.
- Origin: Nashville, Tennessee, U.S.
- Died: December 21, 1997 (aged 21); Lacombe, Louisiana, U.S.
- Genres: Country
- Occupations: Singer; songwriter
- Instrument: Vocals
- Years active: 1984–1997
- Label: Polydor Nashville

Amie Noelle Comeaux (/ˈkoʊmoʊ/; December 4, 1976 – December 21, 1997) was an American country music singer and songwriter who gained fame in her teens. Her debut studio album, Moving Out, was released on Polydor Records in 1994, and it produced the single "Who's She to You", a No. 64 on the Billboard country charts. Two posthumous albums, A Very Special Angel and Memories Left Behind, were issued in 1998 and 2007, respectively.

== Early life ==
Comeaux first began singing at nursing homes and weddings as a child. When she was nine years old, she sang the Star-Spangled Banner at a New Orleans Saints game in the Louisiana Superdome, and continued to do so throughout her teenage years. Comeaux was also chosen to play the lead role in Annie at the Baton Rouge Little Theater.

== Career ==
Record producer Harold Shedd had been working with Comeaux since she was ten years old, helping her with her singing skills.

In 1993, she was signed to Polydor Records label. A year later, her debut album Moving Out was released; however, Polydor closed its doors soon afterward, and Comeaux was left without a record deal. Toby Keith, who was also on Polydor at the time, had offered to help with Comeaux's second album before the label's closure.

== Death ==
On December 21, 1997, Comeaux was returning home with her grandmother and her godchild, Megan, from a Christmas family gathering in Alabama. As Comeaux passed a car, her own automobile hydroplaned due to heavy rain and struck a tree. She was killed instantly. Comeaux's grandmother and godchild were injured in the crash and were hospitalized for some time, but both survived. She was buried in Grace Memorial Park Cemetery in Plaquemine, Louisiana.

Comeaux's posthumous album A Very Special Angel was released March 6, 1998, by Rival Records of Nashville, Tennessee, but due to printing errors, the album had to be repackaged and was re-released 20 days later. Comeaux had co-written some of the songs on the album. A second posthumous album, Memories Left Behind, was released in 2007. This album was dedicated to Comeaux's mother, who died in August 2006.

== Discography ==
=== Albums ===
Title	Album details
Moving Out	Release date: October 18, 1994; Label: Polydor Nashville
A Very Special Angel	Release date: June 30, 1998; Label: Contraband
Memories Left Behind	Release date: October 24, 2006; Label: Beaujo Music

=== Singles ===
Year	Single	Peak chart positions		Album
Year	Single	US Country	CAN Country	Album
1994	"Moving Out"	—	—	Moving Out
1994	"Who's She to You"	64	58	Moving Out
1995	"Blue"	—	—	Moving Out
"—" denotes releases that did not chart

=== Music videos ===
Year	Video
1994	"Moving Out"
1994	"Who's She to You"
