= Addis, Louisiana =

- Town
- Flag

- Location of Addis in West Baton Rouge Parish, Louisiana.

- Location of Louisiana in the United States
- Coordinates: 30°22′15″N 91°15′43″W
- Country: United States
- State: Louisiana
- Parish: West Baton Rouge
- Incorporated: 1915

Area
  - Total: 4.21 sq mi (10.91 km^{2})
  - Land: 4.20 sq mi (10.89 km^{2})
  - Water: 0.0077 sq mi (0.02 km^{2})
- Elevation: 13 ft (4.0 m)

Population (2020)
  - Total: 6,731
  - Density: 1,601.2/sq mi (618.24/km^{2})
- Time zone: UTC-6 (CST)
  - Summer (DST): UTC-5 (CDT)
- Area code: 225
- FIPS code: 22-00415
- GNIS feature ID: 2405122
- Website: www.addisla.org

Addis is a town in West Baton Rouge Parish, Louisiana, United States. The population was 6,731 at the 2020 census. It is part of the Baton Rouge Metropolitan Statistical Area.

== History ==
Founded in 1881 or 1882, Addis was originally known Baton Rouge Junction; the community was created as a division point for the Texas and Pacific Railroad. Circa 1909, local citizens renamed the village to Addis to honor J. W. Addis, the railroad official who had convinced the railroad to build a depot, hotel, and other facilities there in 1904.

The Bank of Addis building, listed on the National Register of Historic Places, is located in the town and is now the Addis Museum.

== Geography ==
According to the United States Census Bureau, the town has a total area of 1.8 square miles (4.7 km^{2}), all land.

Addis has a Köppen climate classification of Cfa, which means that Addis has mild temperatures, is fully humid, and a hot summer.

== Demographics ==
Historical population
Census	Pop.	Note	%±
1920	473		—
1930	425		−10.1%
1940	492		15.8%
1950	505		2.6%
1960	590		16.8%
1970	724		22.7%
1980	1,320		82.3%
1990	1,222		−7.4%
2000	2,238		83.1%
2010	3,593		60.5%
2020	6,731		87.3%
2025 (est.)	7,679	▲	14.1%
U.S. Decennial Census

Addis racial composition as of 2020
Race	Number	Percentage
White (non-Hispanic)	3,424	50.87%
Black or African American (non-Hispanic)	2,670	39.67%
Native American	9	0.13%
Asian	106	1.57%
Pacific Islander	2	0.03%
Other/Mixed	248	3.68%
Hispanic or Latino	272	4.04%

As of the 2020 United States census, there were 6,731 people, 1,694 households, and 1,353 families residing in the town. The population density was 1,601.1 inhabitants per square mile in 2020, compared to 854.7 inhabitants per square mile in 2010.

The ancestry of Addis in 2021 was, 9.2% French, 6.1% German, 4.9% English, 1.5% Italian, 1.4% Irish, 0.4% Scottish, 0.3% Polish.

28.9% of the population were under 18, and 10.2% were under 5. People over 65 made up 7.2% of the population, with 5.6% from 65 to 74, 1.6% from 75 to 84, and 0.0% over 85. The gender makeup of the city was 53.9% female, and 46.1% male.

The median household income was $81,681, families had a median household income of $95,694, married couples had $122,250, and non-families had $49,196. 8.3% of the population were under the poverty line, with 12.0% of people under 18 being in poverty, 7.2% of people 18 to 64 were in poverty, and 4.3% of people over 65 were in poverty.

== Education ==
West Baton Rouge Parish School Board operates public schools.

Residents are zoned to Brusly High School.

== See also ==
- List of municipalities in Louisiana
