= Antonia (Port Allen, Louisiana) =

Historic house in Louisiana, United States

- U.S. National Register of Historic Places
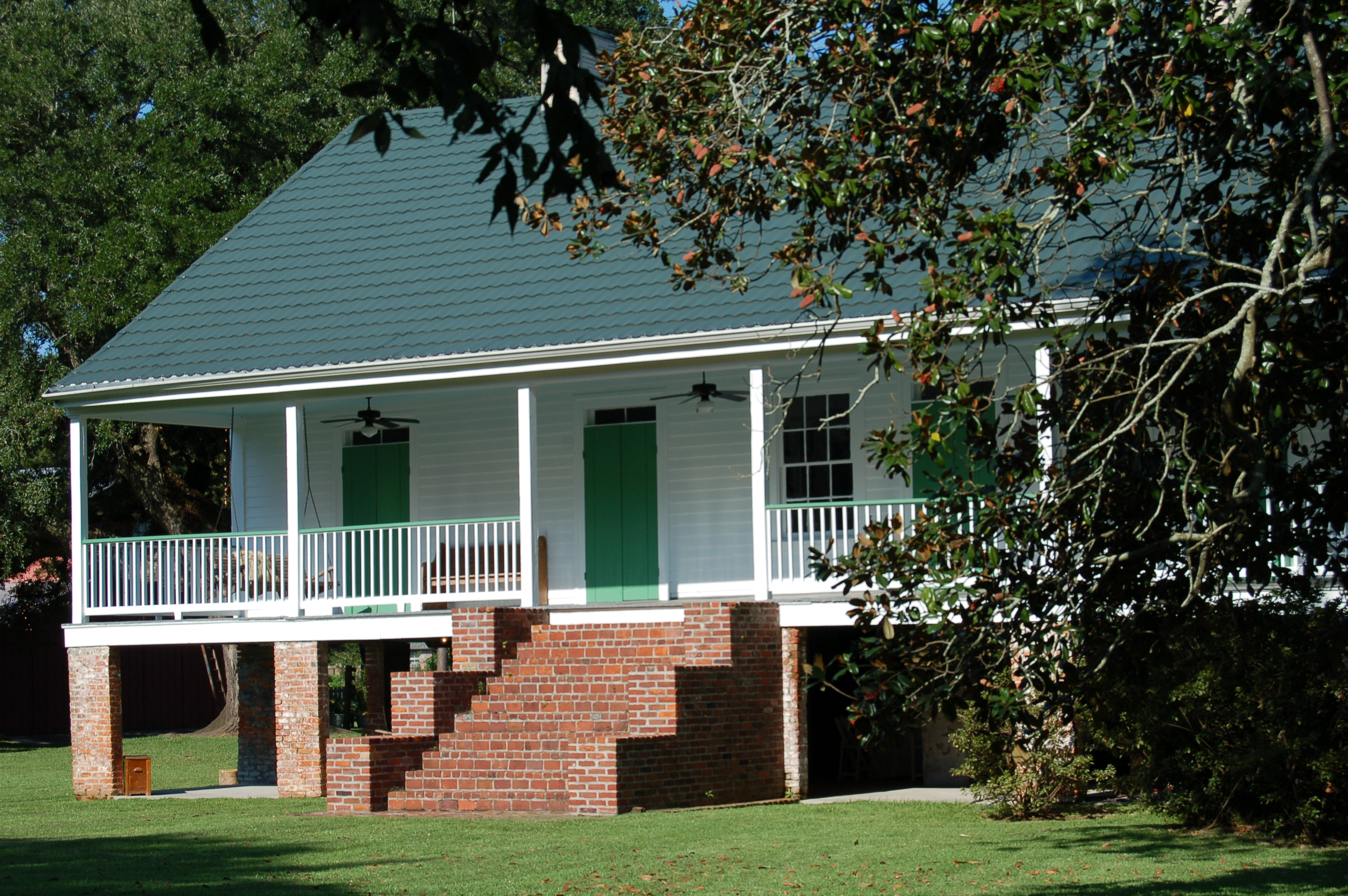
- Antonia in 2014

- Location within Louisiana Location within the United States
- Nearest city: Port Allen, Louisiana
- Coordinates: 30°24′19″N 91°13′12″W
- Area: 3 acres (1.2 ha)
- Built: 1811
- Architectural style: French Creole
- MPS: Louisiana's French Creole Architecture MPS
- NRHP reference No.: 08000743
- Added to NRHP: August 1, 2008

Antonia is a historic plantation in Port Allen, Louisiana, U.S.

== History ==
The land was granted to Pierre Lebert in 1793. It was inherited by his daughter, who married Zephirin Blanchard. Zephirin Blanchard married Lebert's daughter Elsie and expanded the plantation. The house was built c. 1811. Meanwhile, Zephirin Blanchard served in the War of 1812. His son, Arthur Zephirin, subsequently served in the American Civil War of 1861–1865. The plantation still belonged to his descendants in 2008.

== Architectural significance ==
The house has been listed on the National Register of Historic Places since August 1, 2008.
