= Laurel Valley Sugar Plantation =

Historic plantation in Louisiana, United States

- U.S. National Register of Historic Places
- U.S. Historic district
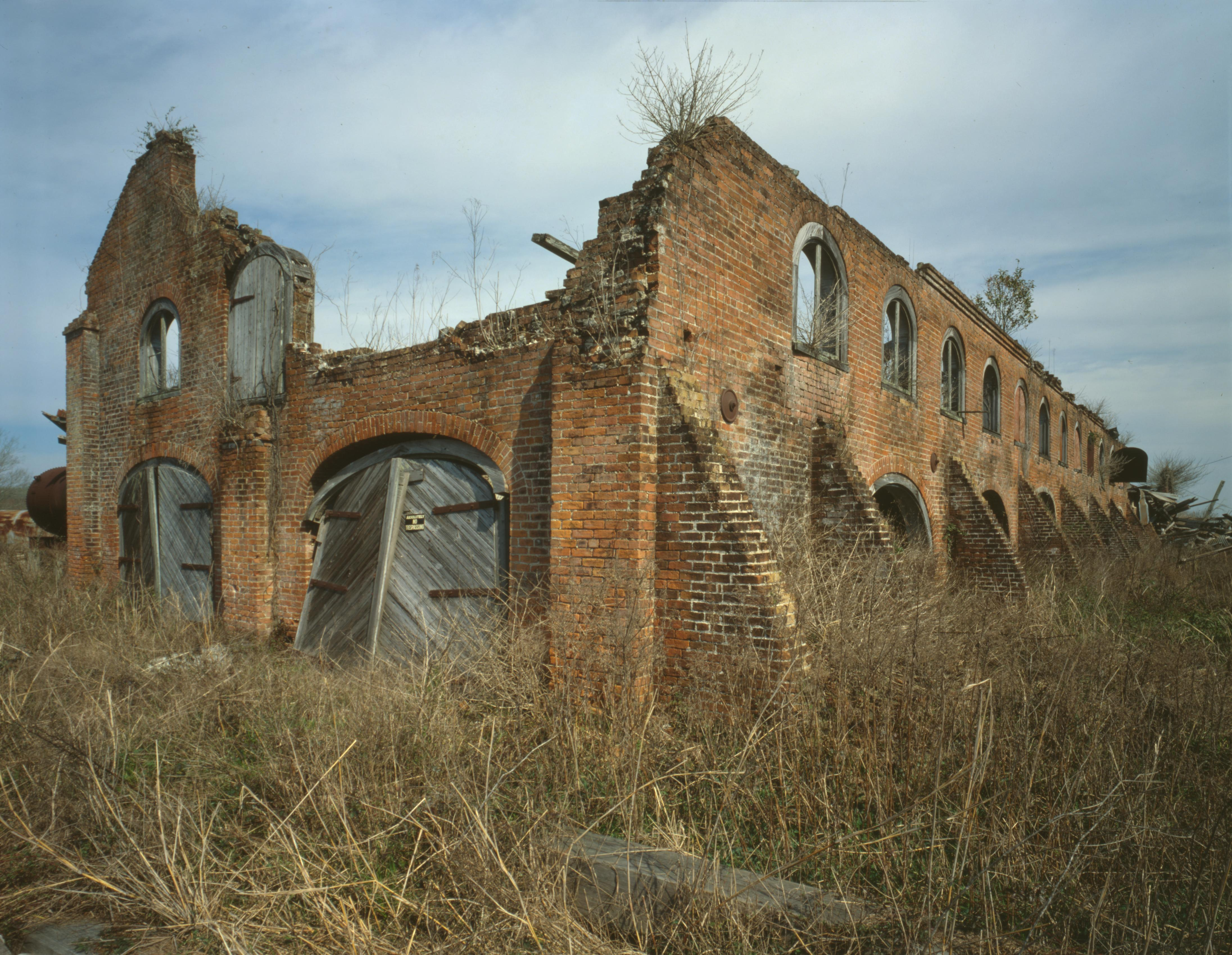
- Ruined mill at the plantation

- Location within Louisiana Location within the United States
- Location: Along Laurel Valley Road, about 2.3 miles (3.7 km) east of Thibodaux
- Nearest city: Thibodaux, Louisiana
- Coordinates: 29°48′04″N 90°46′45″W
- Area: 1,230 acres (500 ha)
- Built: 1850
- Architectural style: American Renaissance, Queen Anne Revival
- NRHP reference No.: 78001426
- Added to NRHP: March 24, 1978

Laurel Valley Sugar Plantation is located in Thibodaux, Louisiana. It is listed on the National Register of Historic Places.

== History ==
The plantation was originally owned by a French Acadian named Etienne Boudreaux. He was one of thousands of petit habitants who made their way to southern Louisiana after being expelled from Nova Scotia. Boudreaux bought a Spanish land grant about two miles south of Thibodaux along Bayou Lafourche in 1785.

Not much is known about the Boudreaux family, but the 1810 census lists 13 people living at the residence, nine males and four females. The Boudreaux family home, built in 1816, is the oldest surviving structure on property.

The property that came to be known as Laurel Valley Plantation was sold to Joseph W. Tucker in 1832. Tucker was a Virginian who bought about 5,000 acres of land along Bayou Lafourche. It was at one time the largest producer of sugar in Lafourche Parish, and a mill was built on the property for this purpose.

As many as 135 slaves lived and worked on the property prior to the Civil War. While the main house built by Tucker was burned by Union soldiers during the Civil War, shotgun houses (built circa 1895) and Creole cabins (built circa 1845) remain on the property. The mill stopped production in 1926, and sustained significant damage during Hurricane Betsy in 1965. In 2021, the plantation sustained extensive damage during Hurricane Ida and lost more than a dozen of the original buildings. However, Laurel Valley was able to reopen again a month later and currently offers guided tours of the property.

== Laurel Valley today ==
With about 40 original structures remaining, it is the largest surviving 19th- and 20th-century sugar plantation complex left in the United States, and it is still a working sugarcane farm. The general store on the property is open to the public, displaying tools and farm implements used in the cultivation of sugar cane as well as locally made arts and crafts. The store was not originally at the plantation; it had to be moved there.

Laurel Valley Plantation was added as a historic district to the National Register of Historic Places on March 24, 1978.

== Contributing properties ==
The historic 1,230 acres (500 ha) district comprises about 80 buildings and structures dating from c.1850 to c.1910:

=== Along LA 308 ===
- Plantation Church, also known as Old Fountain Missionary Baptist Church, 29°47′11″N 90°47′01″W, comprises the adjacent cemetery.
- Double Creole House No. 1, 29°47′15″N 90°47′04″W, built c.1890.
- Double Creole House No. 2, 29°47′21″N 90°47′11″W, built c.1890.
- Plantation store, 29°47′24″N 90°47′12″W, built c.1890.
- Double Creole House No. 3, 29°47′25″N 90°47′13″W, built c.1890.
- Creole House No. 1, 29°47′25″N 90°47′14″W, built c.1900.
- Creole House No. 2, 29°47′26″N 90°47′15″W, built c.1910.
- Shotgun House No. 1, 29°47′27″N 90°47′14″W, built c.1890.

=== Main house complex ===
- Plantation House, 29°48′33″N 90°46′16″W, built c.1880.
- Servants' Quarters, 29°48′32″N 90°46′16″W, built c.1880.

=== Single family Creole houses area ===
- Double Creole House No. 4, 29°48′37″N 90°46′19″W. No more standing.
- School House, 29°48′38″N 90°46′19″W. No more standing.
- Shotgun House No. 2, 29°48′41″N 90°46′17″W, built c.1910.
- Creole House No. 3, 29°48′43″N 90°46′16″W, built c.1880.
- Creole House No. 4, 29°48′44″N 90°46′15″W, built c.1880.
- Creole House No. 5, 29°48′45″N 90°46′14″W, built c.1880.
- Creole House No. 6, 29°48′46″N 90°46′13″W, built c.1880.
- Creole House No. 7, 29°48′47″N 90°46′13″W, built c.1880.
- Telephone Booth, 29°48′48″N 90°46′13″W. No more standing.
- Weighing Station, 29°48′47″N 90°46′11″W, built c.1910.
- Plantation Foreman House, 29°48′46″N 90°46′09″W, built c.1900.

=== Creole double houses area ===
- Watchman/Overseer's House, 29°48′40″N 90°46′22″W, built c.1900.
- Double Creole Tenant House No. 1, 29°48′41″N 90°46′21″W, built c.1880.
- Double Creole Tenant House No. 2, 29°48′41″N 90°46′21″W, built c.1880.
- Double Creole Tenant House No. 3, 29°48′42″N 90°46′20″W, built c.1880.
- Double Creole Tenant House No. 4, 29°48′42″N 90°46′20″W, built c.1880.
- Double Creole Tenant House No. 5, 29°48′43″N 90°46′19″W, built c.1880.
- Double Creole Tenant House No. 6, 29°48′44″N 90°46′19″W, built c.1880.
- Double Creole Tenant House No. 7, 29°48′44″N 90°46′18″W, built c.1880.
- Double Creole Tenant House No. 8, 29°48′45″N 90°46′18″W, built c.1880.
- Double Creole Tenant House No. 9, 29°48′45″N 90°46′17″W, built c.1880.
- Double Creole Tenant House No. 10, 29°48′46″N 90°46′17″W, built c.1880.
- Creole Tenant House No. 1, 29°48′47″N 90°46′16″W, built c.1880.
- Office/Carriage House, 29°48′47″N 90°46′16″W, built c.1880.
- Shop, 29°48′47″N 90°46′15″W, built c.1880.

=== Production complex and shotgun houses ===
- Single Tenant House No. 1, 29°48′42″N 90°46′24″W, built c.1884.
- Single Tenant House No. 2, 29°48′42″N 90°46′24″W, built c.1884.
- Single Tenant House No. 3, 29°48′43″N 90°46′24″W, built c.1884.
- Single Tenant House No. 4, 29°48′44″N 90°46′23″W, built c.1884.
- Single Tenant House No. 5, 29°48′48″N 90°46′20″W, built c.1884.
- Single Tenant House No. 6, 29°48′48″N 90°46′19″W, built c.1884.
- Multiple Tenant House/Storage Shed, 29°48′42″N 90°46′21″W, built c.1900. No more standing.
- Single Tenant Shotgun House No. 1, 29°48′43″N 90°46′22″W, built c.1900.
- Single Tenant Shotgun House No. 2, 29°48′43″N 90°46′20″W, built c.1900.
- Single Tenant Shotgun House No. 3, 29°48′44″N 90°46′21″W, built c.1900.
- Single Tenant Shotgun House No. 4, 29°48′44″N 90°46′22″W, built c.1900.
- Single Tenant Shotgun House No. 5, 29°48′45″N 90°46′23″W, built c.1900.
- Single Tenant Shotgun House No. 6, 29°48′45″N 90°46′24″W, built c.1900.
- Single Tenant Shotgun House No. 7, 29°48′46″N 90°46′25″W, built c.1900.
- Single Tenant Shotgun House No. 8, 29°48′44″N 90°46′20″W, built c.1900.
- Single Tenant Shotgun House No. 9, 29°48′44″N 90°46′21″W, built c.1900.
- Single Tenant Shotgun House No. 10, 29°48′45″N 90°46′21″W, built c.1900.
- Single Tenant Shotgun House No. 11, 29°48′45″N 90°46′22″W, built c.1900.
- Single Tenant Shotgun House No. 12, 29°48′46″N 90°46′23″W, built c.1900.
- Single Tenant Shotgun House No. 13, 29°48′47″N 90°46′24″W, built c.1900.
- Single Tenant Shotgun House No. 14, 29°48′45″N 90°46′19″W, built c.1900.
- Single Tenant Shotgun House No. 15, 29°48′45″N 90°46′20″W, built c.1900.
- Single Tenant Shotgun House No. 16, 29°48′46″N 90°46′21″W, built c.1900.
- Single Tenant Shotgun House No. 17, 29°48′46″N 90°46′22″W, built c.1900.
- Single Tenant Shotgun House No. 18, 29°48′47″N 90°46′23″W, built c.1900.
- Single Tenant Shotgun House No. 19, 29°48′47″N 90°46′24″W, built c.1900.
- Single Tenant Shotgun House No. 20, 29°48′46″N 90°46′19″W, built c.1900.
- Single Tenant Shotgun House No. 21, 29°48′46″N 90°46′20″W, built c.1900.
- Single Tenant Shotgun House No. 22, 29°48′47″N 90°46′21″W, built c.1900.
- Single Tenant Shotgun House No. 23, 29°48′48″N 90°46′22″W, built c.1900.
- Single Tenant Shotgun House No. 24, 29°48′48″N 90°46′23″W, built c.1900.
- Single Tenant Shotgun House No. 25, 29°48′49″N 90°46′21″W, built c.1900.
- Loading Crane, 29°48′48″N 90°46′15″W.
- Sugar Mill, 29°48′49″N 90°46′17″W, built c.1850.
- Exhaust Stack, 29°48′51″N 90°46′16″W, built c.1850.
- Boarding House, 29°48′50″N 90°46′17″W, built c.1900.
- Grinding Mill Pump Station, 29°48′53″N 90°46′17″W.
- Corn Shed Barn, 29°48′53″N 90°46′15″W, built c.1880.
- Shed, 29°48′53″N 90°46′15″W.
- Pump House, 29°48′50″N 90°46′13″W.
- Creole Tenant House No. 2, 29°48′49″N 90°46′12″W, built c.1890.
- Weigh Station, 29°48′49″N 90°46′12″W, built c.1890.

== Popular culture ==
Several movies have been filmed at Laurel Valley, including Angel Heart, Crazy in Alabama, A Gathering of Old Men, Interview with the Vampire, A Lesson Before Dying, Double Exposure: The Story of Margaret Bourke-White, and Ray.The Depeche Mode Music Video "Freelove" was also filmed on the plantation.

The history of the Laurel Valley Plantation was told in an episode of "Mysteries of the Abandoned" (S06E02).

== See also ==
- Thibodaux massacre
- Cinclare Sugar Mill Historic District
- National Register of Historic Places listings in Lafourche Parish, Louisiana
