= Bank of Addis =

- Bank Of Addis
- U.S. National Register of Historic Places
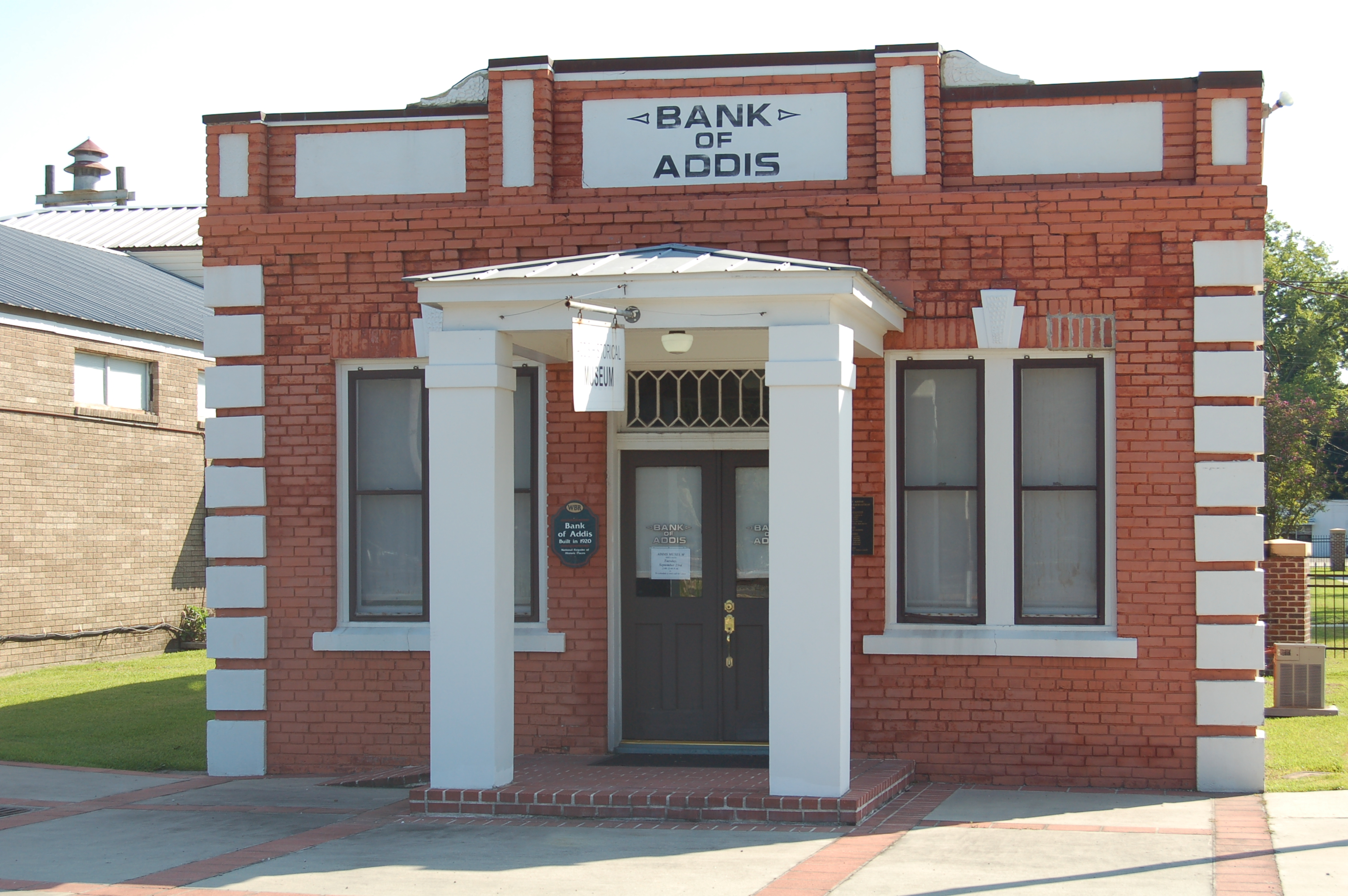
- Bank of Addis

- Location within Louisiana Location within the United States
- Location: 7843 Ray Rivet Street, Addis, Louisiana, U.S.
- Coordinates: 30°21′16″N 91°15′59″W
- Area: less than one acre
- Built: 1920
- NRHP reference No.: 92000038
- Added to NRHP: February 13, 1992

The Bank of Addis building, a former bank that is now home to the Addis Museum, is a historic building in Addis, Louisiana.

== History ==
The bank was chartered in 1919 and built in 1920. It was a part of a thriving small town business area that had grow up around a division point for the Texas and Pacific Railroad. The building operated as the Bank of Addis until 1925 when the bank charter was amended to become the Port Allen Bank and Trust Company; the building then served as its Addis Branch. The branch closed around 1930. The building was vacant until 1936 when it was converted into a post office.

A grocery store was added to the post office and both operated until 1981. The Town of Addis purchased the building in 1984 and converted it into a community museum. It was added to the National Register of Historic Places in 1992.

== Architecture ==
The bank is a small one story brick building. The exterior features an entrance porch with two large pillars, a corbelled brick cornice, and a stepped parapet with cast concrete panels. The building faces the railroad tracks, and is the only surviving part of the former business district.

In 1992, only the bank vault remained from the bank's historic period.

== See also ==
- West Baton Rouge Museum
- National Register of Historic Places listings in West Baton Rouge Parish, Louisiana
