= Smithfield Plantation (Port Allen, Louisiana) =

Historic house in Louisiana, United States

- Smithfield Plantation House
- U.S. National Register of Historic Places
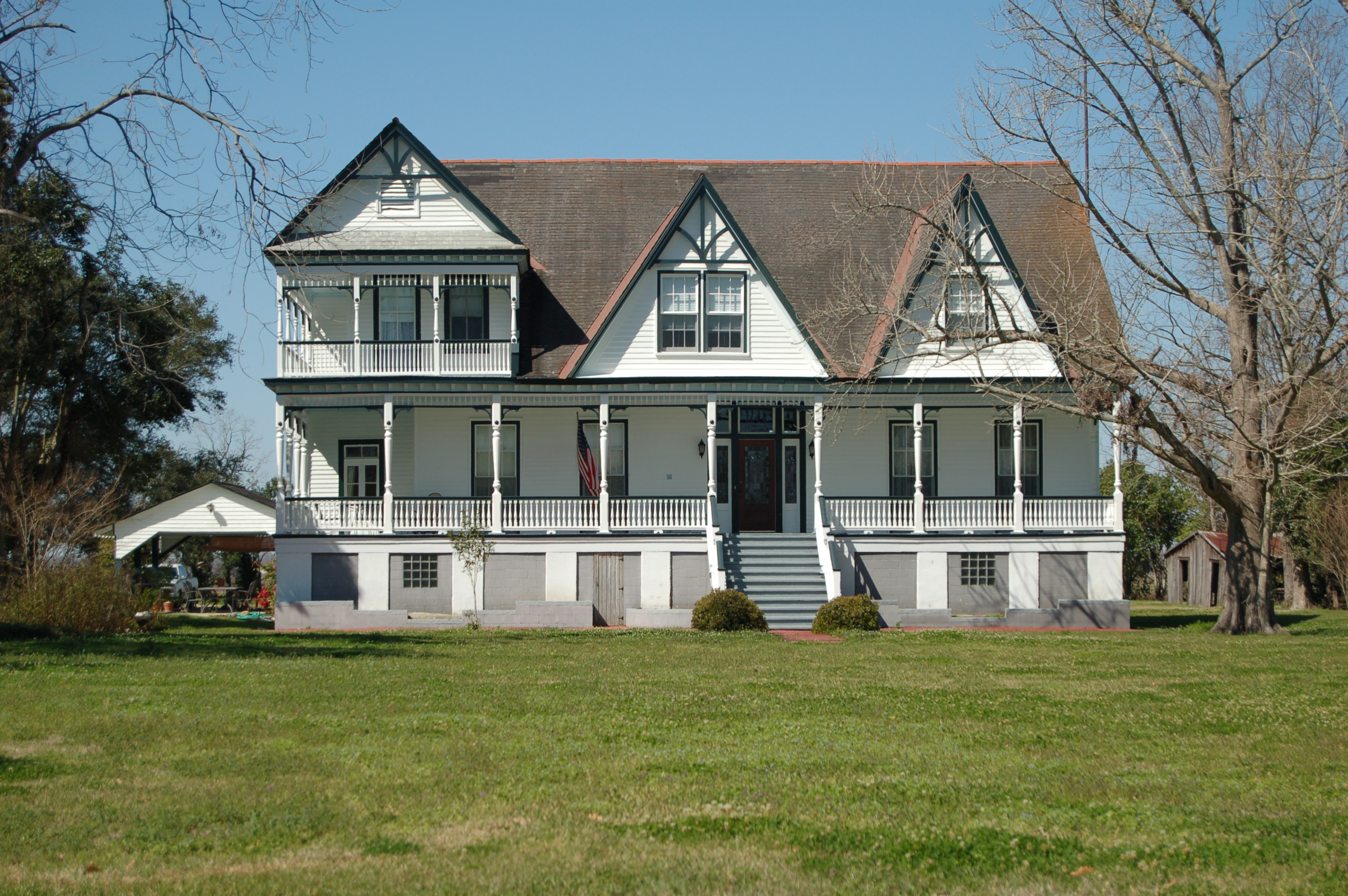
- The Smithfield Plantation in 2005

- Location within Louisiana
- Nearest city: Port Allen, Louisiana
- Coordinates: 30°32′59″N 91°17′27″W
- Area: 3 acres (1.2 ha)
- Built: 1875
- Architectural style: Stick/eastlake, Italianate, Queen Anne
- NRHP reference No.: 95000387
- Added to NRHP: April 7, 1995

For the plantation in Fredericksburg, Virginia, see Smithfield Plantation (Fredericksburg, Virginia). The Smithfield Plantation is a former sugar plantation with a historic mansion in Port Allen, Louisiana, U.S. It has been listed on the National Register of Historic Places since April 7, 1995.
