= Aillet House =

United States historic place

- U.S. National Register of Historic Places
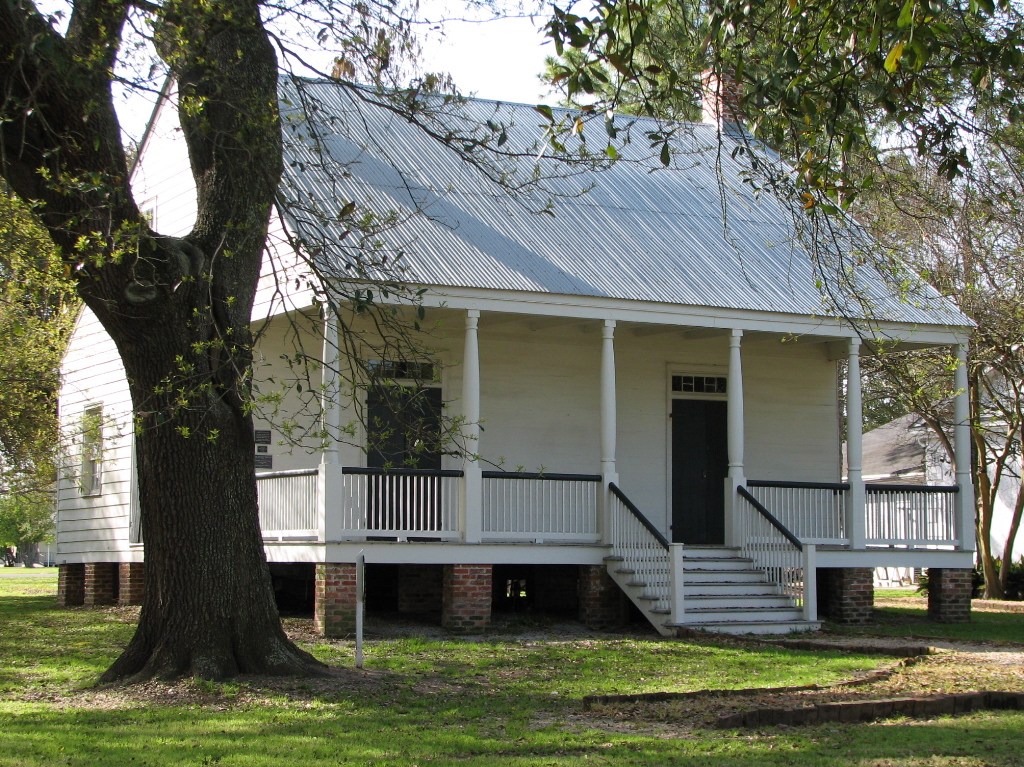
- The Aillet House in 2007

- Location within Louisiana Location within the United States
- Location: 845 N. Jefferson Avenue, Port Allen, Louisiana
- Coordinates: 30°27′35″N 91°12′22″W
- Area: less than one acre
- Built: 1830
- Architectural style: Federal, French Creole
- MPS: Louisiana's French Creole Architecture MPS
- NRHP reference No.: 91001046
- Added to NRHP: August 9, 1991

Aillet House is a historic plantation in Port Allen, Louisiana, United States. It was built circa 1830 with bousillage. It belonged to Jean Dorville Landry, a sugar planter prior to the American Civil War of 1861–1865. It has been listed on the National Register of Historic Places since August 9, 1991. The building was donated to the West Baton Rouge Museum and moved to their campus in Port Allen.

== See also ==
- Addis Museum
- National Register of Historic Places listings in West Baton Rouge Parish, Louisiana
