= William S. Patout III =

American businessman (1932–2017)

William Patout
- Born: William Schwing Patout III; October 15, 1932; New Iberia, Louisiana U.S.
- Died: August 5, 2017 (aged 84); Lafayette, Louisiana, U.S.
- Other name: Billy Patout
- Education: Louisiana State University (BS)
- Political party: Republican
- Spouse: Susan Crawford Patout (m. 1971)
- Children: 7

William Schwing Patout, III (October 15, 1932 – August 5, 2017), was an American businessman and agricultural engineer from New Iberia, Louisiana.

In 1832, his family began operating M. A. Patout Enterprise. The firm is managed by a non-family member president and board of trustees, but Patout continued in his later years as a consultant and a member of the company board of directors, who remain family members.

== Early life and education ==
Patout was the oldest son of William S. Patout Jr. (1908–1991), and the former Hester Catherine Bernadas (1911–1982). When Patout was eight years old, his family moved to Patoutville in Iberia Parish, where he developed his interest in the sugar industry. Patout earned a Bachelor of Science degree in Agricultural Engineering from Louisiana State University.

== Career ==
After graduating from college, Patout began his career with the M. A. Patout Company in 1956. He worked there as an assistant engineer for three years before moving on to become an engineer for Brewer & Co. in Honolulu from 1959 to 1960. He moved from company to company to gain work experience before rejoining his family's company in 1970. He started as an assistant general manager and worked his way up to president and chief executive officer.

Patout is credited with having kept M. A. Patout afloat during his tenure. Despite drought, crop disease, hurricanes, freezes, low sugar prices, and the loss of land because of pressure from residential and commercial developments, Patout was able to expand the company. He acquired Sterling Sugars, Inc., from former Governor Mike Foster and Raceland Sugars. He increased the sugar-growing acreage from 12,000 to 56,000.

Under Patout's leadership, the Enterprise mill in Patoutville became the first and only factory to mill two million tons of cane, and was the only cane diffuser operating in North America.

Patout sat on the board of M. A. Patout and was a consultant for sugar businesses around the world. He advised China on the country's sugar industry and was also served as an advisor to the United States Department of Commerce, in addition to private companies in Jamaica and Mexico.

=== M. A. Patout ===
M. A. Patout & Sons, Ltd. is the 18th oldest family-owned company in the United States, incorporated in 1910. It began when Simeon Patout moved his family from France, where he ran a winery, to Isle Picante in Louisiana in the late 1820s. He began growing sugar cane and built a sugar mill. The area was renamed Patoutville.

When Simeon died of yellow fever in 1847, his wife Appoline took over the company, and under her direction, it continued to grow. Her son Hippolyte ran the company for a short time before he, too, succumbed to the disease, after which his widow, Mary Ann Schwing Patout, assumed control. Highly successful, she became the United States' first female member of a bank board and later its president. After her stint as head of M. A. Patout, the company was run by family members (in chronological order) Hippolyte Jr., William S. Patout, William S. Patout Jr., and William S. Patout, III. Billy Patout then hired a non-family member, Craig P. Caillier, to head the operations.

Today M. A. Patout runs three sugar mills which produce about a third of the sugar in the state of Louisiana, or 450,000 tons per year.

=== Awards and other activities ===
Patout won the Dyer Memorial "Sugar Man of the Year" award in 2007 and various other Louisiana awards throughout his career.

In addition to M. A. Patout, Patout was involved with:

- American Sugar Cane League, an interest group which seeks to direct agricultural and manufacturing research and impact legislation in Louisiana and in Washington D.C.; director, 1974–1999, and past president, 1997–1999
- Western Sugar Producers (represented Bayou Teche sugar factories): past president, 1974–1975; received the league's President's Award in 2000.
- Sugar Processing Research Institute (worked with United States Department of Agriculture): member, 1990–2001; past president, 1999–2001
- Agro-Flex (non-profit whose goal was to bring more agricultural business to Louisiana): past president, 1975–1975
- In 1997, he became a board member of the First National Bank of Jeanerette.

== Personal life ==
From 1954 to 1955, Patout served in the United States Navy. He married Susan Ann Crawford of Indiana in 1971, and the couple had seven children. At the time of his death, Patout had seventeen grandchildren and three great-grandchildren. Patout died in Lafayette, Louisiana at the age of 84 on August 5, 2017. A Roman Catholic, he is entombed at St. Nicholas Cemetery in Patoutville.
