= Sandbar Plantation =

Historic house in Louisiana, United States

- Sandbar Plantation House
- U.S. National Register of Historic Places
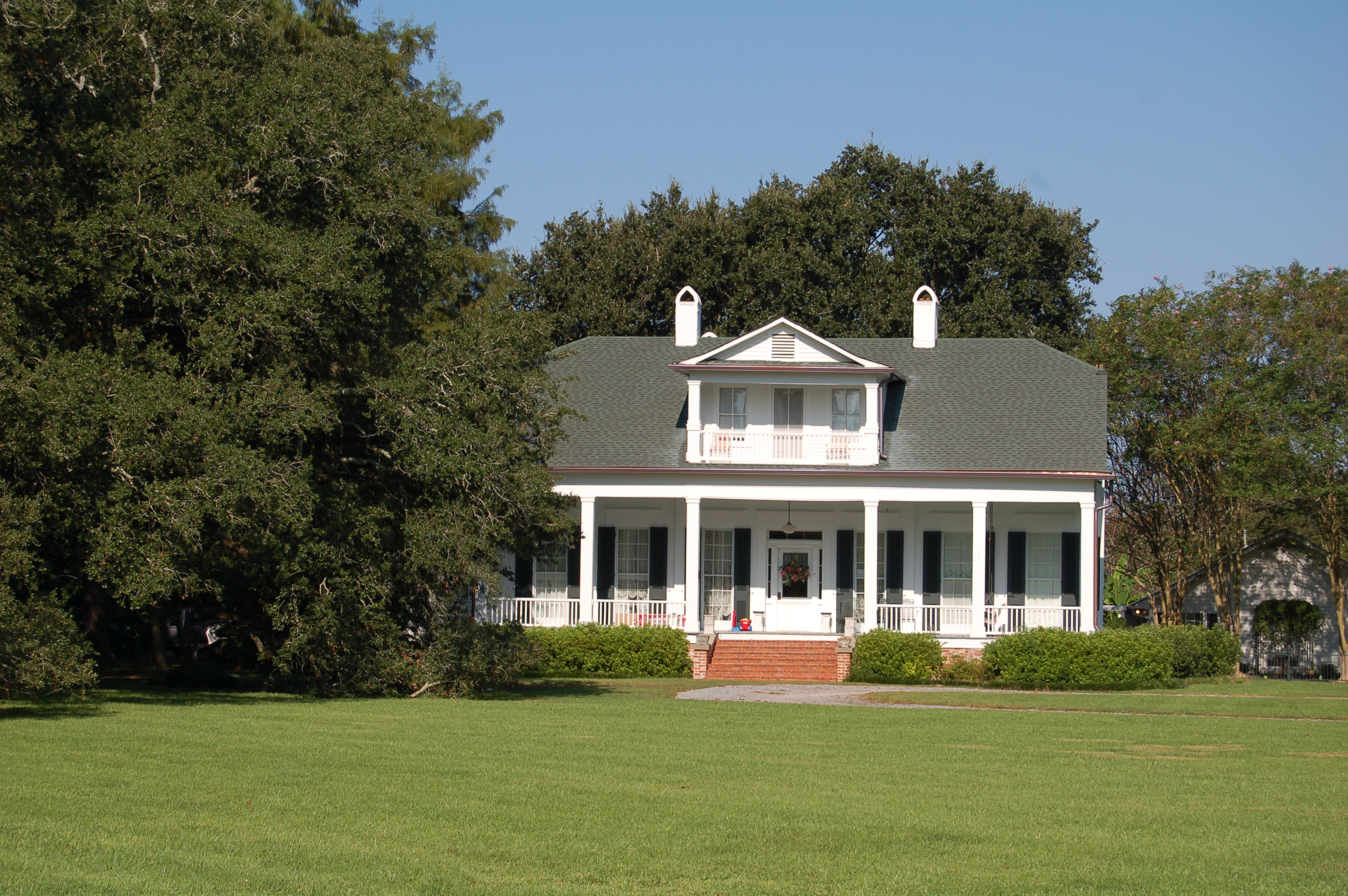
- The Sandbar Plantation House in 2014

- Location within Louisiana
- Nearest city: Port Allen, Louisiana
- Coordinates: 30°24′31″N 91°13′2″W
- Area: 3.1 acres (1.3 ha)
- Architectural style: Greek Revival, Colonial Revival
- NRHP reference No.: 99001039
- Added to NRHP: September 2, 1999

The Sandbar Plantation is a historic plantation with a mansion in Port Allen, Louisiana, U.S.. It was built circa 1837 for Dr. Thomas Philander and his wife, Marie Aureline Vaughan. It was purchased by Chas. H. Dameron in 1925. It has been listed on the National Register of Historic Places since September 2, 1999.
