= Edmond Jordan =

American politician (born 1971)

Edmond Dwayne Jordan
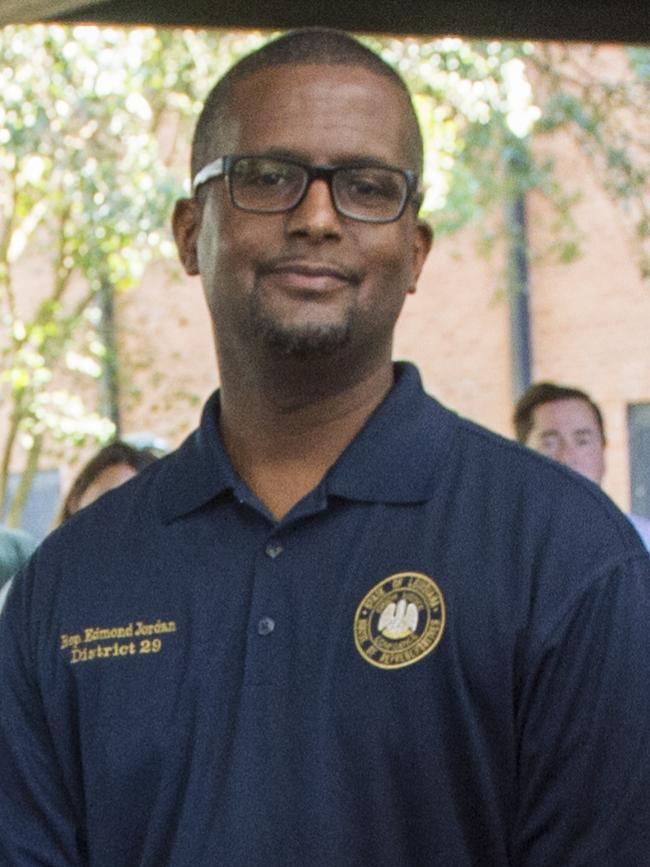

Member of the Louisiana House of Representatives from the 29th district
- Incumbent
- Assumed office May 2016
- Preceded by: Ronnie Edwards

Personal details
- Born: June 1971 (age 55) Brusly, Louisiana, US
- Party: Democratic
- Spouse: Stacie
- Children: 2
- Education: Southern University; Southern University Law Center
- Occupation: Lawyer, insurance agent

Edmond Dwayne Jordan (born June 1971) is an American attorney and politician. He is a Democratic member of the Louisiana House of Representatives for District 29. On May 14, 2016, he won a special election runoff to succeed fellow Democrat Ronnie Edwards.

== Background ==
Life-long Brusly resident Jordan graduated from Brusly High School in Brusly, Louisiana and the historically black Southern University and the Southern University Law Center in the capital city of Baton Rouge. An attorney since 1998, Jordan has represented the Louisiana Public Service Commission, the Louisiana Department of Environmental Quality, and the United States Department of Homeland Security. He co-owns Cypress Insurance Agency in Baton Rouge. He is a graduate of the leadership programs offered by both the West Baton Rouge/Iberville Chamber of Commerce and the Council For A Better Louisiana. He is a member of the West Baton Rouge Chamber of Commerce.

He and his wife, Stacie, have two children, Jailen and Jace Jordan.

== Political life ==
On November 21, 2015, Jordan lost the House race to Ronnie Edwards the regular general election. He polled 4,768 votes (40.9 percent) to Edwards' 6,887 (59.1 percent). Edwards defeated Jordan to succeed Representative Regina Barrow, who in turn followed Sharon Weston Broome in the Louisiana State Senate. Barrow and Broome are also African-American Democrats. Edwards like Barrow formerly worked for Broome. Gary Chambers of The Rouge Collection wrote that Jordan answered questions in a public forum while Edwards did not make an appearance. "Honestly, in the white community, this would never have happened. We as blacks blindly vote for people, based on name recognition, and we must change this pattern," Chambers said.

Five Democrats were candidates in the special election held on April 9 to choose Edwards' successor. In the second round of balloting between the top two vote-getters, Jordan defeated in a low-turnout contest another Democrat, Vereta Tanner Lee (born March 1958), a third-term member of the East Baton Rouge Parish School Board, 2,019 votes (59.6 percent) and 1,368 (40.4 percent). Eliminated in the primary were Tyra Banks Sterling, who had been Edwards' former legislative assistant, attorney Victor Woods, Jr., and Albert White, occupation not available. No Republican filed in the heavily Democratic district.

In the 2015 campaign, Jordan focused on what he called setting the "state budget in line with the priorities that enhance opportunity, not diminish it. Strong economic development and the retention of high quality graduates is an absolute necessity. More specifically, I will fight to balance the disproportionate economic disparity between north and south Baton Rouge. Instead of trying to form a new city, we need to bring businesses to District 29 and help rejuvenate this district."

Governor John Bel Edwards called to congratulate his fellow Democrat on learning of Jordan's election to the state House.

=== Attorney for Alton Sterling family ===
Jordan has acted as an attorney and spokesman for the family of Alton Sterling, a black man who was shot several times at close range while held down on the ground by two white police officers in Baton Rouge, Louisiana.

Louisiana House of Representatives
| Preceded by Ronnie Edwards | Louisiana State Representative for District 29 (East and West Baton Rouge parishes); 2016– | Succeeded by Incumbent |
