= Brusly, Louisiana =

- Town
- Town of Brusly
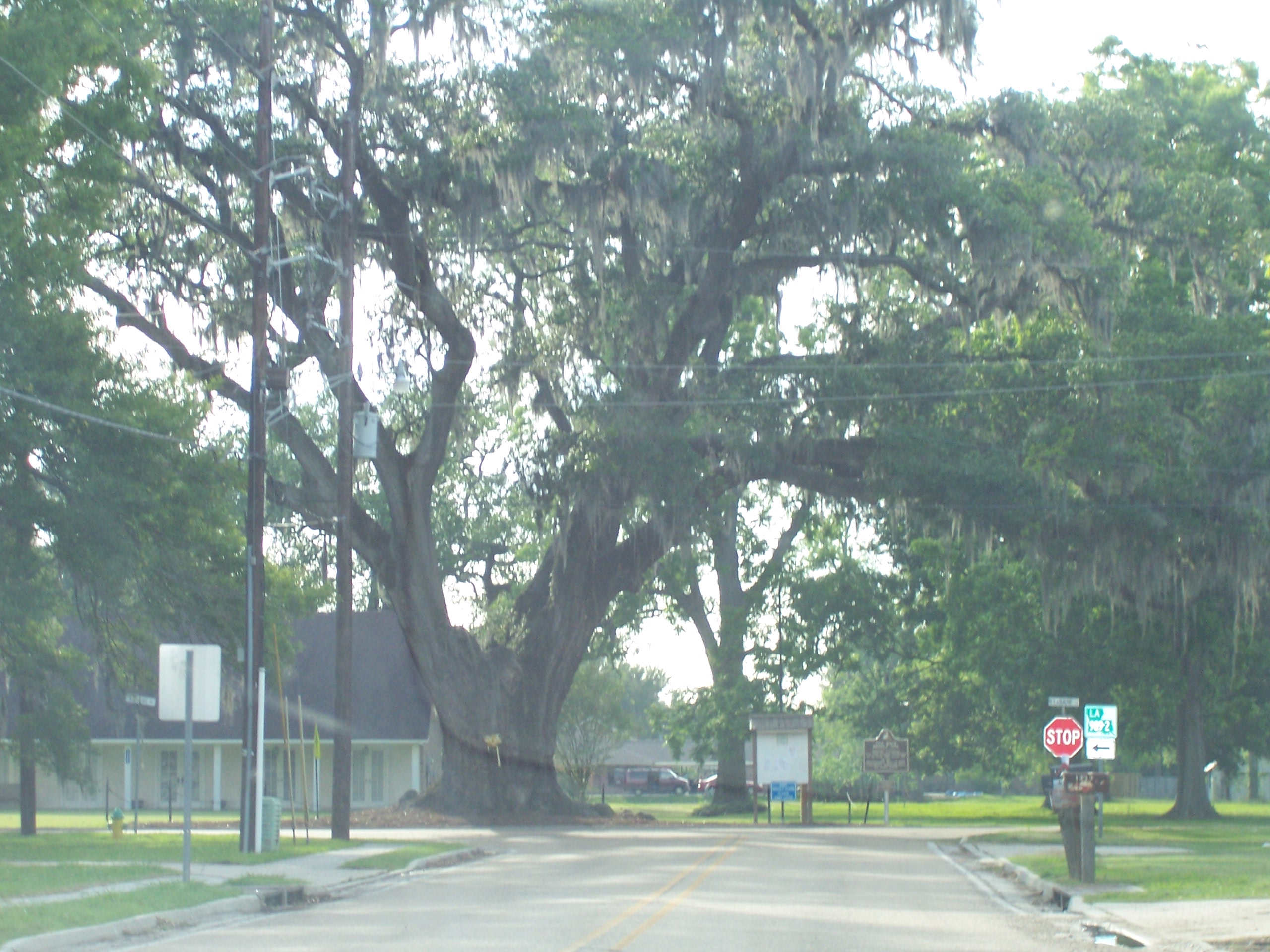
- The Famous Brusly Oak

- Flag Logo

- Location of Brusly in West Baton Rouge Parish, Louisiana.

- Location of Louisiana in the United States
- Coordinates: 30°23′30″N 91°14′40″W
- Country: United States
- State: Louisiana
- Parish: West Baton Rouge
- Established: 1901

Area
  - Total: 2.21 sq mi (5.73 km^{2})
  - Land: 2.21 sq mi (5.73 km^{2})
  - Water: 0 sq mi (0.00 km^{2})
- Elevation: 23 ft (7.0 m)

Population (2020)
  - Total: 2,578
  - Density: 1,164.8/sq mi (449.74/km^{2})
- Time zone: UTC-6 (CST)
  - Summer (DST): UTC-5 (CDT)
- ZIP code: 70719
- Area code: 225
- FIPS code: 22-10600
- GNIS feature ID: 2405338
- Website: www.bruslyla.com

Brusly is a town in West Baton Rouge Parish, Louisiana, United States. As of the 2020 census, Brusly had a population of 2,578. It is part of the Baton Rouge Metropolitan Statistical Area.

== History ==
The town was established in 1901. Its Brusly High School bears the nickname, the Panthers. Its colors are red, white and black. Newly elected State Representative Edmond Jordan graduated from Brusly High School in 1989.

The Cinclare Sugar Mill Historic District is located just north of town on Louisiana Highway 1.

== Geography ==
According to the United States Census Bureau, the town has a total area of 2.2 square miles (5.7 km^{2}), all land.

== Demographics ==
Historical population
Census	Pop.	Note	%±
1880	216		—
1890	315		45.8%
1910	390		—
1920	400		2.6%
1930	345		−13.7%
1940	433		25.5%
1950	493		13.9%
1960	544		10.3%
1970	1,282		135.7%
1980	1,762		37.4%
1990	1,824		3.5%
2000	2,020		10.7%
2010	2,589		28.2%
2020	2,578		−0.4%
2025 (est.)	2,614	▲	1.4%
U.S. Decennial Census

Brusly racial composition as of 2020
Race	Number	Percentage
White (non-Hispanic)	1,788	69.36%
Black or African American (non-Hispanic)	601	23.31%
Asian	18	0.7%
Other/Mixed	54	2.09%
Hispanic or Latino	117	4.54%

As of the 2020 United States census, there were 2,578 people, 1,033 households, and 764 families residing in the town, reflecting an increase since the 2000 census.

As of the census of 2000, there were 2,020 people, 749 households, and 587 families residing in the town. The population density was 924.1 inhabitants per square mile (356.8/km^{2}). There were 783 housing units at an average density of 358.2 per square mile (138.3/km^{2}). The racial makeup of the town was 72.77% Caucasian, 25.74% African American, 0.15% Native American, 0.15% Asian, 0.15% Pacific Islander, 0.25% from other races, and 0.79% from two or more races. Hispanic or Latino of any race were 0.89% of the population.

There were 749 households, out of which 36.8% had children under the age of 18 living with them, 59.5% were married couples living together, 15.1% had a female householder with no husband present, and 21.5% were non-families. 19.2% of all households were made up of individuals, and 8.9% had someone living alone who was 65 years of age or older. The average household size was 2.70 and the average family size was 3.09.

In the town, the population was spread out, with 26.4% under the age of 18, 9.1% from 18 to 24, 27.1% from 25 to 44, 26.4% from 45 to 64, and 11.0% who were 65 years of age or older. The median age was 36 years. For every 100 females, there were 92.4 males. For every 100 women age 18 and over, there were 88.2 men.

The median income for a household in the town was $47,619, and the median income for a family was $55,100. Males had a median income of $37,330 versus $25,719 for females. The per capita income for the town was $18,060. About 5.9% of families and 6.7% of the population were below the poverty line, including 8.0% of those under age 18 and 13.5% of those age 65 or over.

== Government ==
The town maintains a police department.

== Notable people ==
- Charles P. Adams - founding president of Grambling State University was born in Brusly.
- Amie Comeaux - country music artist
- Randall Gay - National Football League cornerback
- Edmond Jordan - lawyer and state representative since May 2016
- William S. Patout, III, Iberia Parish sugar grower; resided in Brusly in the early 1960s.
