= West Baton Rouge Parish, Louisiana =

Parish in Louisiana, United States

West Baton Rouge Parish
- Parish
- Parish of West Baton Rouge; Paroisse de Bâton Rouge Ouest (French); Parroquia del Oeste de Baton Rouge (Spanish)
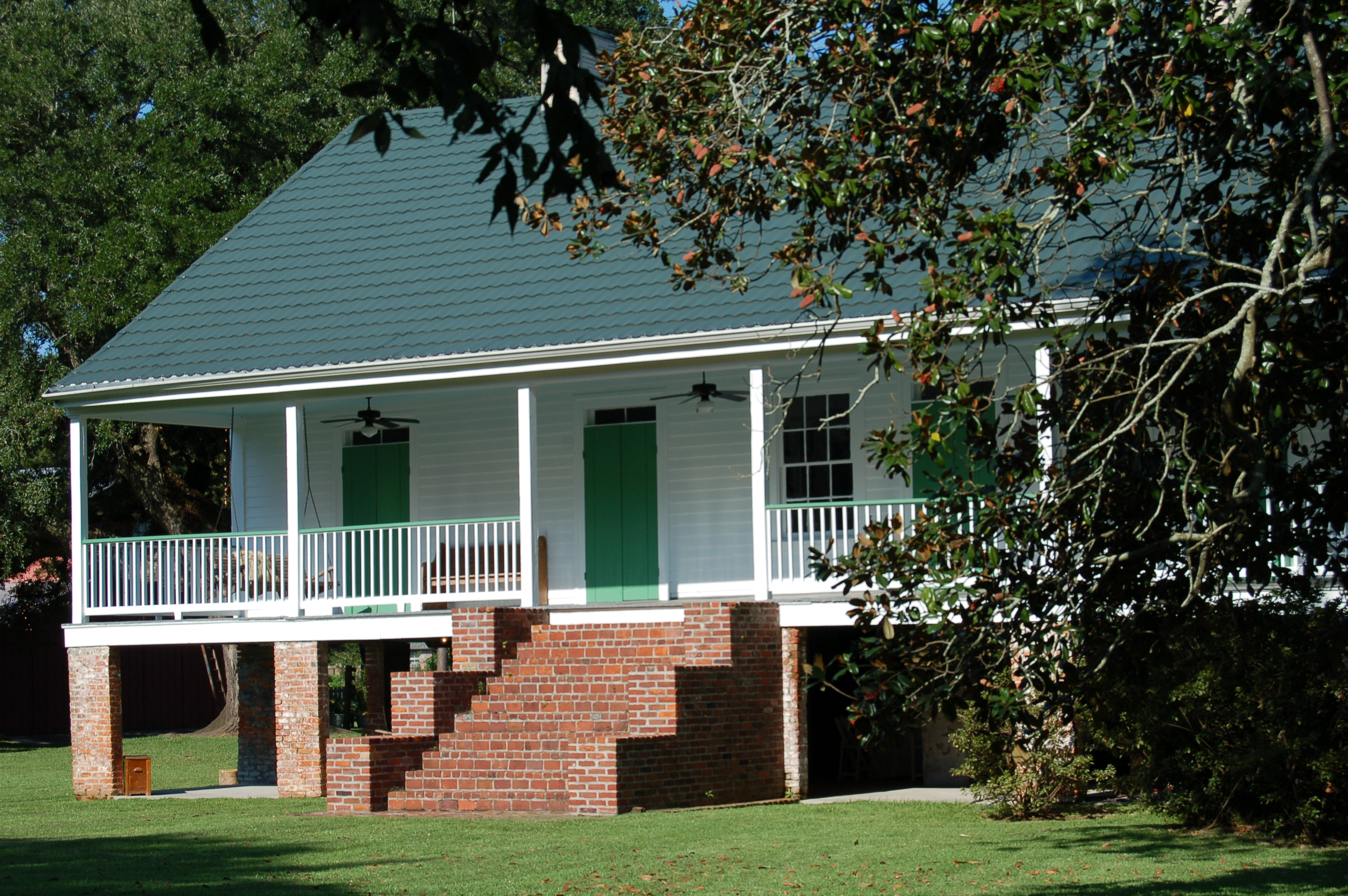
- Antonia (Port Allen, Louisiana)

- Location within the U.S. state of Louisiana
- Coordinates: 30°28′N 91°19′W
- Country: United States
- State: Louisiana
- Founded: March 31, 1807
- Named for: bâton rouge, French for red stick
- Seat: Port Allen
- Largest city: Addis

Area
  - Total: 204 sq mi (530 km^{2})
  - Land: 192 sq mi (500 km^{2})
  - Water: 11 sq mi (28 km^{2}) 5.6%

Population (2020)
  - Total: 27,199
  - Estimate (2025): 28,756 ▲
  - Density: 142/sq mi (54.7/km^{2})
- Time zone: UTC−6 (Central)
  - Summer (DST): UTC−5 (CDT)
- Congressional districts: 2nd, 6th
- Website: www.wbrcouncil.org

West Baton Rouge Parish (French: Paroisse de Bâton Rouge Ouest, Spanish: Parroquia del Oeste de Baton Rouge) is one of the sixty-four parishes in the U.S. state of Louisiana. Established in 1807, its parish seat is Port Allen. With a 2020 census population of 27,199 residents, West Baton Rouge Parish is part of the Baton Rouge metropolitan statistical area.

The parish has a highly rated school system, and is one of the few in Louisiana that has privatized school bus services. West Baton Rouge saw a very small percentage of growth after Hurricane Katrina. According to an estimate of July 2018, the parish's population was 26,427.

== History ==
=== Prehistory ===
The Medora site, a Plaquemine culture mound site located adjacent to Bayou Bourbeaux on the flood plain of Manchac Point, a hair-pin bend of the Mississippi River in the southeast corner of the parish, was instrumental in defining the Plaquemine culture and period. The site was excavated in the winter of 1939–40 by James A. Ford and George I. Quimby, for the Louisiana State Archaeological Survey, a joint project of Louisiana State University and the Work Projects Administration.

=== Historic era ===
West Baton Rouge Parish was formed in 1807; it was named Baton Rouge Parish until 1812.

The Baton Rouge, Gross-Tete and Opelousas Railroad was chartered in 1853. The company had an eastern terminus on the west bank of the Mississippi River across from Baton Rouge in what later became the City of Port Allen. A steam ferry boat, the Sunny South, made three trips a day to connect the railroad to Baton Rouge. The railroad ran westward into neighboring Iberville Parish passing the village of Rosedale. After reaching Bayou Grosse-Tete near the village of Grosse Tete, the line turned to the northwest and ran to Livonia in Pointe Coupee Parish, Louisiana, a total distance of twenty-six miles. The roadbed westward from Livonia to the Atchafalaya River had been prepared by 1861.

=== Civil War ===
The advent of the Civil War prevented the railroad from getting the necessary rails to complete the line. The tracks to Opelousas were never built.

After Louisiana seceded, two companies of militia were organized in West Baton Rouge, the Delta Rifles, headed by Captain Favrot and the Tirailleurs of Brusly Landing, a French-speaking company of creoles headed by Captain Williams. The two West Baton Rouge companies were included in the 4th Louisiana Regiment, commanded by Colonel Robert J. Barrow, assisted by Lieutenant Colonel Henry Watkins Allen. The regiment participated in the Battle of Shiloh, the Battle of Baton Rouge and other actions.

The railroad operated up until May 1862 carrying sugar cane, cotton, and Confederate troops, including the Delta Rifles headed by Captain H. M. Favrot. When Union force occupied Baton Rouge in May 1862, all rolling stock was sent to the extreme western end of the railroad for safety where it remained for the duration of the war. Mr. J. V. Duralde was the president of the company during the Civil War period.

Many Baton Rouge residents took refuge in West Baton Rouge Parish during the Union occupation of Baton Rouge in 1862. Sarah Morgan saw the CSS Arkansas, a Confederate ram, tied to the bank below the levee in West Baton Rouge Parish prior to the Battle of Baton Rouge. Morgan observed the Battle of Baton Rouge from West Baton Rouge Parish.

The Arkansas suffered failure of its port engine while proceeding upriver during the battle to get into position to attack the USS Essex. This caused it to veer into the West Baton Rouge bank about 600 feet south of mile marker 223, where it ran hard aground. The crew of the Arkansas then set the vessel afire and scuttled it to avoid it falling into enemy hands.

The defeated Union army under the command of Major General Nathaniel P. Banks passed through West Baton Rouge Parish on Rosedale Road on its return to New Orleans in May 1864, after the failure of the Red River Campaign.

==== Post-Civil War period ====
The American Civil War devastated the sugar industry that had flourished in the southern part of Louisiana, including West Baton Rouge Parish, prior to the war. The control of the Mississippi River by the Union prevented the sugar crop from going to market, Horses and mules were seized by the Union forces, and crops were left unharvested in the fields, so the sugar industry was bankrupt at the end of the Civil War. Many sugar plantations were taken over by northern interests. West Baton Rouge Parish was no exception. The conveyance records on file with the Clerk-of-Court of West Baton Rouge Parish show that many plantation properties were sold at sheriff's sale to satisfy debts in the years immediately after the end of the Civil War.

The Baton Rouge, Grosse Tete, and Opelousas Railroad resumed operation after the end of hostilities, but found the economy adverse, because of the devastation in agriculture. Moreover, its sixty-nine slaves had been emancipated and had to be replaced with hired labor. Furthermore, the "Great Crevasse", which occurred in the north end of West Baton Rouge Parish in 1867, caused flooding that greatly damaged the track in a low section about six miles west of the Mississippi River. The now unprofitable rail company eventually ceased operations in 1883. The assets of the railroad were acquired by the Louisiana Central Railroad and operated until 1902.

The Texas and Pacific Railway was chartered by the United States Congress in 1871 to build a southern transcontinental railroad. The route started in Westwego (on the west bank of the Mississippi near New Orleans) and ran northwestward on the west bank of the Mississippi and on to Alexandria, Shreveport, thence westward to Fort Worth, and El Paso where it joined the Southern Pacific Railroad. The route passes through the southwestern part of West Baton Rouge Parish. A junction was established in the southern part of the parish from which a spur line ran twelve miles northward to the west bank of the Mississippi river across from Baton Rouge at a location which was already called "Port Allen". The junction was called "Baton Rouge Junction". The town of Addis grew up around Baton Rouge Junction. The Texas and Pacific acquired additional right-of-way in 1899 to extend the spur from Port Allen to New Roads, Louisiana and beyond to Alexandria, Louisiana.

==== Twentieth century ====
A crevasse in northern Point Coupeé Parish near Torras in May 1912 caused flooding that spread into northern West Baton Rouge Parish and southward to Addis west of the Texas and Pacific Railroad.

The Texas and Pacific was merged into the Missouri Pacific Railroad in 1976. A further merger of the Missouri Pacific and the Union Pacific occurred in 1997, making the Texas and Pacific part of the Union Pacific Railroad.

The Southern Pacific Railroad built a spur line from Lafayette, Louisiana to Anchorage in West Baton Rouge very early in the twentieth century. The line ran in a straight line and is notable for crossing the Atchafalaya Basin. The line was never financially successful and was abandoned in the 1920s. Southern Pacific Road occupies the former right-of-way of a small portion of the line.

Starting in 1906, the Missouri Pacific Railroad operated the George H. Walker, a rail ferry, called a "transfer boat", from Anchorage (immediately north of the Sunrise Community) in West Baton Rouge Parish across the Mississippi River to Baton Rouge in East Baton Rouge Parish. The transfer boat was steam-powered and equipped with rails on its deck that allowed passenger and freight railcars to be rolled on and off. It ceased operation September 2, 1947, after the construction of the Huey P. Long Bridge, which included a railway, made its continued operation unnecessary.

West Baton Rouge Parish was the location of Prisoner of War Sub-Camp 7 from 1943 until mid-1946. The camp housed German prisoners who were deployed as plantation labor. The camp was located on West Baton Rouge Parish property fronting on Sixth Street in Port Allen.

The Cinclare Sugar Mill Historic District is located in West Baton Rouge Parish near Brusly.

== Geography ==
According to the U.S. Census Bureau, the parish has a total area of 204 square miles (530 km^{2}), of which 192 square miles (500 km^{2}) is land and 11 square miles (28 km^{2}) (5.6%) is water. It is the second-smallest parish in Louisiana by land area and smallest by total area.

The southwestern portion of the parish is uninhabited timberland. The most prominent geographic feature is the Mississippi River which forms the east border of the parish. Levees along the river protect the parish from flooding by the Mississippi River in times of high water.

The parish is contained within the Two Rivers Region of the Atchafalaya National Heritage Area.

=== Adjacent parishes ===
- West Feliciana Parish (north)
- East Baton Rouge Parish (east)
- East Feliciana Parish (northeast)
- Iberville Parish (southwest)
- Pointe Coupeé Parish (northwest)

=== Communities ===
==== City ====
- Port Allen (parish seat)

==== Towns ====
- Addis (largest municipality)
- Brusly

==== Census-designated place ====
- Erwinville

==== Unincorporated communities ====
- Winterville
- Bueche
- Chamberlin
- Devalls
- Ithra
- Kahns
- Lobdell
- Lukeville
- Walls

== Demographics ==
Historical population
Census	Pop.	Note	%±
1810	1,463		—
1820	2,335		59.6%
1830	3,084		32.1%
1840	4,638		50.4%
1850	6,270		35.2%
1860	7,312		16.6%
1870	5,114		−30.1%
1880	7,667		49.9%
1890	8,363		9.1%
1900	10,285		23.0%
1910	12,636		22.9%
1920	11,092		−12.2%
1930	9,716		−12.4%
1940	11,263		15.9%
1950	11,738		4.2%
1960	14,796		26.1%
1970	16,864		14.0%
1980	19,086		13.2%
1990	19,419		1.7%
2000	21,601		11.2%
2010	23,788		10.1%
2020	27,199		14.3%
2025 (est.)	28,756	▲	5.7%
U.S. Decennial Census; 1790-1960 1900-1990; 1990-2000 2010

West Baton Rouge Parish, Louisiana – Racial and ethnic composition Note: the US Census treats Hispanic/Latino as an ethnic category. This table excludes Latinos from the racial categories and assigns them to a separate category. Hispanics/Latinos may be of any race.
Race / Ethnicity (NH = Non-Hispanic)	Pop 1980	Pop 1990	Pop 2000	Pop 2010	Pop 2020	% 1980	% 1990	% 2000	% 2010	% 2020
White alone (NH)	11,150	12,170	13,394	13,931	14,114	58.42%	62.67%	62.01%	58.56%	51.89%
Black or African American alone (NH)	7,525	6,972	7,649	8,953	10,714	39.43%	35.90%	35.41%	37.64%	39.39%
Native American or Alaska Native alone (NH)	18	29	44	27	59	0.09%	0.15%	0.20%	0.11%	0.22%
Asian alone (NH)	21	25	39	72	219	0.11%	0.13%	0.18%	0.30%	0.81%
Native Hawaiian or Pacific Islander alone (NH)	x	x	4	1	8	x	x	0.02%	0.00%	0.03%
Other race alone (NH)	18	17	10	26	70	0.09%	0.09%	0.05%	0.11%	0.26%
Mixed race or Multiracial (NH)	x	x	148	234	771	x	x	0.69%	0.98%	2.83%
Hispanic or Latino (any race)	354	206	313	544	1,244	1.85%	1.06%	1.45%	2.29%	4.57%
Total	19,086	19,419	21,601	23,788	27,199	100.00%	100.00%	100.00%	100.00%	100.00%

As of the 2020 United States census, there were 27,199 people, 9,643 households, and 7,194 families residing in the parish. As of the census of 2000, there were 21,601 people, 7,663 households, and 5,739 families residing in the parish. The population density was 113 inhabitants per square mile (44/km^{2}). There were 8,370 housing units at an average density of 44 per square mile (17/km^{2}). The racial makeup of the parish was 62.78% White, 35.49% Black or African American, 0.20% Native American, 0.19% Asian, 0.02% Pacific Islander, 0.53% from other races, and 0.79% from two or more races. 1.45% of the population were Hispanic or Latino of any race.

There were 8,386 households, out of which 37.60% had children under the age of 18 living with them, 51.50% were married couples living together, 18.20% had a female householder with no husband present, and 25.10% were non-families. 21.50% of all households were made up of individuals, and 7.10% had someone living alone who was 65 years of age or older. The average household size was 2.74 and the average family size was 3.20.

In the parish the population was spread out, with 28.10% under the age of 18, 9.90% from 18 to 24, 30.60% from 25 to 44, 21.70% from 45 to 64, and 9.70% who were 65 years of age or older. The median age was 34 years. For every 100 females, there were 96.60 males. For every 100 females age 18 and over, there were 93.40 males.

The median income for a household in the parish was $47,298 and the per capita income was $22.101. Males had a median income of $35,618 versus $22,960 for females. About 13.20% of families and 16.00% of the population were below the poverty line, including 22.20% of those under age 18 and 13.10% of those age 65 or over.

== Economy ==
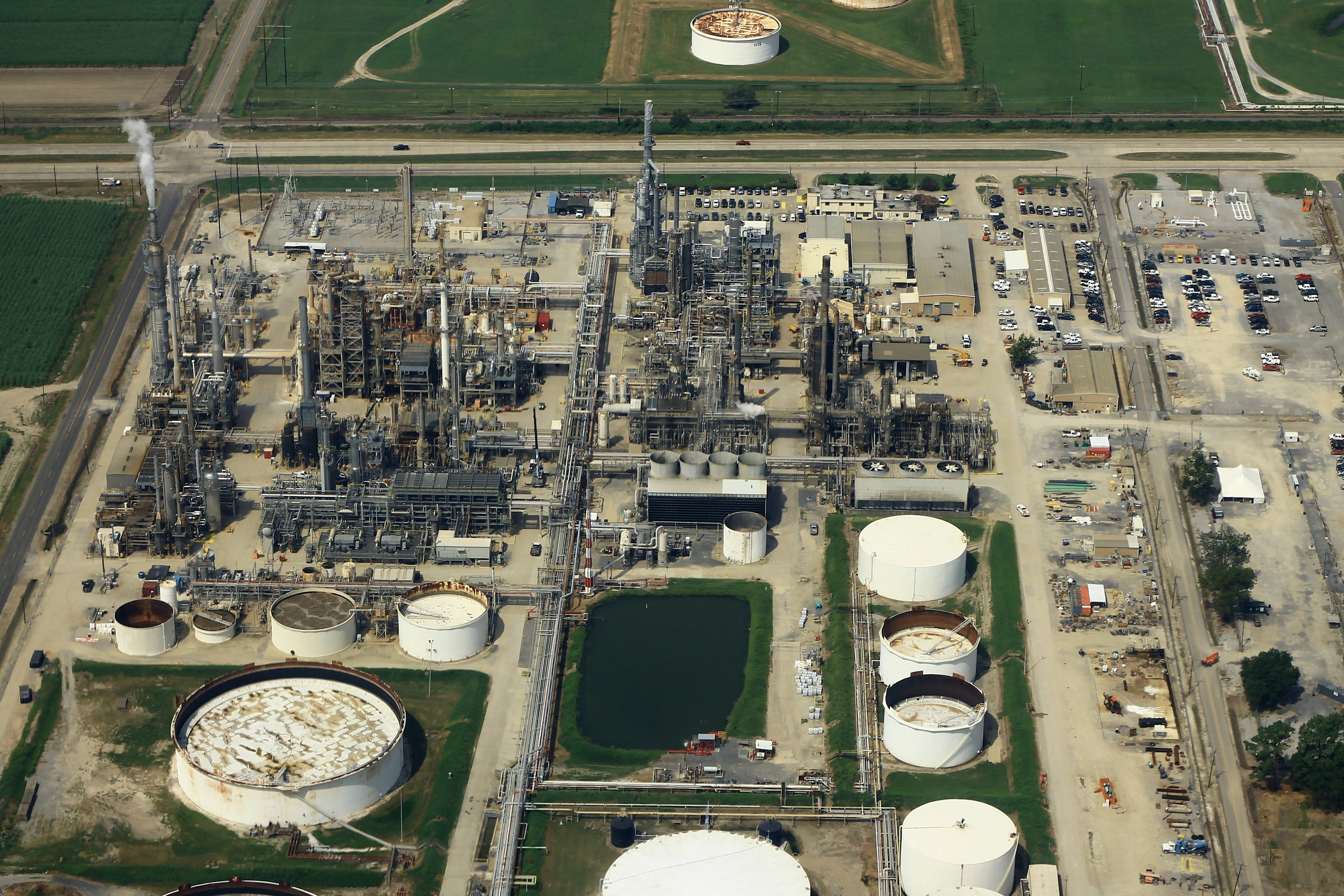
Aerial view of the Placid Refinery

West Baton Rouge's location on the Mississippi River plus railroad transportation has made it attractive to heavy industry. Notable industry includes Placid Refining Company near Port Allen and Dow Chemical Company and ShinTech near Addis.

The docks and other property of the Port of Greater Baton Rouge are located in West Baton Rouge Parish.

Interstate 10 makes West Baton Rouge attractive as a distribution center. A number of warehouses have been built near I-10. Many trucking firms have located near the Huey P. Long Bridge.

== Education ==
West Baton Rouge Parish School Board operates area public schools.

Holy Family School (of the Roman Catholic Diocese of Baton Rouge) is a local private Catholic school for grades pre-K through Eight.

It is in the service area of Baton Rouge Community College.

=== Museums and libraries ===
The West Baton Rouge Museum, located in Port Allen, maintains historical information on West Baton Rouge Parish. The Town of Addis operates a museum that keeps historical information about the Town of Addis.

The Parish of West Baton Rouge maintains a library in Port Allen, and in Brusly.

== Media ==
West Baton Rouge Parish is served by two weekly newspapers. The West Side Journal, published every Thursday, provides hard news and is the official journal of the parish. The Riverside Reader, published every Monday, focuses on items of historical interest and human interest stories.

After 88 years in print, The West Side Journal ceased publication with its final issue on October 31, 2024. Following the closure, The Advocate was adopted as the new official journal for the parish.

== Law and government ==
West Baton Rouge Parish is governed by a parish council that is made up of seven elected officials and one elected parish president.

West Baton Rouge Parish has three incorporated areas (Port Allen, Brusly, and Addis) with local police departments. The West Baton Rouge Sheriff's Department is responsible for law enforcement in all of the unincorporated areas.

United States presidential election results for West Baton Rouge Parish, Louisiana
Year	Republican		Democratic		Third party(ies)	
Year	No.	%	No.	%	No.	%
1912	19	9.31%	170	83.33%	15	7.35%
1916	28	10.37%	237	87.78%	5	1.85%
1920	175	33.21%	352	66.79%	0	0.00%
1924	92	28.40%	191	58.95%	41	12.65%
1928	78	11.37%	608	88.63%	0	0.00%
1932	96	13.93%	593	86.07%	0	0.00%
1936	80	8.43%	868	91.46%	1	0.11%
1940	141	10.63%	1,185	89.37%	0	0.00%
1944	87	7.69%	1,045	92.31%	0	0.00%
1948	141	12.08%	557	47.73%	469	40.19%
1952	704	35.48%	1,280	64.52%	0	0.00%
1956	1,035	44.73%	1,208	52.20%	71	3.07%
1960	390	12.42%	2,315	73.70%	436	13.88%
1964	1,835	49.24%	1,892	50.76%	0	0.00%
1968	669	12.73%	2,016	38.37%	2,569	48.90%
1972	2,626	53.14%	1,849	37.41%	467	9.45%
1976	1,913	32.51%	3,809	64.73%	162	2.75%
1980	2,828	36.48%	4,739	61.12%	186	2.40%
1984	4,189	47.16%	4,631	52.13%	63	0.71%
1988	3,972	45.13%	4,686	53.24%	143	1.62%
1992	3,522	35.30%	5,131	51.43%	1,323	13.26%
1996	3,254	33.21%	5,697	58.14%	847	8.64%
2000	4,924	48.42%	5,058	49.74%	187	1.84%
2004	5,822	53.73%	4,932	45.52%	81	0.75%
2008	6,654	56.08%	5,043	42.50%	169	1.42%
2012	6,922	54.19%	5,692	44.56%	160	1.25%
2016	6,927	54.49%	5,383	42.35%	402	3.16%
2020	7,684	54.51%	6,200	43.98%	213	1.51%
2024	7,627	55.12%	6,008	43.42%	201	1.45%

== Transportation ==
=== Major highways ===
- Interstate 10
- U.S. Highway 190
- Louisiana Highway 1
- Louisiana Highway 76
- Louisiana Highway 413
- Louisiana Highway 415
- Louisiana Highway 620
- Louisiana Highway 982
- Louisiana Highway 983
- Louisiana Highway 984
- Louisiana Highway 985
- Louisiana Highway 986
- Louisiana Highway 987-1
- Louisiana Highway 987-3
- Louisiana Highway 987-4
- Louisiana Highway 988
- Louisiana Highway 989-1
- Louisiana Highway 989-2
- Louisiana Highway 990
- Louisiana Highway 1145
- Louisiana Highway 1148
- Louisiana Highway 1269
- Louisiana Highway 3091
- Louisiana Highway 3237

West Baton Rouge Parish is connected to East Baton Rouge Parish by the Huey P. Long Bridge (U.S. Highway 190) and the Horace Wilkinson Bridge (Interstate 10).

=== Rail ===
West Baton Rouge is served by the Kansas City Southern Railroad and the Union Pacific Railroad.

== Notable people ==
- Henry Watkins Allen
- Slim Harpo
- John Hill
- Edmond Jordan, represents District 29 (West and East Baton Rouge parishes) in the Louisiana House of Representatives
- Raful Neal
- Major Thibaut, former member of the Louisiana House of Representatives

== See also ==
- National Register of Historic Places listings in West Baton Rouge Parish, Louisiana
- Louisiana in the Civil War
