= Port Allen, Louisiana =

Port Allen
- City
- City of Port Allen
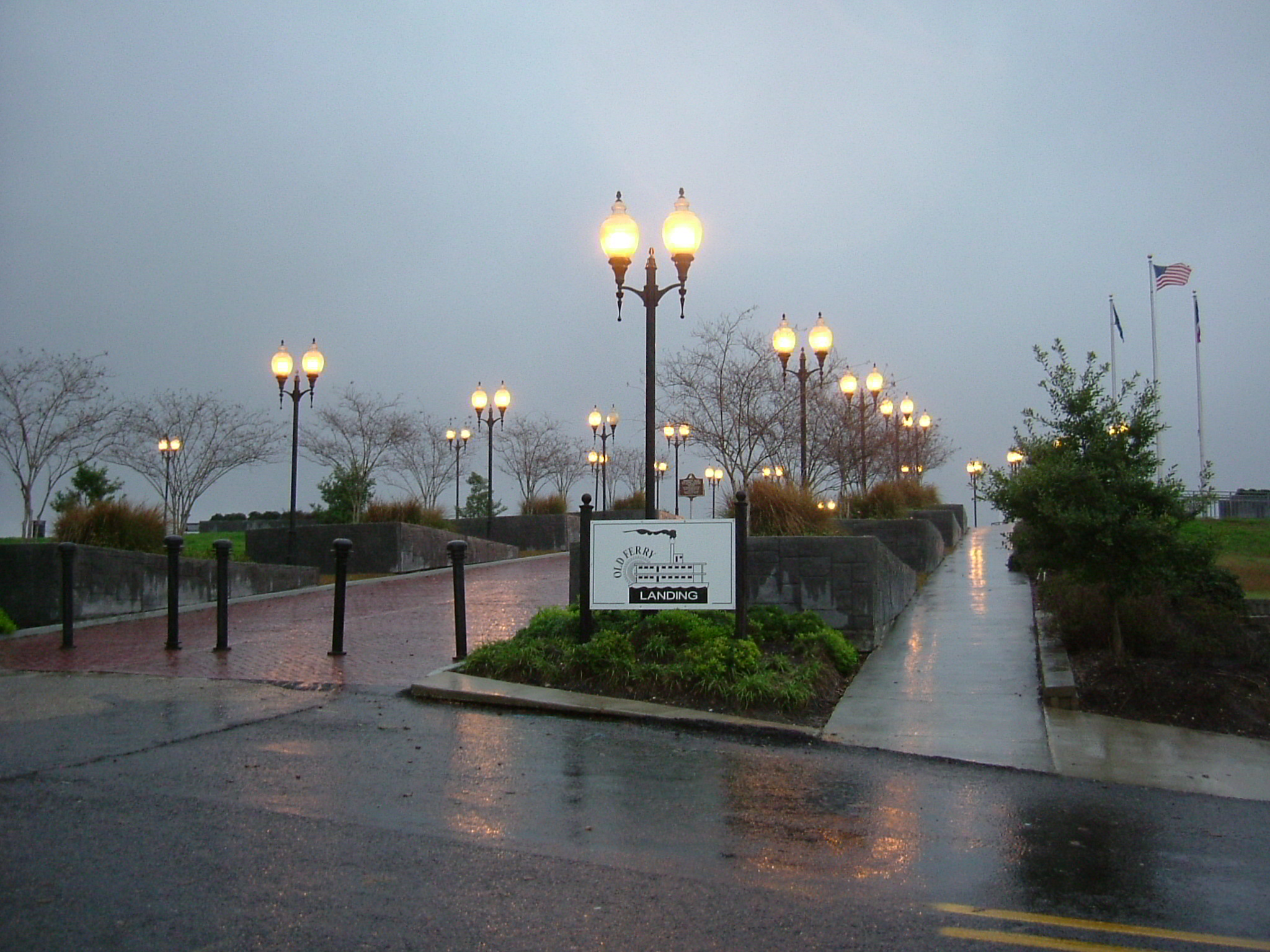
- The Old Ferry Landing at Port Allen

- Location of Port Allen in West Baton Rouge Parish, Louisiana.

- Location of Louisiana in the United States
- Coordinates: 30°26′44″N 91°12′35″W
- Country: United States
- State: Louisiana
- Parish: West Baton Rouge
- Incorporated: 1916
- Named for: Henry Watkins Allen

Area
  - Total: 3.33 sq mi (8.62 km^{2})
  - Land: 2.83 sq mi (7.34 km^{2})
  - Water: 0.49 sq mi (1.28 km^{2})
- Elevation: 26 ft (7.9 m)

Population (2020)
  - Total: 4,939
  - Density: 1,742.2/sq mi (672.66/km^{2})
- Time zone: UTC-6 (CST)
  - Summer (DST): UTC-5 (CDT)
- ZIP Code: 70767
- Area code: 225
- FIPS code: 22-61790
- GNIS feature ID: 2404553
- Website: www.portallen.org

Port Allen is a city in and the parish seat of West Baton Rouge Parish, Louisiana, United States. Located on the west bank of the Mississippi River, it is bordered by Interstate 10 and US Highway 190. The population was 4,939 in 2020. It is part of the Baton Rouge metropolitan statistical area.

Port Allen is home to the Mississippi Riverfront Development, which provides a panoramic view of the Mississippi River and Baton Rouge, the West Baton Rouge Museum, the City of Port Allen Railroad Depot, Scott's Cemetery, the Port of Greater Baton Rouge, and the Port Allen Lock.

== History ==
=== Pre-history ===
The village of La Ville de Saint-Michel or San Miguel (1790–1817) had existed in a nearby location to what is now the city of Port Allen. Around the 1850s, a new community had started around the same location and went by the name Town of West Baton Rouge.

=== Founding of Port Allen ===
The city of Port Allen was founded in 1878. The name Port Allen is in honor of Henry Watkins Allen, a member of the American Confederate States Army and the 17th Governor of Louisiana. Allen was instrumental in the early years of the village, prior to the founding of the city, he had owned a slave-worked sugar plantation in town he had started in 1855, the Allendale Plantation, and he created his own railroad that ran through the village.

=== Nearby Sunrise ===
Around 1878, a former slave named Alex Banes was creating a small community called Sunrise, which existed just north of what is now Port Allen. Many of the inhabitants of Sunrise worked at the railroad Anchorage Depot; by 1900 the depot had been moved taking much of the community's population with it. In 1918, Sunrise had a fire that destroyed much of the town and businesses, and as a result the area integrated into the neighboring town, which by then was known as Port Allen.

=== Industrialization and growth ===
By 1916, the city had incorporated. On August 10, 1940, the Huey P. Long Bridge at U.S. Route 190 was unveiled, which joined the east and west parishes, and shaping the city towards and aiding commerce and industries. Over time there was economic shifts away from agricultural and towards industrial, and in the 1950s factories and manufacturing plants were built in town. In 1963, the town population reached 5,000 and it was renamed as a city.

For many years the city was racially segregated.

== Geography ==
According to the United States Census Bureau, the city has a total area of 2.6 square miles (6.8 km^{2}), of which 2.1 square miles (5.5 km^{2}) is land and 0.5 square mile (1.3 km^{2}) (19.39%) is water. The city is adjacent to the Mississippi River, which passes to the east side of the city.

== Demographics ==
Historical population
Census	Pop.	Note	%±
1920	920		—
1930	1,524		65.7%
1940	1,898		24.5%
1950	3,097		63.2%
1960	5,026		62.3%
1970	5,728		14.0%
1980	6,114		6.7%
1990	6,277		2.7%
2000	5,278		−15.9%
2010	5,180		−1.9%
2020	4,939		−4.7%
2025 (est.)	5,015	▲	1.5%
U.S. Decennial Census; 2011 estimate

=== 2020 census ===
Port Allen city, Louisiana – Racial and ethnic composition Note: the US Census treats Hispanic/Latino as an ethnic category. This table excludes Latinos from the racial categories and assigns them to a separate category. Hispanics/Latinos may be of any race.
Race / Ethnicity (NH = Non-Hispanic)	Pop 2000	Pop 2010	Pop 2020	% 2000	% 2010	% 2020
White alone (NH)	2,345	2,043	1,660	44.43%	39.44%	33.61%
Black or African American alone (NH)	2,841	2,997	2,952	53.83%	57.86%	59.77%
Native American or Alaska Native alone (NH)	8	6	17	0.15%	0.12%	0.34%
Asian alone (NH)	2	7	20	0.04%	0.14%	0.40%
Native Hawaiian or Pacific Islander alone (NH)	1	0	1	0.02%	0.00%	0.02%
Other race alone (NH)	6	2	12	0.11%	0.04%	0.24%
Mixed race or Multiracial (NH)	22	47	135	0.42%	0.91%	2.73%
Hispanic or Latino (any race)	53	78	142	1.00%	1.51%	2.88%
Total	5,278	5,180	4,939	100.00%	100.00%	100.00%

As of the 2020 United States census, there were 4,939 people, 2,097 households, and 1,343 families residing in the city.

As of the census of 2000, there were 5,278 people, 2,012 households, and 1,416 families residing in the city. The population density was 2,486.3 inhabitants per square mile (960.0/km^{2}). There were 2,158 housing units at an average density of 1,016.6 per square mile (392.5/km^{2}). The racial makeup of the city was 45.04% White, 53.98% African American, 0.15% Native American, 0.04% Asian, 0.02% Pacific Islander, 0.27% from other races, and 0.51% from two or more races. Hispanic or Latino of any race were 1.00% of the population.

There were 2,012 households, out of which 30.5% had children under the age of 18 living with them, 39.7% were married couples living together, 25.7% had a female householder with no husband present, and 29.6% were non-families. 26.2% of all households were made up of individuals, and 9.2% had someone living alone who was 65 years of age or older. The average household size was 2.56 and the average family size was 3.09.

In the city, the population was spread out, with 25.5% under the age of 18, 10.1% from 18 to 24, 26.4% from 25 to 44, 22.9% from 45 to 64, and 15.1% who were 65 years of age or older. The median age was 37 years. For every 100 females, there were 84.7 males. For every 100 females age 18 and over, there were 80.1 males.

The median income for a household in the city was $30,254, and the median income for a family was $36,762. Males had a median income of $31,029 versus $22,333 for females. The per capita income for the city was $14,439. About 19.2% of families and 24.2% of the population were below the poverty line, including 34.4% of those under age 18 and 8.5% of those age 65 or over.

== Education ==
West Baton Rouge Parish School Board operates area public schools.

Holy Family School (of the Roman Catholic Diocese of Baton Rouge) is a local private Catholic school for grades pre-K through Eight. It opened on September 5, 1949 with 146 students in Kindergarten through grade 3, with it becoming K-5 in 1950, and with one grade level per subsequent year until it was K-8, with 345 students, in 1953. Its current grade 4-8 building opened in 1961 and its library opened in 1990.

It is in the service area of Baton Rouge Community College.

== Government ==
Henry Watkins Allen statue

After incorporating in 1916, the City of Port Allen operates under the Lawrason Act. The mayor is elected at large. The elected mayor is the city's chief executive officer and responsible for the daily activities and services of the city. The mayor's office includes the chief administrative officer and the chief financial officer.

There are five city council members, with four members elected from single-member districts and one member elected at-large. The council writes policies, adopts ordinances and resolutions, and appoints members to boards and commissions.

=== Mayors ===
- Demetric "Deedy" Slaughter, mayor elected 2012, recalled 2013;
- Lynn Robertson, mayor from 1993 to 2004, and in the interim mayor from December 2013 to May 2014;
- Richard N. Lee, III (D), mayor elected April 5, 2014, re-elected 2016.

== Points of interest ==
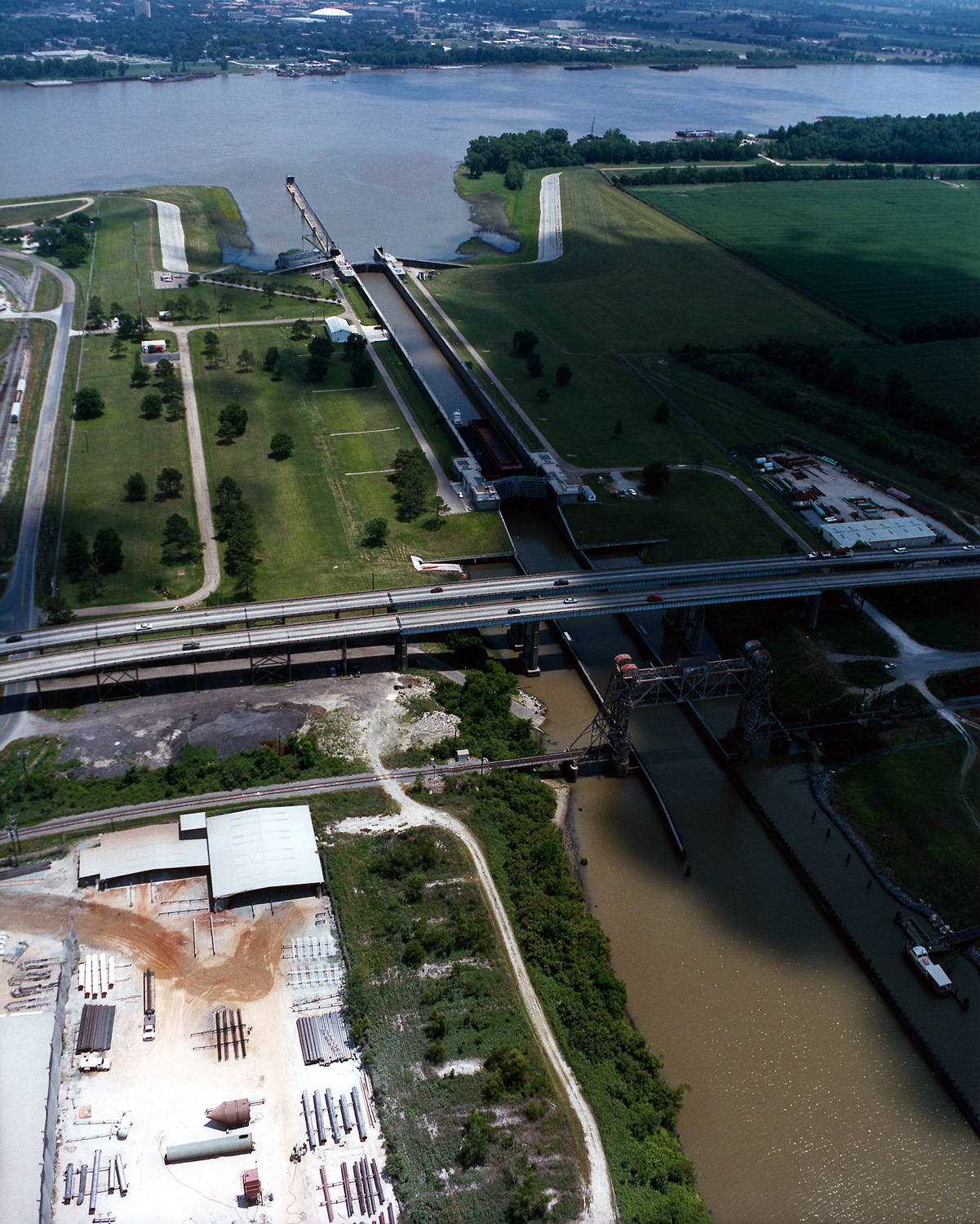
The Port Allen Lock. View is to the east over the Mississippi River.

The West Baton Rouge Museum includes the museum, the c. 1830 Aillet House, a c. 1870s Reconstruction Era worker's cabin, and a c. 1890s cabin decorated to look as it would have during the Civil Rights Era), the c. 1880s Arbroth Plantation Store, the c. 1938 Reed Farm and Ranch Shotgun House, and a reproduction early 20th-century barn.

The City of Port Allen Railroad Depot is a museum depicting the life of railroad workers in the 1940s. It includes a ticket booth, clothing and memorabilia from that era, along with the typewriter originally used at the depot. The 1950 caboose, which is also open for tours, is the only one in Louisiana that is nearly fully restored to its original condition.

The Mississippi Riverfront Development offers a panoramic view of the Mighty Mississippi and Baton Rouge. The area includes a pedestrian promenade with special architectural paving, viewing benches, and ornamental street lighting. On this site a ferry operated between Port Allen and Baton Rouge from 1820 to 1968.

Scott's Cemetery is the burial place of African Americans in West Baton Rouge, dating to the 1850s and slavery times. It is located at the corner of Court and Commerce streets near the Riverfront Development.

The Port of Greater Baton Rouge, located in Port Allen, is the head of deepwater navigation on the Mississippi River, serving barges and ocean-going vessels with international import and export facilities for all types of cargo, from grain to paper products, chemicals, manufactured goods, bulk ores and petroleum products. It is one of the top ten ports in the country. It handles roughly 61 million short tons of cargo each year, has 3,000 feet (910 m) of dock and 550,000 square feet (51,000 m^{2}) of warehouse space. Its facilities include grain elevator storage, molasses, sugar, oil and coffee terminals.

The Port Allen Lock connects the Mississippi River to the Gulf Intracoastal Waterway, shortening the distance to the Gulf of Mexico by approximately 120 miles (190 km). The Lock, a free-floating structure, is the largest of its kind. It serves as a man-made break in the levee. The massive structure has 90-ton doors and 64 feet (20 m) sides. The lock was constructed in 1961 by the U.S. Army Corps of Engineers to replace the historic Plaquemine Lock. The Intracoastal Waterway is an east–west inland waterway shortcut that connects Florida and Texas, eliminating 130 miles (210 km) of shipping distance.

=== Festivals ===
Port Allen Festivals have included the Lagniappe Dulcimer Fete Festival, Port Allen Bonfires on the Mississippi River, SugarFest, West Baton Rouge Parish Fair, Kite Fest Louisiane, and the Oldies but Goodies Fest.

=== Registered historical places ===
The National Register of Historic Places in Port Allen include the Aillet House, the Allendale Plantation Historic District, Monte Vista Plantation House, Poplar Grove Plantation House, Port Allen Middle School, Sandbar Plantation House, and the Smithfield Plantation House.

== Notable people ==
- Henry Watkins Allen, slave owner and planter.
- Tracy Porter, formerly a cornerback for the Chicago Bears
- Arthur T. Prescott, educator who was founding president of Louisiana Tech University in 1894.

== See also ==
- West Baton Rouge Parish
- National Register of Historic Places listings in West Baton Rouge Parish, Louisiana
