= National Register of Historic Places listings in St. Mary Parish, Louisiana =

Location of St. Mary Parish in Louisiana

This is a list of the National Register of Historic Places listings in St. Mary Parish, Louisiana.

This is intended to be a complete list of the properties and districts on the National Register of Historic Places in St. Mary Parish, Louisiana, United States. The locations of National Register properties and districts for which the latitude and longitude coordinates are included below, may be seen in a map.

There are 30 properties and districts listed on the National Register in the parish, one of which is also a National Historic Landmark.

This National Park Service list is complete through NPS recent listings posted March 20, 2026.

== Current listings ==
	Name on the Register	Image	Date listed	Location	City or town	Description
1	Albania Plantation House	Albania Plantation House	January 26, 2001 (#01000007)	1842 Louisiana Highway 182, E. 29°54′12″N 91°38′58″W	Jeanerette vicinity	
2	Alice C Plantation House	Alice C Plantation House	October 24, 2000 (#00001229)	10736 Louisiana Highway 182; 29°46′10″N 91°28′38″W	Garden City	
3	Arlington Plantation House	Arlington Plantation House	October 5, 1982 (#82000457)	56 E. Main St. 29°46′43″N 91°29′35″W	Franklin	
4	Atkinson Memorial Presbyterian Church	Atkinson Memorial Presbyterian Church	March 19, 1991 (#91000248)	214 4th St. 29°41′34″N 91°12′04″W	Morgan City	
5	Birg House		June 24, 1982 (#82004837)	Off Louisiana Highway 182; 29°49′32″N 91°30′58″W	Baldwin vicinity	
6	Bittersweet	Bittersweet	October 28, 1980 (#80004324)	301 Main St. 29°47′19″N 91°29′58″W	Franklin	
7	Boy Scout Troop #1 Log Cabin		September 7, 2001 (#01000944)	601 Adams; 29°47′42″N 91°30′22″W	Franklin	
8	Brubaker House	Brubaker House	September 29, 1995 (#95001133)	1102 2nd St. 29°42′07″N 91°12′42″W	Morgan City	
9	Calumet Plantation House	Calumet Plantation House	October 18, 1984 (#84002859)	West of Patterson on Louisiana Highway 182; 29°42′42″N 91°20′40″W	Patterson vicinity	
10	Joshua B. Cary House	Joshua B. Cary House	August 11, 1982 (#82004677)	U.S. Route 90 and Louisiana Highway 317; 29°45′32″N 91°25′41″W	Centerville	
11	Darby House	Darby House	August 11, 1982 (#82004678)	102 Main St. 29°50′14″N 91°32′38″W	Baldwin	
12	Dixie Plantation House	Dixie Plantation House	May 29, 1987 (#87000851)	11076 Louisiana Highway 182; 29°46′30″N 91°29′19″W	Franklin	
13	Franklin Foundation Hospital		October 10, 2017 (#100001713)	1501 Hospital Ave. 29°48′14″N 91°29′56″W	Franklin	
14	Franklin Historic District	Franklin Historic District	December 29, 1982 (#82000458)	U.S. Route 90; also 600-608 Palfrey St. 29°47′32″N 91°30′10″W	Franklin	Palfrey St. represents a boundary increase of September 15, 2005
15	Grevemberg House	Grevemberg House	June 6, 1980 (#80004325)	Sterling Rd. 29°48′09″N 91°29′48″W	Franklin	
16	Hanson Lumber Company Office	Hanson Lumber Company Office	October 7, 1993 (#93001034)	10400 Louisiana Highway 182; 29°45′56″N 91°27′59″W	Garden City	
17	Hanson Lumber Company Owner's House	Hanson Lumber Company Owner's House	October 7, 1993 (#93001035)	10407 Louisiana Highway 182; 29°45′54″N 91°28′00″W	Garden City	
18	Heaton House	Heaton House	October 30, 1980 (#80004328)	North of Baldwin on Charenton Rd. 29°52′13″N 91°31′26″W	Baldwin vicinity	
19	Idlewild	Idlewild	November 2, 1982 (#82000459)	South of Patterson on Louisiana Highway 182; 29°40′45″N 91°17′34″W	Patterson	
20	Hilaire Lancon House		November 9, 2001 (#01001210)	3934 Irish Bend Rd. 29°50′45″N 91°29′16″W	Franklin vicinity	
21	Mr. Charlie Offshore Oilrig		December 13, 2024 (#100011378)	Atchafalaya River; 29°41′28″N 91°12′35″W	Morgan City	Part of The Rig Museum.
22	Morgan City City Hall and Courthouse	Morgan City City Hall and Courthouse	April 9, 1981 (#81000676)	Corner of Everett and 1st Sts. 29°41′41″N 91°12′31″W	Morgan City	
23	Morgan City Historic District		January 9, 1986 (#86000060)	Roughly bounded by Greenwood St., Arkansas St., Railroad Ave., and Front St. 29°41′43″N 91°12′31″W	Morgan City	
24	Oaklawn Manor	Oaklawn Manor	March 30, 1973 (#73002162)	5 miles northeast of Franklin on Irish Bend Rd. 29°50′58″N 91°28′03″W	Franklin vicinity	Plantation home of U.S. Senator Alexander Porter (1785–1844).
25	Patterson Commercial Historic District	Patterson Commercial Historic District	May 31, 2016 (#16000303)	1106, 1110, 1107, 1109 Main St. 29°41′38″N 91°18′09″W	Patterson	
26	St. Mary's Episcopal Church	St. Mary's Episcopal Church	November 21, 1980 (#80004327)	805 1st St. 29°47′37″N 91°30′08″W	Franklin	
27	Smith House	Smith House	June 6, 1980 (#80004326)	909 2nd St. 29°47′42″N 91°30′13″W	Franklin	
28	Southwest Reef Lighthouse	Southwest Reef Lighthouse	September 12, 1991 (#91001152)	Junction of Bellevue Front and Canton Sts. 29°41′37″N 91°12′59″W	Berwick	
29	Tillandsia	Tillandsia	August 11, 1982 (#82004679)	202 Charenton Rd. 29°50′27″N 91°32′32″W	Baldwin	
30	US Post Office	US Post Office	December 17, 1982 (#82000460)	1st and Everett Sts. 29°41′39″N 91°12′33″W	Morgan City	

== See also ==
- All Saints Episcopal Church (DeQuincy, Louisiana): originally located in St. Mary Parish
- List of National Historic Landmarks in Louisiana
- National Register of Historic Places listings in Louisiana
