= Jerald Hawkins =

American football player (born 1993)

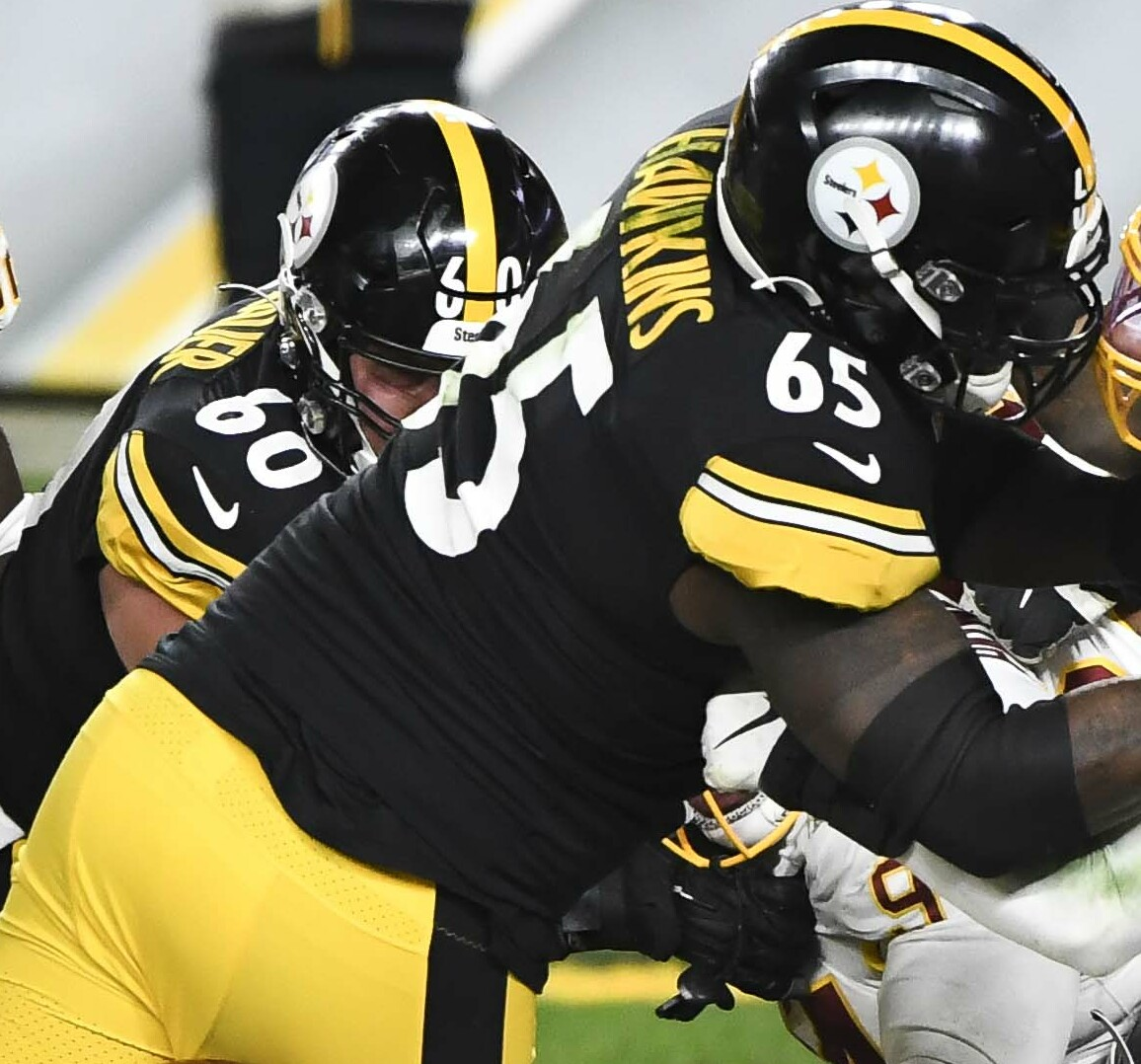
- Hawkins with the Pittsburgh Steelers in 2020

Profile
- Position: Offensive tackle

Personal information
- Born: October 16, 1993 (age 33); Baldwin, Louisiana, U.S.
- Listed height: 6 ft 6 in (1.98 m)
- Listed weight: 305 lb (138 kg)

Career information
- High school: West St. Mary (Baldwin)
- College: LSU
- NFL draft: 2016: 4th round, 123rd overall pick

Career history
- Pittsburgh Steelers (2016–2018); Tampa Bay Buccaneers (2019); Houston Texans (2020)*; Pittsburgh Steelers (2020); New England Patriots (2021)*; New Orleans Saints (2021)*; Saskatchewan Roughriders (2023–2024)
- * Offseason or practice squad member only

Career NFL statistics
- Games played: 19
- Games started: 1
- Stats at Pro Football Reference

Jerald Lee Hawkins (born October 16, 1993) is an American professional football offensive tackle. He played college football at Louisiana State University, and was selected by the Pittsburgh Steelers in the fourth round of the 2016 NFL draft. He has also played for the Tampa Bay Buccaneers, and been a member of the Houston Texans, New England Patriots and New Orleans Saints.

== Early life ==
Hawkins attended West St. Mary High School in Baldwin, Louisiana. He played both offensive and defensive tackle. He committed to Louisiana State University (LSU) to play college football.

== College career ==
Hawkins was a three-year starter at offensive tackle for LSU from 2013 to 2015. He started at right tackle his first two years before switching to left for his junior year. After his junior year he entered the 2016 NFL draft.

== Professional career ==
=== Pre-draft ===
Entering the 2016 NFL draft, Hawkins was projected by the majority of NFL analysts and scouts to be a second or third round pick. He received the invitation to the NFL Combine and completed all the required combine drills and positional drills. On March 14, 2016, he participated at LSU's pro day and chose to only perform the three-cone drill and positional drills for team representatives and scouts. He was ranked the ninth best offensive tackle prospect available in the draft by NFLDraftScout.com.

Pre-draft measurables
| Height | Weight | Arm length | Hand span | 40-yard dash | 10-yard split | 20-yard split | 20-yard shuttle | Three-cone drill | Vertical jump | Broad jump | Bench press |
|---|---|---|---|---|---|---|---|---|---|---|---|
| 6 ft 5 5/8 in (1.97 m) | 305 lb (138 kg) | 34 1/4 in (0.87 m) | 9 5/8 in (0.24 m) | 5.23 s | 1.92 s | 3.09 s | 4.89 s | 8.04 s | 23.5 in (0.60 m) | 8 ft 4 in (2.54 m) | 23 reps |
All values from NFL Combine/Pro Day

=== Pittsburgh Steelers (first stint) ===
Hawkins was selected by the Pittsburgh Steelers in the fourth round (123rd overall) of the 2016 NFL draft. On June 2, 2016, Hawkins signed a four-year, $2.87 million contract with a signing bonus of $530,488. On August 28, 2016, he was placed on injured reserve by the Steelers after suffering a shoulder injury during a joint practice with the Detroit Lions.

He entered training camp in 2017 competing for a backup offensive tackle position with Matt Feiler, Chris Hubbard, and Keavon Milton. Hawkins was named the backup left tackle behind Alejandro Villanueva to begin the regular season.

On November 26, 2017, Hawkins made his professional debut against the Green Bay Packers.

On May 30, 2018, Hawkins suffered a torn quad during organized team activities. He was officially placed on injured reserve on June 5, 2018, ruling him out for the 2018 season.

=== Tampa Bay Buccaneers ===
On August 31, 2019, Hawkins was traded to the Tampa Bay Buccaneers along with the Steelers' seventh round pick in the 2021 NFL draft in exchange for the Buccaneers' sixth round pick in the 2021 draft.

=== Houston Texans ===
On August 10, 2020, Hawkins was signed by the Houston Texans. He was released on September 5, 2020, and signed to the practice squad the next day.

=== Pittsburgh Steelers (second stint) ===
On September 16, 2020, Hawkins was signed away from the Texans' practice squad by the Pittsburgh Steelers after Pittsburgh's starting right tackle Zach Banner suffered a season-ending ACL injury in Week 1. Hawkins was placed on the reserve/COVID-19 list by the Steelers on November 10, 2020, and activated on November 14. He was placed back on the COVID-19 list on November 27, and activated on December 7.

=== New England Patriots ===
On July 30, 2021, Hawkins signed with the New England Patriots. He was released on August 16.

=== New Orleans Saints ===
On December 8, 2021, Hawkins was signed to the New Orleans Saints practice squad. He signed a reserve/future contract with the Saints on January 11, 2022. He was placed on injured reserve on August 6, 2022. He was released on August 24.

=== Saskatchewan Roughriders ===
On December 8, 2022, Hawkins signed with the Saskatchewan Roughriders of the Canadian Football League (CFL). He started one game for the Roughriders in 2023. He was placed on the reserve/suspended list on May 12, 2024, and remained there until February 11, 2025, when he became a free agent at the end of his CFL contract.
