= Grevemberg House =

Historic house in Louisiana, United States

- U.S. National Register of Historic Places
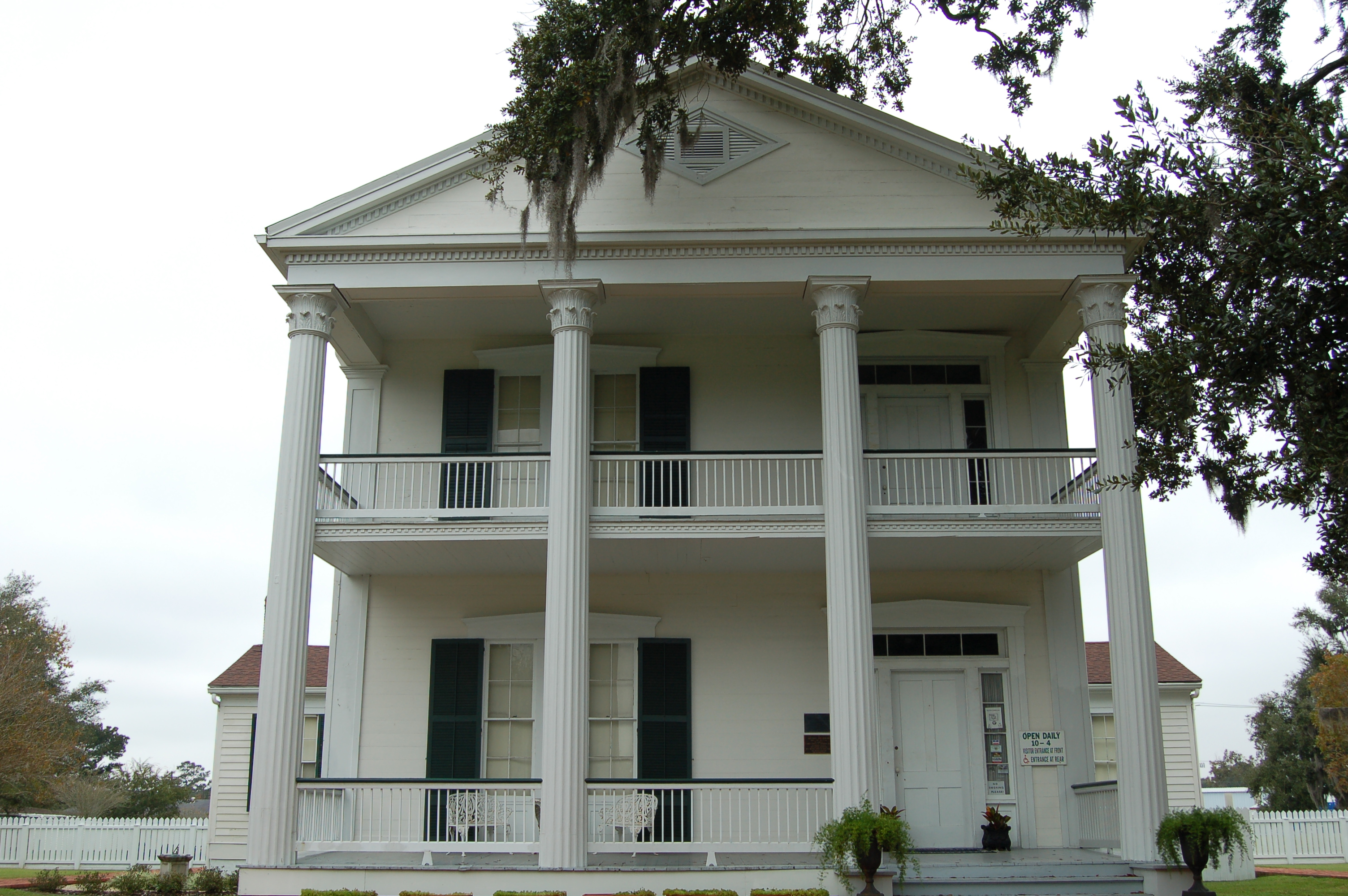

- Location within Louisiana Location within the United States
- Location: Sterling Road, Franklin, Louisiana
- Coordinates: 29.802530°N 91.496953°W
- Area: less than one acre
- Built: 1851
- Architectural style: Greek Revival
- NRHP reference No.: 80004325
- Added to NRHP: June 6, 1980

The Grevemberg House is a historic mansion in Franklin, Louisiana, U.S.. It was built in 1851, a decade prior to the American Civil War. It was designed in the Greek Revival architectural style. It has been listed on the National Register of Historic Places since June 6, 1980.

The house is located in Franklin's City Park, on Sterling Road. It was moved to this location.

== See also ==
- Albania Plantation House: owned by the same family
- National Register of Historic Places listings in St. Mary Parish, Louisiana
