= Berwick Bay Bridge =

Coordinates: 29.6925°N 91.2125°W

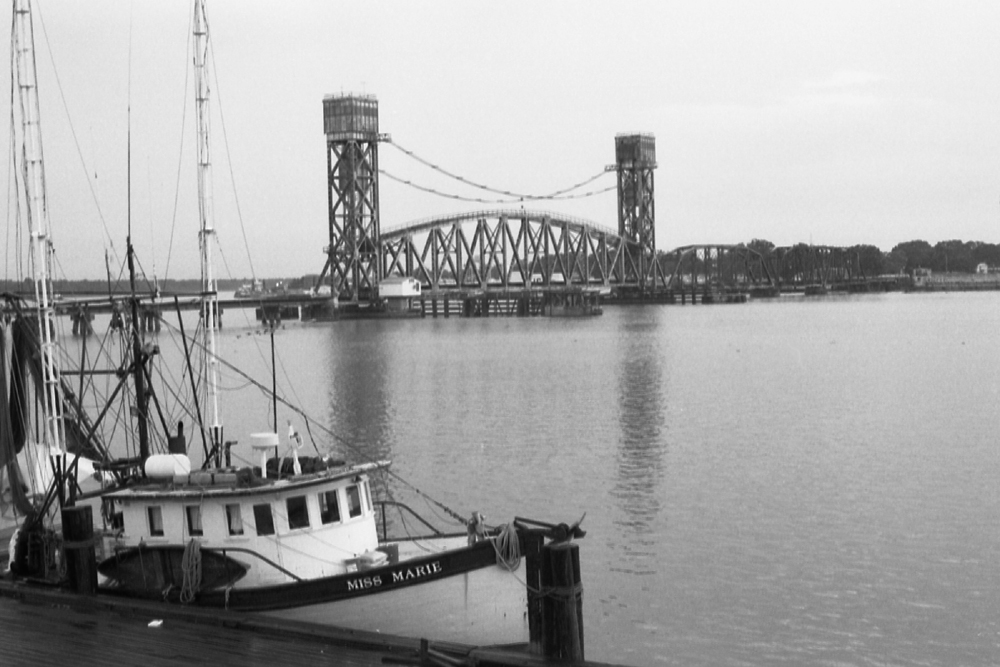
- Carries: Lafayette Subdivision (1 track)
- Crosses: Atchafalaya River
- Locale: Berwick and Morgan City, Louisiana
- Maintained by: LaDOTD
- ID number: SPRR Bridge

Characteristics
- Design: Vertical lift bridge

Location
- Interactive map of Berwick Bay Bridge

The Berwick Bay Bridge is a vertical lift bridge in the U.S. state of Louisiana which carries the BNSF Railway over the Atchafalaya River between Berwick and Morgan City. The bridge is primarily used for freight, but Amtrak runs the Sunset Limited three times weekly per direction over the line.
