= Alice C Plantation House =

Historic plantation house

- U.S. National Register of Historic Places
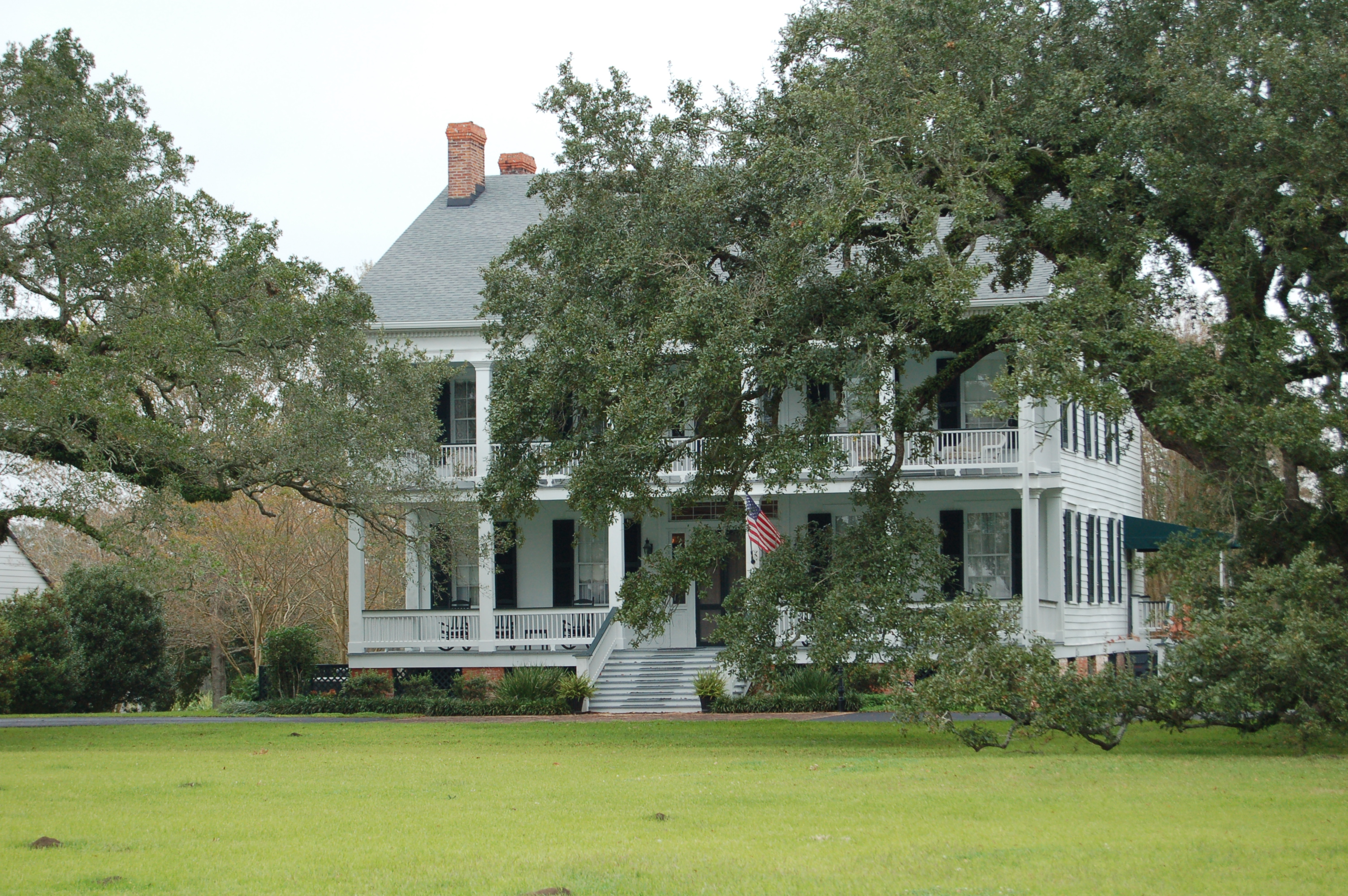
- Alice C Plantation House in 2009
- Location: 10736 Hwy 182, Franklin, Louisiana, U.S.
- Area: approx. 4.5 acres
- Built: c. 1850
- Architectural style: Greek Revival, French Creole
- NRHP reference No.: 00001229
- Added to NRHP: October 24, 2000

The Alice C Plantation House, also known simply as the Alice Plantation House, is a historic former plantation house, located in Garden City near Franklin in St. Mary Parish, Louisiana.

== History ==
The Alice C Plantation House was designed mainly in the Greek Revival architecture style, with French Creole influences, and built using brick, weatherboard made of cypress, and an asphalt tile roof. The house is two and half stories tall and was made with "briquette entre poteaux" (a French Creole architecture term for brick infill between the framing).

The home was initially built for Jotham Hulbert Bedell (1807–1859), who ran a sugar plantation and a sugar mill on the property. The sugar mill was removed in the 1950s. The subsequent owners of the home were Alice and John Calder.

The home was featured in the film Easy Rider (1969).

== See also ==
- List of plantations in Louisiana
- National Register of Historic Places listings in St. Mary Parish, Louisiana
