= Ship Shoal Light =

Lighthouse in Louisiana, US

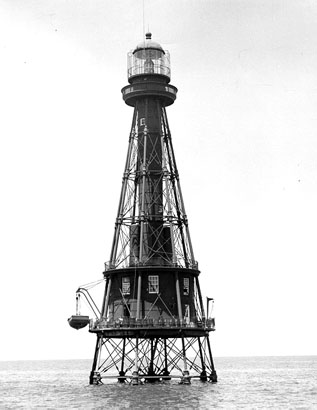
- Undated photograph of Ship Shoal Light (USCG)
- Location: southwest of Isles Dernieres
- Coordinates: 28.9145°N 91.0711°W

Tower
- Foundation: screw-pile
- Construction: cast-iron
- Automated: 1929
- Height: 125 feet (38 m)
- Shape: skeletal tower with circular house at base

Light
- First lit: 1859
- Deactivated: 1965
- Focal height: 105 feet (32 m)
- Lens: second-order Fresnel lens
- Characteristic: QF W

The Ship Shoal Light is a screw-pile lighthouse located in the Gulf of Mexico southwest of the Isles Dernieres (Last Island) off the coast of Louisiana. It is currently abandoned.

The light house is, by the 2020s known as the most endangered lighthouse on the Louisiana register of Historic places, and the town of Berwick has been trying to save it by relocating it.

== History ==
Ship Shoal (known as Ship Island Shoal in early maps) is a bar running east–west in the open waters of the gulf. The Louisiana State Legislature petitioned the U.S. Congress for a light to be erected on this hazard in 1848, but instead of a fixed tower, a lightship was provided instead. This vessel, the Pleasonton, was named after Stephen Pleasonton, who was in charge of the lighthouse service at the time. It exhibited a pair of red lanterns and took station on December 29, 1849.

Pleasonton's tenure was then drawing to a close, and when the Lighthouse Board was formed in 1852, they requested funding for an iron tower to replace the lightship. Design and construction were protracted, and a total of $103,000 was spent before the light was erected in 1859. The tower was patterned on those being built along the Florida shore, with a ring of eight piles driven into the bottom and surmounted by an octagonal skeleton tower 125 feet (38 m) in height. The keeper's dwelling was a cylindrical iron house on a platform near the base of the tower. A second order Fresnel lens was provided; during the Civil War Confederate forces raided the tower and carried away the lens and lantern glass, eventually removing them to St. Martinville, but they were recovered at the end of the war. In the meantime the tower was recaptured by the Union and a new lens mounted.

Shortly after the war the Lighthouse Board became aware that keepers at the light were becoming ill. An 1866 investigation determined that the problem was red lead paint in the light's cisterns, which was poisoning the water. The paint was stripped and the tanks relined with coal tar.

The tower survived many hurricanes, but over time the tower developed a considerable tilt, which placement of granite blocks around the footings in 1896 was not sufficient to remedy. The beacon was automated in 1929 and discontinued in 1965, and the tower abandoned, though quick flashing lights were set on the structure to warn of the obstruction. The town of Berwick plans to move the tower to a park in the town, adjoining the Southwest Reef Light which has already been relocated there, but Ship Shoal Light remains in the gulf for now.
