= Point Au Fer Reef Light =

Lighthouse in Louisiana, US

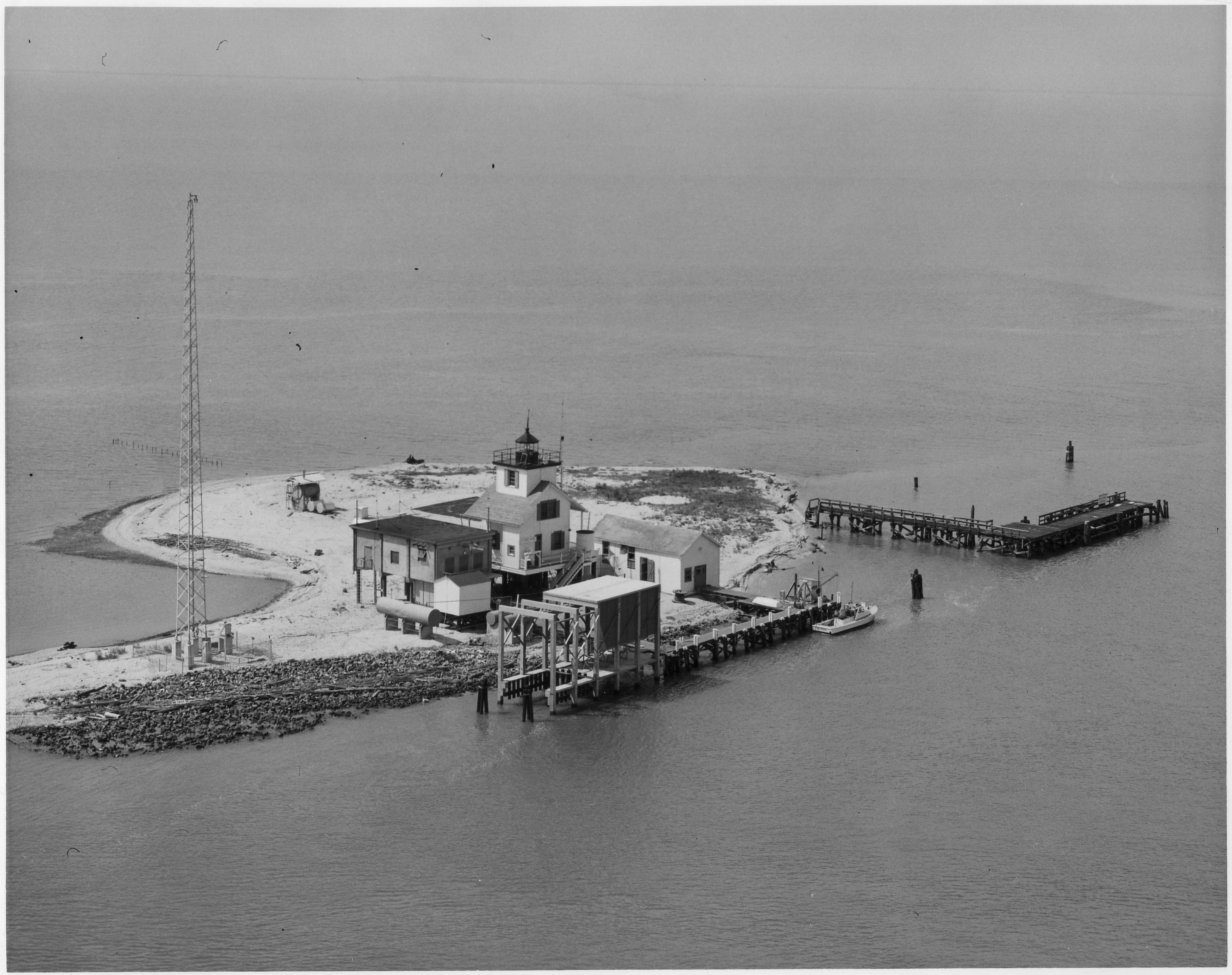
- 1963
- Location: Atchafalaya Bay, Louisiana
- Coordinates: 29°22′20″N 91°23′3″W

Tower
- Constructed: 1916 (original house)
- Foundation: Pile with platform
- Construction: Wood
- Shape: Square tower on 1½ story keeper's house
- Markings: White with black lantern
- Fog signal: Bell, then horn

Light
- First lit: 1975 (current skeleton tower)
- Focal height: 54 feet (16 m)
- Lens: 4th order Fresnel lens
- Characteristic: Flashing white 6s (c1965)

The Point Au Fer Reef Light was a lighthouse built in 1916 on Eugene Island in Atchafalaya Bay, Louisiana to mark a new channel across Point Au Feu Reef. It replaced Southwest Reef Light as the entrance light for the Atchafalaya River. The light was deactivated and replaced by a skeleton tower in 1975. The Coast Guard then offered it to the South Lafourche Cultural and Historical Society, which declined, so the Coast Guard burned it down.

== Gallery ==
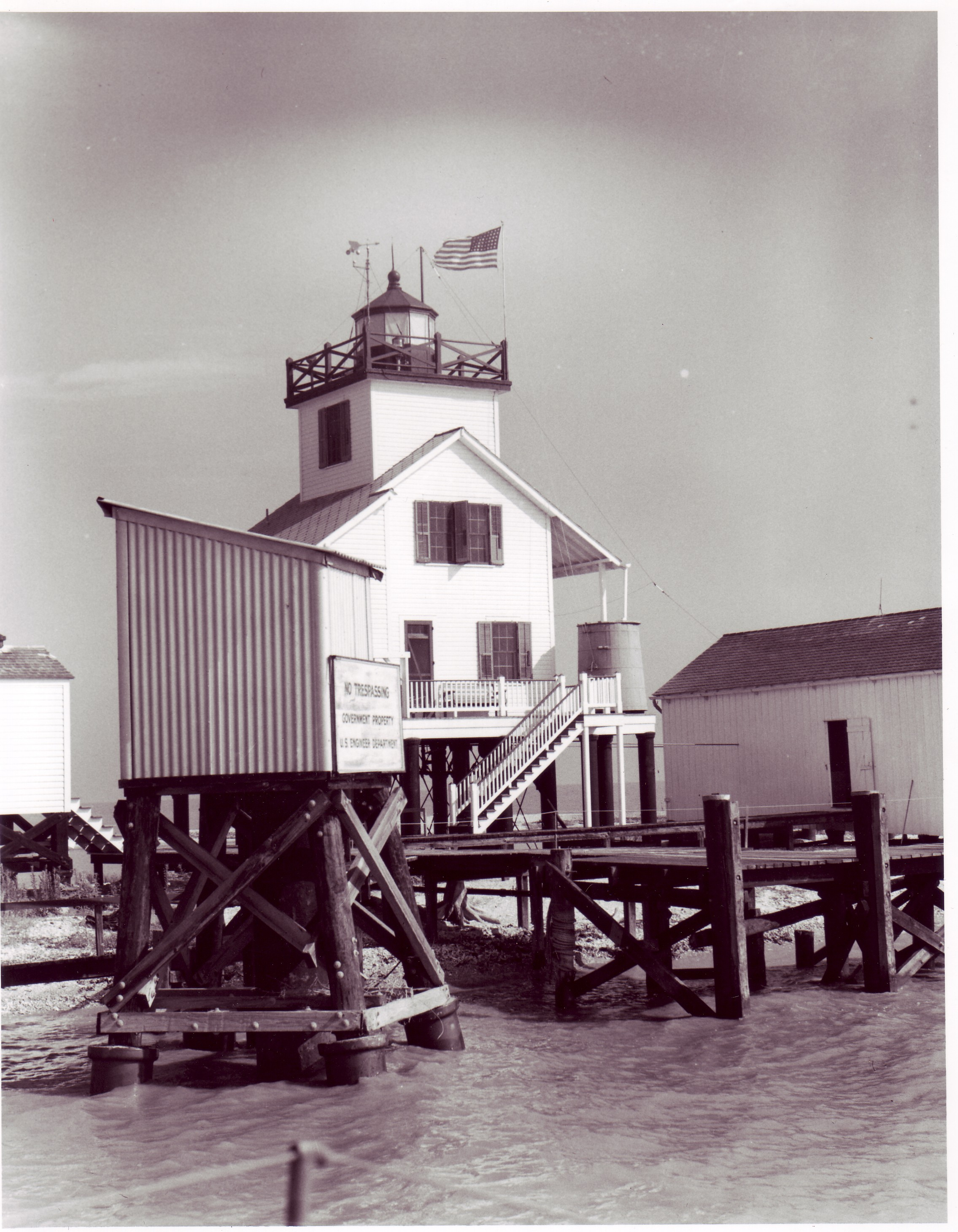
1945

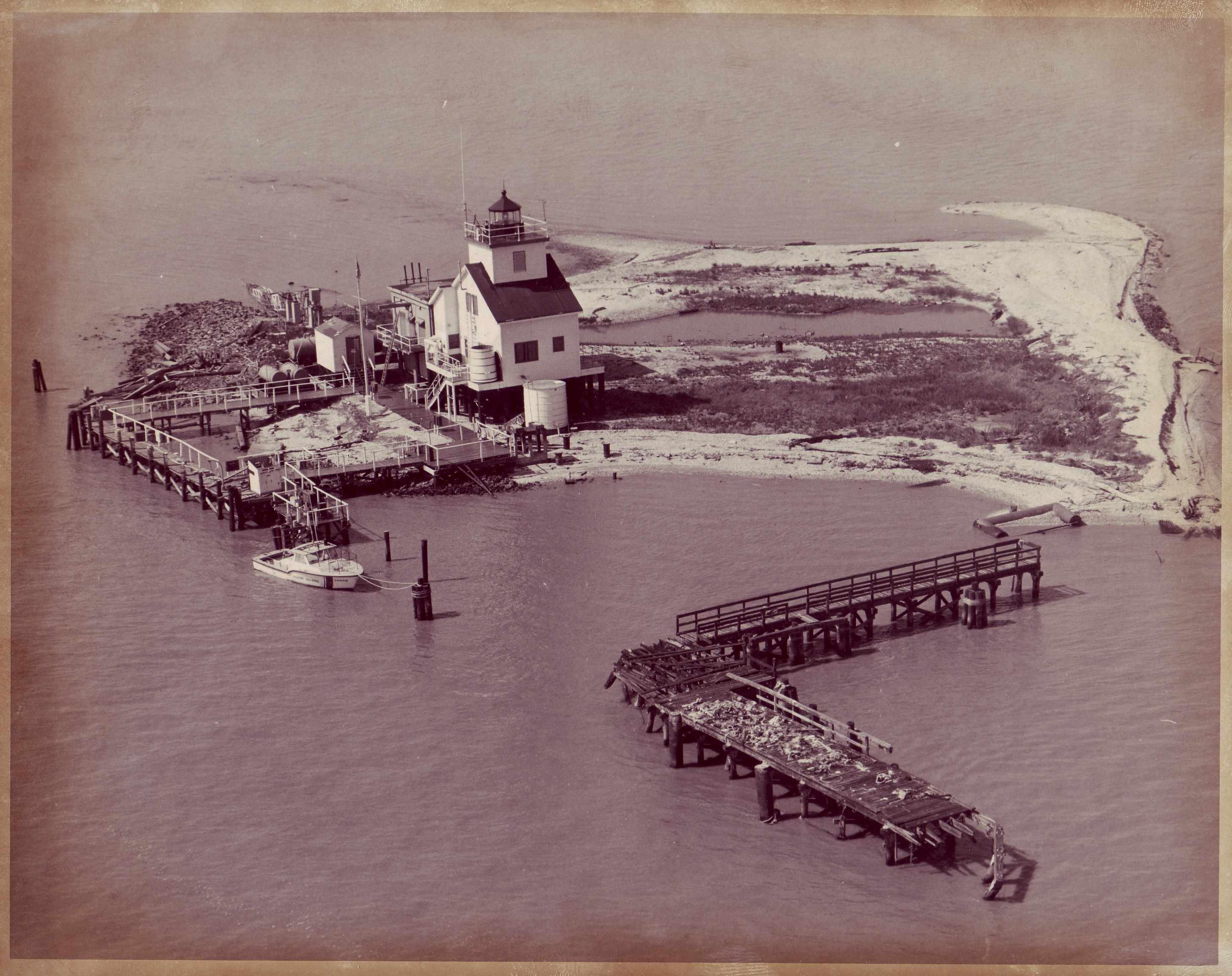
1974
