= Dixie Plantation =

Historic house in Louisiana, United States

- Dixie Plantation House
- U.S. National Register of Historic Places
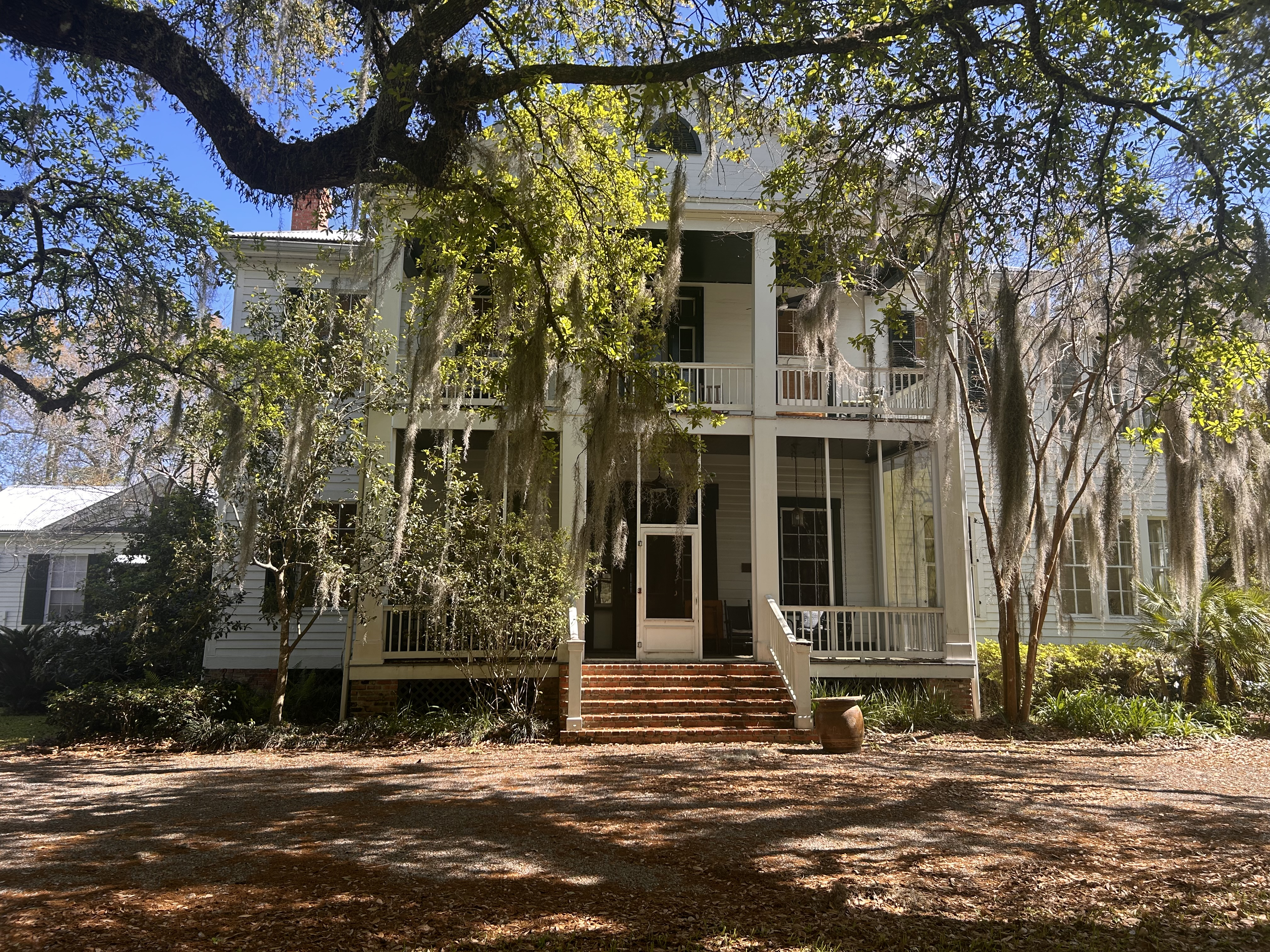
- Dixie Plantation House in March of 2026

- Location within Louisiana Location within the United States
- Location: 11076 Highway 182; Franklin, Louisiana, United States
- Coordinates: 29°46′30″N 91°29′19″W
- Area: 4.5 acres (1.8 ha)
- Built: c. 1835
- Architectural style: Greek Revival, Central-Passage
- NRHP reference No.: 87000851
- Added to NRHP: May 29, 1987

The Dixie Plantation is a Southern plantation with a historic house located in Franklin, Louisiana, USA. It is owned by the College of Charleston Foundation.

== History ==
The two-story mansion was built for Hilarie Carlin circa 1835. It was acquired by Richard A. Wilkins in 1846. Wilkins's sister, Sally, married George Pickett in this house in 1851; he later served as a general in the Confederate States Army during the American Civil War of 1861–1865.

In 1883, it was purchased by Murphy J. Foster, who served as the 31st Governor of Louisiana from 1892 to 1900 and focused on voter disenfranchisement. The house was inherited by his granddaughter, Mrs Langfitt Bowditch Wilby.

== Architectural significance ==
It has been listed on the National Register of Historic Places since May 29, 1987.

== Copyright litigation ==
Benjamin Ham, a professional photographer, was held liable for photos he took of Dixie Plantation without permission of the owner, and for selling the photos.
