= St. Mary's Episcopal Church (Franklin, Louisiana) =

Historic church in Louisiana, United States

- U.S. National Register of Historic Places
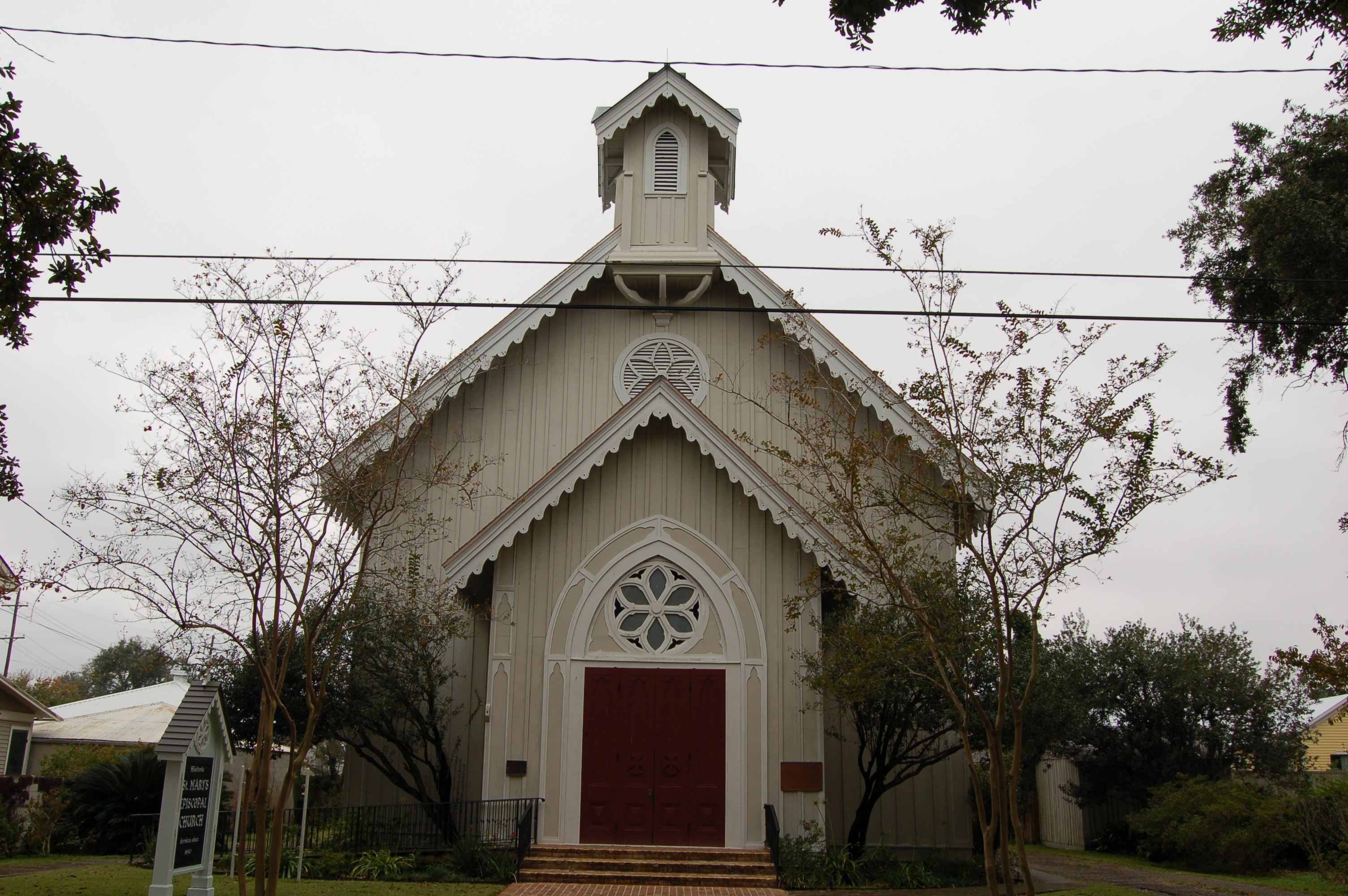

- Location within Louisiana Location within the United States
- Location: 805 1st St., Franklin, Louisiana
- Coordinates: 29°47′37″N 91°30′8″W
- Area: .25 acres (0.10 ha)
- Built: 1871-72
- Architectural style: Gothic Revival
- NRHP reference No.: 80004327
- Added to NRHP: November 21, 1980

The St. Mary's Episcopal Church in Franklin, Louisiana, United States, is a historic church at 805 1st Street. Designed by New Orleans architect James Freret for R.W. Micou, it was advertised by the Lhote Lumber Company in its 1883 Buyers' Guide. The cathedral reported 66 members in 2022 and 45 members in 2023; no membership statistics were reported in 2024 parochial reports. Plate and pledge income reported for the congregation in 2024 was $87,260. Average Sunday attendance (ASA) in 2024 was 24 persons.

The current Gothic Revival church building was built in 1872 and added to the National Register of Historic Places in 1980. A parish of the Episcopal Diocese of Louisiana, St. Mary's also maintains the historic Trowbridge House just across the street.

It was deemed "significant in the area of architecture as a fine example of a mid-nineteenth century Gothic Revival church. Although this was a style for church architecture which flourished in the eastern states, St. Mary's is one of only about 12 extant good examples in Louisiana."

The church was organized in 1846 and was accepted into its diocese in 1847.

St. Mary's Church holds regular Christian formation programs and Sunday worship at 10:30. The Rev. Stephen Crawford is rector.
