= Albania Plantation House =

Historic house in Louisiana, United States

- Albania Mansion
- U.S. National Register of Historic Places
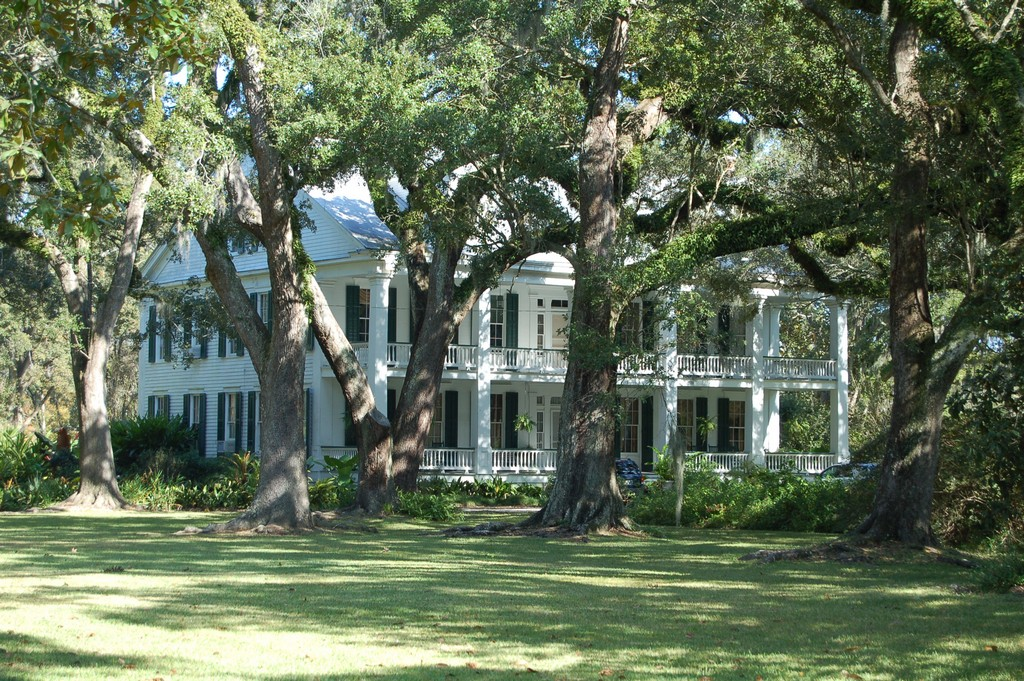

- Location within Louisiana Location within the United States
- Nearest city: Jeanerette, Louisiana
- Coordinates: 29°54′12″N 91°38′58″W
- Area: 1.7 acres (0.69 ha)
- Built: 1855
- Architectural style: Greek Revival, Italianate
- NRHP reference No.: 01000007
- Added to NRHP: January 26, 2001

Albania Plantation is a plantation house located on the Bayou Teche in St. Mary Parish, Louisiana right outside of the town of Jeanerette, Louisiana. The home was built between 1837 and 1842 by Charles Alexandre Grevemberg, who operated a sugar plantation based on slave labor on the surrounding 6,500 acres (2,600 ha). The home is listed on the National Register of Historic Places.

In the slave schedules of the 1850 census, Grevemberg was recorded as owning 183 slaves. In the 1860 slave schedules, Grevemberg's widow was listed as owning 211 slaves.

After Charles Alexandre Grevemberg's death at Albania in 1851, his wife, Euphemie Fuselier (d. 1886), managed the plantation. Records of the sugar crops made in Louisiana 1859–1860 shows Mrs. Charles Grevemberg producing 475 hogsheads of sugar on the Bayou Teche.

Samuel and Isaac Delgado acquired the property in 1885. Isaac Delgado bequeathed it to the City of New Orleans in order to establish the Delgado Vocational Institute to benefit the underprivileged. The city of New Orleans operated the sugar plantation through the Delgado-Albania Plantation Commission. This included a full scale sugar processing facility which was managed by the Allain family until 1931 and then the Munson family until 1957. Those families lived in the house where they raised their families while running the plantation business.

In 1957 the City of New Orleans sold the plantation house and some of the surrounding acreage at public auction. It was acquired by Emily Cyr Bridges, who restored Albania Plantation Home and opened it to the public showcasing her well-known collection. Miss Emily was known to travel the countryside knocking on doors to add to her collection of Southern plantation furniture and Acadian artifacts, at a time before such objects were highly prized.

Miss Emily was the daughter of Paul N. Cyr, Lieutenant Governor of Louisiana from 1928 to 1931, under Governor Huey Long. In one of the more colorful Long-era incidents, Cyr had himself sworn in as governor in October 1931, stating that Long had vacated the office when he was elected U.S. Senator. Long called out the National Guard and the State Police to bar Cyr from the Governor's Mansion. Miss Emily shared her father's disdain for Huey Long, and banned his name from being spoken at Albania.

Never a conventional woman, Miss Emily was a pioneer aviator who flew patrol missions over the Louisiana coast as a member of the Civil Air Patrol during World War II.

In Miss Emily's heyday at Albania she loved to entertain on the galleries; her coterie included artist-in-residence Lucius Lacour. In her later years Miss Emily became reclusive, rarely receiving guests and never leaving her beloved Albania.

The home was owned by Hunt Slonem, the celebrated New York artist who bought the house for about $625,000 (~$961,798 in 2024) in 2005. In 2023, he sold the home to Liz and Terry Creel, Louisiana residents who had tried to buy the home from Emily Cyr some twenty years prior. To this day, the City of New Orleans continues to own the sugar cane land which is leased to local farmers. Proceeds are used by the Delgado Albania Plantation Commission to fund capital projects at what is now known as Delgado Community College.

== See also ==
- Grevemberg House
- National Register of Historic Places listings in St. Mary Parish, Louisiana
