= Oaklawn Manor =

Historic house in Louisiana, United States

- U.S. National Register of Historic Places
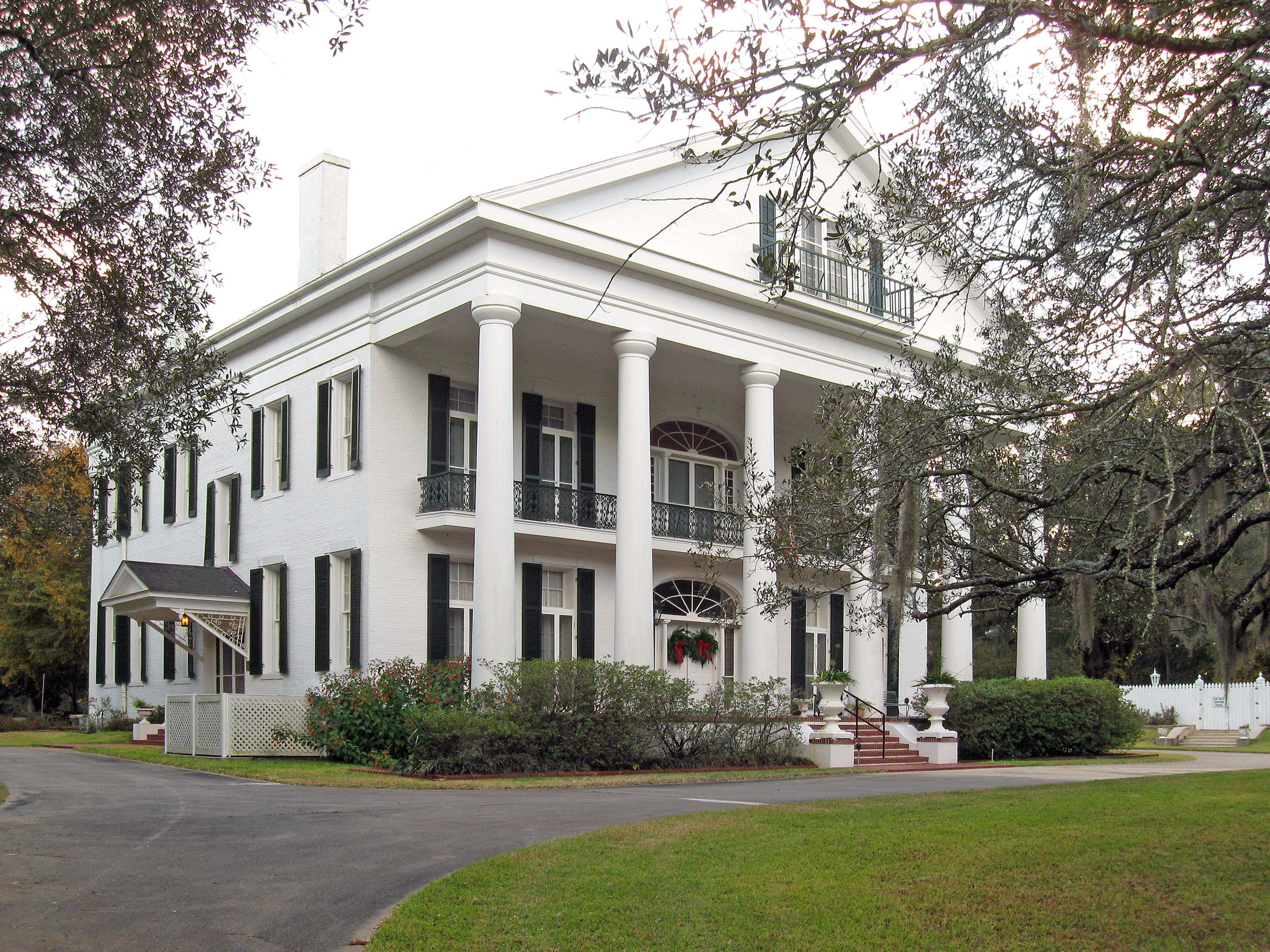

- Location within Louisiana Location within the United States
- Nearest city: Franklin, Louisiana
- Coordinates: 29°50′58″N 91°28′3″W
- Area: 75 acres (30 ha)
- Built: 1837
- Architectural style: Greek Colonial
- NRHP reference No.: 73002162
- Added to NRHP: March 30, 1973

Oaklawn Manor is a plantation house located on the Bayou Teche in St. Mary Parish, Louisiana, United States, just outside of Franklin. The house was built by Alexander Porter about 1837, and sold by his widow Mary Walton Porter following the Civil War as she was unable to operate the sugar plantation without slave labor. The house is listed on the National Register of Historic Places.

== See also ==
- National Register of Historic Places listings in St. Mary Parish, Louisiana
