= Franklin Historic District (Franklin, Louisiana) =

Historic district in Louisiana, United States

- U.S. National Register of Historic Places
- U.S. Historic district
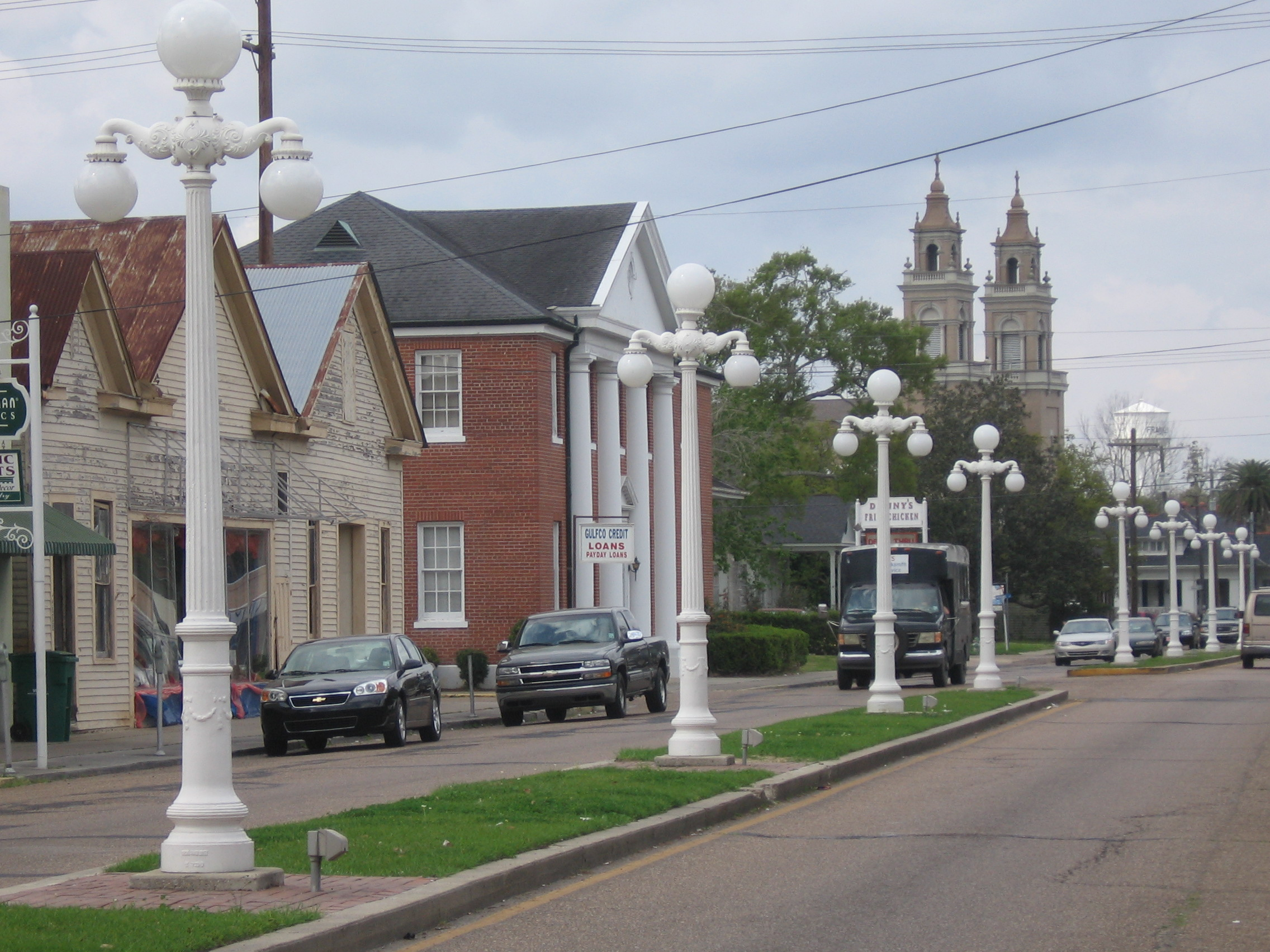
- Main Street in 2007

- Location within Louisiana Location within the United States
- Location: Bounded roughly by Main St. and Teche Dr. on the east, Adams St. and Iberia St. on the north, Anderson and Second St. on the west, St. John, Willow, and Clark Sts. on the south, Franklin, Louisiana
- Area: 155 acres (63 ha) (original) less than one acre (increase)
- Architectural style: Greek Revival, Stick/Eastlake, Queen Anne
- NRHP reference No.: 82000458, 05001042
- Added to NRHP: December 29, 1982 (original); September 15, 2005 (increase)

The Franklin Historic District in Franklin, Louisiana was established by the listing of a 155-acre (63 ha) area as a historic district on the National Register of Historic Places in 1982. The listing then included 327 contributing buildings and one other contributing structure. The district was expanded in 2005 to add seven more contributing buildings at 600-608 Palfrey Street. The modified district included 334 contributing buildings and 89 non-contributing intrusions.

The district includes eight blocks of Main Street through Franklin, which runs north–south. It includes five blocks of east-west Adams Street. It is an irregular shape bounded roughly by Main St. and Teche Dr. on the east, Adams St. and Iberia St. on the north, Anderson and Second St. on the west, St. John, Willow, and Clark Sts. on the south. (Note: The district is described as "US 90" in the National Park Service's NRIS database, but U.S. Highway 90 does not in fact currently run through the district. Presumably it formerly did run up Main St., but was realigned to the west to avoid running through the downtown.)

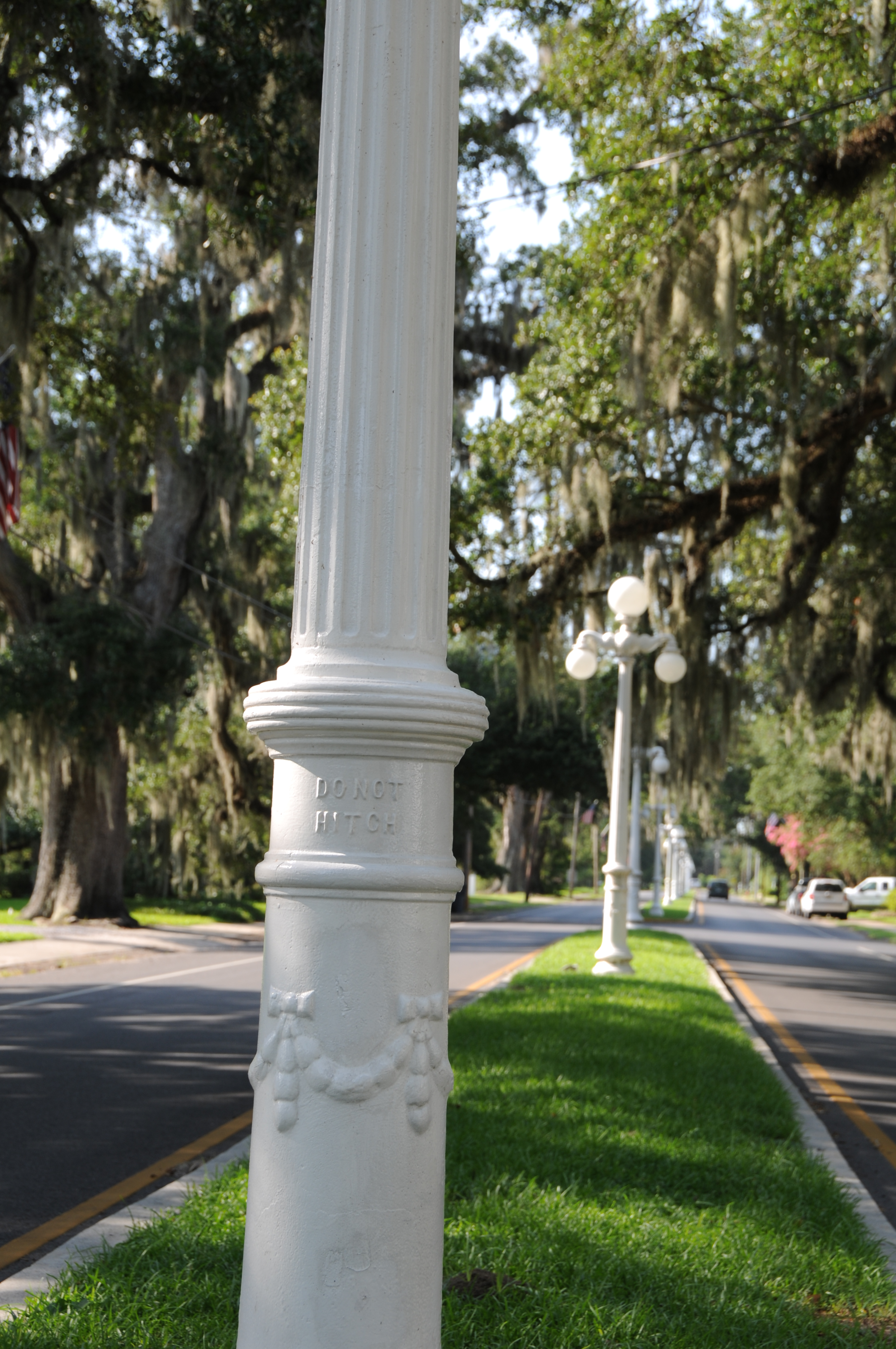
Do not hitch your horses to lampposts on Main St.

The district includes Greek Revival, Stick/Eastlake, and Queen Anne architecture.
