= Centerville School =

Location
- 9225 Highway 182 West; Centerville, (St. Mary Parish), Louisiana 70522; United States; 29.7590°N 91.4296°W

Information
- Type: Public high school
- School district: St. Mary Parish School Board
- Principal: Jared Ross
- Staff: 48.36 (FTE)
- Enrollment: 466 (2023-2024)
- Student to teacher ratio: 9.64
- Colors: Purple and gold
- Mascot: Bulldog
- Nickname: Bulldogs
- Website: chs.stmaryk12.net

Centerville School is a K-12 school in Centerville, unincorporated St. Mary Parish, Louisiana, United States. It is a part of St. Mary Parish School Board and is the only full K-12 public school in the parish. In addition to Centerville it also serves Garden City and Ricohoc.
