= Hunt Slonem =

American painter

- Born: Hunt Slonim; July 18, 1951 (age 75); Kittery, Maine, United States
- Education: Tulane University, Skowhegan School of Painting and Sculpture
- Known for: Painting, Sculpture, Printmaking
- Movement: Neo-Expressionism
- Awards: Elizabeth T. Greenshields Foundation (Grant; 1976); MacDowell Fellowship (1983, 1984, 1985); Ragdale Foundation (1983); The National Endowment for the Arts Grant; (1991); Stars of Design Award (2009)
- Website: Huntslonem.com

Hunt Slonem (born Hunt Slonim; July 18, 1951) is an American painter, sculptor, and printmaker. He is best known for his Neo-Expressionist paintings of butterflies, bunnies, and his tropical birds, often based on a personal aviary in which he has been keeping from 30 to over 100 live birds of various species. Slonem's works are included in many important museum collections all over the world; he exhibits regularly at both public and private venues, and he has received numerous honors and awards.

== Early life ==
Hunt Slonem was born in Kittery, Maine, in an upper middle class Jewish family, the eldest of four children. His father was a Navy officer, and mother – a homemaker who spent much of her time doing volunteer work. As a result of his father's military career, Slonem's family moved around as frequently as every two to three years. He lived in Hawaii, Virginia, Connecticut, California and Washington State. Slonem's grandmother was a Tennessee native who married a Minnesota-born amateur artist and educator who became the Superintendent of Public Schools in Duluth, Minnesota. It was Slonem's grandfather who always encouraged young Hunt to paint. "I grew up around painting, and my parents dabbled in painting themselves. I was given paints as a child, and I wanted to be a painter from first grade onwards," Slonem told the online magazine Art Interview. His younger brother, Jeffrey Slonim, is a prolific journalist, and contributing editor of the Interview Magazine, and his cousin is the best-selling author Tama Janowitz.

After completing school, which included living in Nicaragua as an exchange student when he was 16 years old, Slonem commenced undergraduate studies at Vanderbilt University in Nashville, Tennessee. He then spent about six months of his sophomore year at the University of the Americas in San Andrés Cholula, Puebla, Mexico, but later graduated with a Bachelor of Arts degree in Painting and Art History from Tulane University in New Orleans, Louisiana. He also took courses at the Skowhegan School of Painting and Sculpture in Maine, where he was exposed to such influential artists from the New York area as Louise Nevelson, Alex Katz, Alice Neel, Richard Estes, Jack Levine, and Al Held. During that period, Slonem altered the "i" to an "e" in his family name. He moved to New York in 1973 to further his art practice, and Manhattan had become his consistent base ever since.

== Career ==
I would say my whole life could be summed up by the word 'exotica'.

— Hunt Slonem

Hunt Slonem's artistic career began in New York, in the late 1970s. When he first came to Manhattan, in 1973, he was hired by the Department of Social Services to teach painting to senior citizens. He was unhappy at his job and seriously considered moving to Amsterdam when, unexpectedly, in 1975, he got a call from artist Janet Fish who offered him her studio for the summer. That telephone call turned Slonem's life around. Shortly afterwards, In 1976, Hunt Slonem received a painting grant from the Elizabeth Greenshields Foundation in Montreal, Quebec, Canada, and began painting in earnest. His first solo show was held at New York's Harold Reed Gallery in 1977, followed by a major exhibition at the prestigious Fischbach Gallery. As Slonem's career progressed, he was introduced to people like Andy Warhol, Liza Minnelli, Sylvia Miles, and Truman Capote. Through Jeffrey Slonim, who would later serve as an usher at Andy Warhol's funeral, he also met and befriended the Belgian-born actress Monique van Vooren, the star of Warhol's film Flesh for Frankenstein. He soon became a habitué of New York's trendiest hot spots and an active participant in the city's burgeoning art scene.

Slonem's move to New York had a profound influence on his development as an artist. According to The New York Times, he fell in love with "a very particular kind of New York life, one most people can only fantasize about. But people this determinedly unusual do exist here, and that is one of the city's surest charms. They feed off the city and the city feeds off them." Novelist Tama Janowitz put it succinctly, saying, "His pictures are the subtext of Manhattan, an imaginary, vivid and grotesquely evocative world that bubbles beneath the paved-over, gray city of New York which he physically inhabits -- a city where people have come from all over the world, bringing their images of other places and other lives with them."

Despite living in the heart of Manhattan, Slonem remained true to his boyhood fascination with exotica, which he had developed as a youth in Hawaii and during his time as a foreign exchange student in Managua, Nicaragua. His paintings expressed a strong affinity for nature, especially the various species of exotic butterflies and tropical birds living on the island. He soon became well known for creating grisaille paintings of small birds in their cages. He often painted them wet-on-wet and grit off the surfaces to denote wire enclosures after the birds had been strategically placed. Art critic Roberta Smith wrote in The New York Times that Slonem's "witty Formalism strategy meshes the creatures into the picture plane and sometimes nearly obliterates them as images, but it also suspends and shrouds them in a dim, atmospheric light that is quite beautiful. If Joseph Cornell had concentrated on painting, the results might have looked like this." Birds also fill the surface of his largest project yet – a 6-foot by 86 foot mural he painted for the iconic Bryant Park Grill Restaurant in New York City, completed in 1995. According to The New Yorker, "The most notable aspect of the [restaurant's] interior is an 86-foot long mural by the artist Hunt Slonem, which depicts hundreds of birds, similar to those found in the artist's studio, where he can be found painting away with a bird or two perched on his shoulders."

Hunt Slonem's oil paintings pivot between the fantastic and the natural. These natural forms ultimately become the subjects for many of his artworks, appearing in large lavishly colored paintings and constructed sculptures. As an artist, he endeavors to explore the many expressive faculties of color. His paintings are layered with thick brushstrokes of vivid color, often cut into in a cross-hatched pattern that adds texture to the overall surface of the painting. Slonem often hides his subjects "behind a grid of incised lines, blurring their contours and emphasizing the paint's tactile quality." This surface patterning combines with the rich colors and recognizable subject matter to create paintings that are physically and aesthetically rich. Poet and critic John Ashbery observed, "From the narrow confines of his grids, half cage, half perch, Slonem summons dazzling explosions of the variable life around us that need only to be looked at in order to spring into being."

Slonem's obsessive and repetitive rendering of his subjects reflects his desire to explore issues of spatial complexity, compression and density in what the acclaimed Metropolitan Museum of Art curator Henry Geldzahler deemed "a consistent investigation of post-cubist abstraction." The repetitive imagery also makes a reference to Andy Warhol. "I was influenced by Warhol's repetition of soup cans and Marilyn," says Slonem. "But I'm more interested in doing it in the sense of prayer, with repetition... It's really a form of worship." He is not interested in realism or, unlike Warhol, in advertising or media, and his paintings are neither narrative nor specific in detail. Rather, Slonem's work is deeply rooted in the act of painting. His jarring color choices, spontaneous mark making, and scratched hatch marks are the result of his ongoing fascination with the manipulation and implementation of paint. For Slonem, cross-hatching has "a feeling of a tapestry, it's like weaving. I'm making colors bleed into each other, I'm revealing the under-painting. I'm making these marks to allow the light to come through, basically. So you're seeing about five levels of paint, instead of one." It is this kind of devotion to the process of painting that prompted Henry Geldzahler to observe in 1993 that "Slonem is a painter, a painter's painter with an enormous bag of technical tricks which become apparent to the viewer the longer he stands before the work."

Another recurring theme of Slonem's pictorial work is portrait painting, and that of Abraham Lincoln in particular. He is interested in history and memorabilia, and for him, the "larger-than-life" Lincoln is a catchall. In Slonem's words, "On Marilyn [Monroe]'s desk, she had a picture of her mother and a picture of Lincoln. And she said, 'I really didn't know who my father was, so it might as well be Abraham Lincoln.'" According to the Interview Magazine, "Slonem's portraits of Lincoln feel personal, and in surprising ways, he's close to the long-deceased." "I work with diviners and mystics, and one of them started channeling Lincoln in my house," says Slonem. "[Lincoln] guided me to paint certain things, like my doves: he wanted me to paint them as a symbol of freedom."

In the early 1980s, Slonem began working on a new series of so-called "Rabbit paintings." The idea for this critically acclaimed series came to him after he had discovered that the year of his birth, 1951, was the year of the Rabbit in the Chinese zodiac calendar. He often repeats imagery in this series, just like in his other series, because, he told The Wall Street Journal, the act is similar to spiritual meditation: "Mantras are holy because you repeat them." This theme continued to inspire Slonem over the years, and the series is as prominent in his work today as it was over thirty years ago.

Apart from painting, Slonem is also making sculptures, like the sizable, "Tocos," an 18-foot acrylic and aluminum tower of toucans exhibited at the Polk Museum of Art in 2012. He has also restored several historic houses. "I consider it part of my art form," Slonem said in an interview with NewsChief.com. His "art form" also includes Gothic revival furniture - in his homes, studios, and exhibits. In 2009, Bergdorf Goodman, a luxury department store in New York City, recreated Slonem's distinct art-filled living room for its windows display. In Slonem's view, "Art incorporated with furniture becomes a work of art itself."

In 2008, German automaker Audi enlisted Hunt Slonem to create an exclusive design for its sleek new A5 coupe, and he created a one-of-a-kind design based on one of his oil painting for the car's exterior. "It's an earlier work of mine with birds flying through the sky; the original work is in the collection of the Colby Museum in Maine, where I was born," said Slonem of the piece, which is painted in blues, blacks, reds, and whites with cockatoos. The mobile artwork was unveiled in conjunction with the New York International Auto Show at the Audi Forum in Manhattan. The "Hunt Slonem Audi A5," as it was dubbed, then toured Audi dealerships throughout the United States, before returning to New York where it was auctioned off to benefit a cancer research charity.

In 2010, Albert Maysles, the Oscar-nominated documentary filmmaker (Salesman, Gimme Shelter, Grey Gardens), announced that he will be shooting a feature-length documentary on Hunt Slonem's life and his art.

In 2014, he collaborated with fashion accessories company Echo Design Group for a limited edition scarf and handbag collection.

== Museum exhibitions and collections ==
Since 1977, Slonem had solo shows at many prestigious contemporary art galleries including the Fischbach Gallery in New York and the Serge Sorokko Gallery in San Francisco. His work has been exhibited globally, including in Madras, Quito, Venice, Gustavia, San Juan, Guatemala City, Paris, Amsterdam, Madrid, Stockholm, Oslo, Cologne, Tokyo, and Hong Kong. His work has been shown in thirty-one different museums including the Hunter Museum of American Art in Chattanooga, Tennessee, in 1981; the Museo Diocesano d'arte sacra Sant'Apollonia in Venice, Italy, in 1986; the Albany Museum of Art in Albany, Georgia, in 2007; the Istanbul Museum of Modern Art in Istanbul, Turkey, in 2007; Museo de Arte de El Salvador in San Salvador, El Salvador, in 2010; the National Gallery for Foreign Art in Sofia, Bulgaria, in 2010; the Alexandria Museum of Art in Alexandria, Louisiana in 2011, the Polk Museum of Art in Lakeland, Florida in 2012, the Moscow Museum of Modern Art in 2015, and the Russian State Museum in St. Petersburg, Russia in 2017, among others.

Slonem has been an active participant in the Art in Embassies Program sponsored by the United States Department of State, alongside other American artists including Jim Dine, Julian Schnabel, Sol LeWitt, Jasper Johns, Ellsworth Kelly, and Jeff Koons, who received the first ever Medal of Arts from the Department of State for his "outstanding commitment" to the program. Through Art in Embassies, Slonem's paintings have been exhibited globally revealing, as Hillary Clinton put it, "the rich history and cultural heritage of the United States and the experiences that we share with peoples of different countries, backgrounds and faiths. Every exhibition reminds us of the diversity of mankind and the values that bind us together."

Hunt Slonem's paintings are widely represented in important private collections all over the world. According to the San Francisco Chronicle, "Slonem's work has attracted many well-known [Hollywood] art collectors including Sharon Stone, Gina Gershon, Brooke Shields, Julianne Moore, Mandy Moore, Kate Hudson, and J.Lo", among others. "I'm a big fan of Hunt's work," Brooke Shields told Daily Front Row. "It's whimsical without being too sweet." A March 2012 issue of Architectural Digest features Shields's Manhattan townhouse, with three of Slonem's "rabbit paintings" prominently displayed on her living room wall.

Over fifty museums internationally include Hunt Slonem's paintings in their collections, among them the Smithsonian American Art Museum; the National Gallery of Art in Washington, D.C.; the Brooklyn Museum of Art in Brooklyn, NY; the Boston Museum of Fine Arts in Boston, Massachusetts; Fundació Joan Miró in Barcelona, Spain; the Würth Museum in Künzelsau, Germany; the Metropolitan Museum of Art, the Whitney Museum of American Art, and the Solomon R. Guggenheim Museum all in New York.

== Personal life ==
Until 2010, Slonem occupied a Tenth Street studio in Manhattan that was 40,000 square feet, divided into 89 rooms. In 2010, Slonem moved to a 15,000 square foot fourth floor former headquarters of the film company Moviola, on West 45th Street. The space served as his painting studio and was divided into a number of small rooms, all of which Slonem painted in old Louisiana plantation-house colors. The studio housed his collections, from Neo-Gothic chairs to top hats, to marble busts of Marie Antoinette, to various objets d'art, mined from flea markets and antique fairs. In an interview in Vincent Katz's book Pleasure Palaces: The Art & Homes of Hunt Slonem, he describes his collecting technique as "cluttering." For him, objects are "friends;" the more there are, the more he is inspired. "I have to have a certain amount of stuff in place before I can function and paint," he says. Although, Slonem still lives in the loft apartment he moved into in 1973, according to The Wall Street Journal, he does nearly all his entertaining at his new 25,000 square foot West 34th Street studio in the industrial Hell's Kitchen neighborhood of Manhattan where he moved in 2011.

Slonem also owned two historically important Louisiana plantations—one called Albania Plantation, on the Bayou Teche in St. Mary Parish, about two hours' drive northwest of New Orleans. He sold this property in 2021 to Louisiana natives Liz and Terry Creel. The other in the Lakeside Plantation, in a remote location near the town of Batchelor, one hour north of Baton Rouge. According to The New York Times, the Batchelor property includes "an 1832 plantation house called Lakeside, pink if you please, as surprising in this community of shoebox houses as an aged diva in a pink organdy dress at McDonald's. Also as indifferent, inasmuch as a house can be indifferent, to the bruising of time." It was once owned by Marquis de La Fayette whose close relationship with lifelong friends such as Thomas Jefferson, Benjamin Franklin, James Monroe, John Adams, and Robert Livingston played a pivotal role in the Louisiana Purchase. The United States gave La Fayette land which is known today as Lakeside Plantation. The property is listed in the National Register of Historic Places listings in Louisiana.

In 2021, Slonem purchased the Searles Castle in Great Barrington, Massachusetts.

== Bibliography ==
- The Worlds of Hunt Slonem by Dominique Nahas; Vendome Press, New York, 2011
- Hunt Slonem: The feather game by Hunt Slonem; Marlborough Chelsea, New York, 2008
- Pleasure Palaces: The Art & Homes of Hunt Slonem by Vincent Katz; powerHouse Books, New York, 2007
- Hunt Slonem: An Art Rich and Strange by Donald B. Kuspit; Harry N. Abrams Books Incorporated, New York, 2007
- Hunt Slonem: Saints & Angels by J. William Zeitlin, Hunt Slonem, et al.; Ursuline College, 2007
- Exotica by Vincent Katz et al.; Edizioni d'Arte Fratelli Pozzo, Turin, Italy, 1997
- Hunt's Place by Vincent Katz, Ronny Cohen, and John Ashbery; Didegnodiverso, Turin, Italy, 1995
- Hunt Slonem by Henry Geldzahler (Foreword); Kunst Editions/Jano Group, New York, 1993
- Hunt Slonem: Paradise Elsewhere by Holland Cotter and David J. Messer Slonem, Bergen Museum of Art and Science, Hackensack, NJ, 1990
- Hunt Slonem by Holland Cotter and David J. Messer Slonem, Bergen Museum of Art and Science, Hackensack, NJ, 1990
- ‘’Hunt Slonem’’ by Robert Flynn Johnson and Alexander Rozhin, Moscow Museum of Modern Art, Moscow, Russian Federation, 2015
- ‘’Hunt Slonem’’ by Anthony Haden-Guest and Anton Uspensky, Russian State Museum, St. Petersburg, Russian Federation, 2017
- ‘’Hunt Slonem’’ by Ekaterina Reznikova, A. Kasteyev State Museum of Arts, Almaty, Republic of Kazakhstan, 2018
