= Darby House (Baldwin, Louisiana) =

Slave plantation

- U.S. National Register of Historic Places
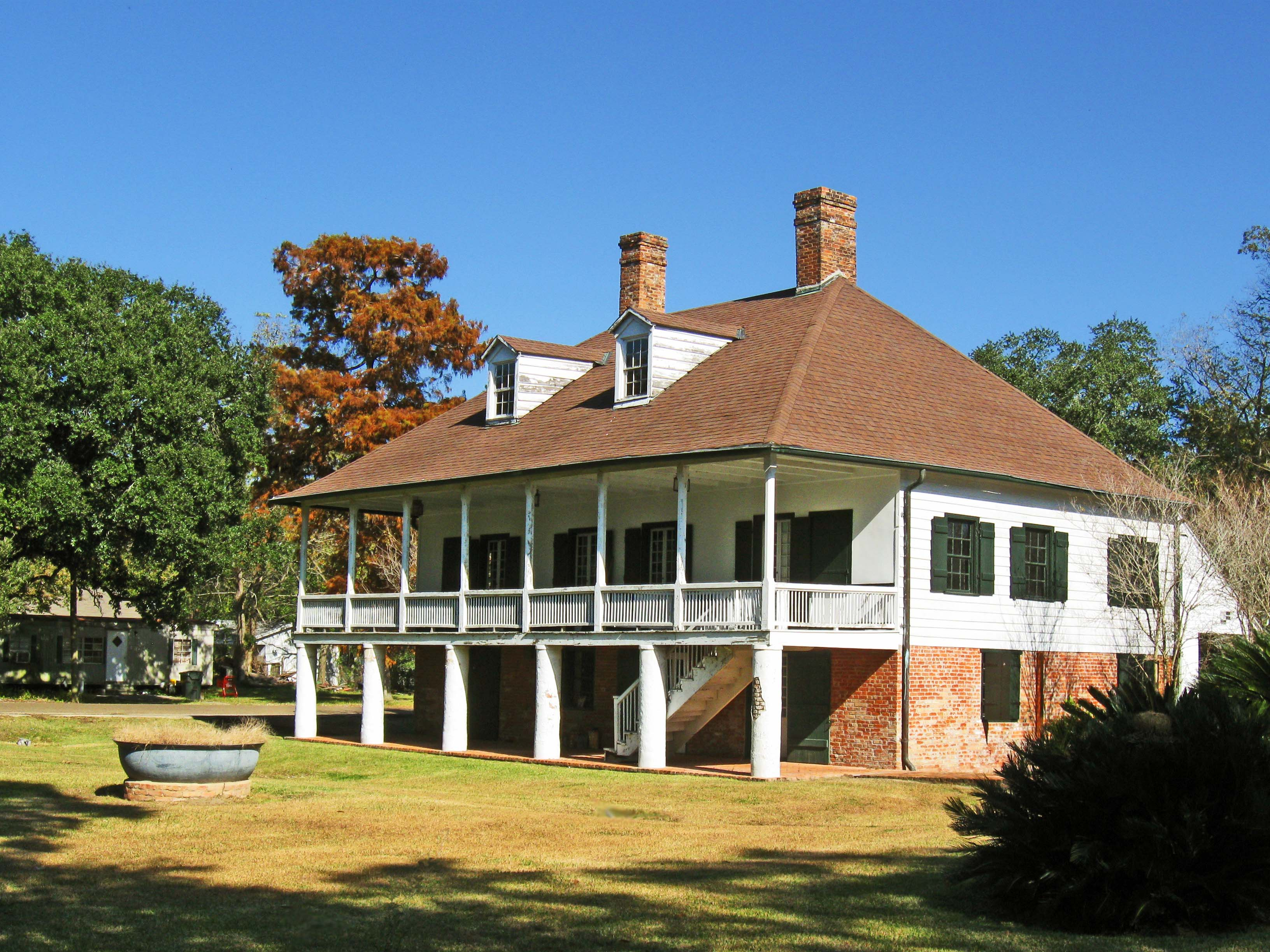
- The plantation house in 2014.

- Location within Louisiana
- Location: 102 Main St. Baldwin, Louisiana, United States
- Coordinates: 29°50′14″N 91°32′38″W
- Built: c. 1782
- Architectural style: French Colonial, Creole Architecture
- NRHP reference No.: 82004678
- Added to NRHP: August 11, 1982

The Massé/Darby House is a plantation house fronting on Highway 182 in Baldwin, St. Mary Parish, Louisiana. It was originally part of a large sugar plantation.

== History ==
The builder and precise date of construction of the house, called Darby House on the National Register of Historic Places, is presently unverified. An undocumented newspaper article in possession of the current owner of the house dates the Darby House to 1782 and names the builder as Andre Massé, according to "records of the present owner, Mr. D.L. Johnson". Another article from the Eunice News by Marie Johnson, 5 October 1976, gives a building date of 1764-1776. These two articles, although discrepant, are especially noteworthy in that the Johnson family owned or resided in the Massé/Darby House from 1938 until 1981, and apparently possessed documentation now lost or unavailable to present day researchers.

An article in the New Orleans Times-Picayune, 4 July 1976, by the Louisiana Tourist Commission, dates the house (again without citation) to 1765; and the late Emery Hebert, who owned Darby House from 2001 to 2014, in an undated handout follows suit, citing the 1765 date but incongruously naming the builder as Alfred Hennnen, who was born in 1786.

In 1969 the House was purchased by the St. Mary Bank, which, in 1981, commissioned Leonard L. Battaglia to research the property transfers for the house. Battaglia traced the land upon which the house stands to an original Spanish land grant to Andre Massé, but his report contains no mention of the house itself until 1814, when Dr. James Hennen sold the land "where vendor [i.e. James Hennen] now resides" to his son Alfred Hennen. This brief statement has led several writers, among them the reporter for the National Register of Historic Places, to credit James Hennen as the builder of the house with a building date of 1815. There are no known records that substantiate either the attribution to Hennen or the date of 1815.

The history of "Darby House" in Baldwin, Louisiana, has suffered from confusion or misreading of others sorts. Much confusion has arisen from the existence of another house known by the same name and of similar period and style—no longer standing but still remembered—in nearby New Iberia. Yet further confusion is with Alice plantation, modeled on and thus post-dating the Massé/Darby house, that once stood in Baldwin but was moved in 1961 to Jeanerette. Alice has also been variously dated: a bronze plaque at roadside gives a building date of 1790, while other sources date the house to 1803. But even this latter date would place the Massé/Darby House earlier than James Hennen's ownership, which dates to 1809.

Andre Massé was, arguably, the earliest settler of the Attakapas. A census of 1766 records M. Massé with household, including 24 slaves, near present-day Charenton, three miles from Baldwin. Thus Massé was well-established early on, with a sizeable entourage. It is plausible—indeed likely—that M. Massé would have built a substantial home for his enterprise, underpinning the attribution of the house to Andre Massé as reported by the Johnson family.

The Massé/Darby House has been owned by, or home to several locally prominent people over the years, including Agricole Fusellier and Charles Grevemberg. It was owned at the time of the Civil War by François Optat Darby (a captain in the Confederate Army) and subsequently purchased in 1867 by the philanthropist and educator John Baldwin, after whom the town of Baldwin is named. The house remained in the possession of Mr. Baldwin or his descendants until 1938, when it was purchased by Jessie Frost Johnson.

== French Colonial Style ==
The Massé/Darby House exemplifies a distinct style of French colonial domestic architecture once common throughout Louisiana but now quite rare.

The Massé/Darby House is two-storied with thick lower walls of brick, and upper walls of bousillage-entre-poteau (mud, mixed with animal hair, between posts). The ground floor was used for utilitarian purposes, such as office, storage, cooking, etc. The upper-level was used for living—a central parlor with a fireplace opens onto a broad gallery across the front and onto an inner loggia at back, with bedrooms situated to either side. To the rear, cabinets—smaller general-purpose rooms used variously as auxiliary bedrooms, sick rooms, or sewing rooms—flank the loggia.

Rooms are entirely en suite, each opening out onto gallery or loggia via French (glazed double) doors. Gallery and loggia function as outdoor covered hallways, replete with stairways, and overhung by a steep, double-hipped and dormer roof. Fireplaces, normally with French wraparound mantels, are interior. The disposition of rooms at ground-level essentially duplicates that above.

On the façade, five bays defined by substantial round columns of plastered brick support an upper gallery of seven bays defined by slender wooden colonnettes. Doors and windows are positioned in relation to the interior of rooms rather than the façade. From without they may consequently appear somewhat disjunct, or "syncopated" in relation to the regular cadence of columns and bays.

== See also ==
- National Register of Historic Places listings in St. Mary Parish, Louisiana
