= Calumet Plantation House =

Historic house in Louisiana, United States

- U.S. National Register of Historic Places
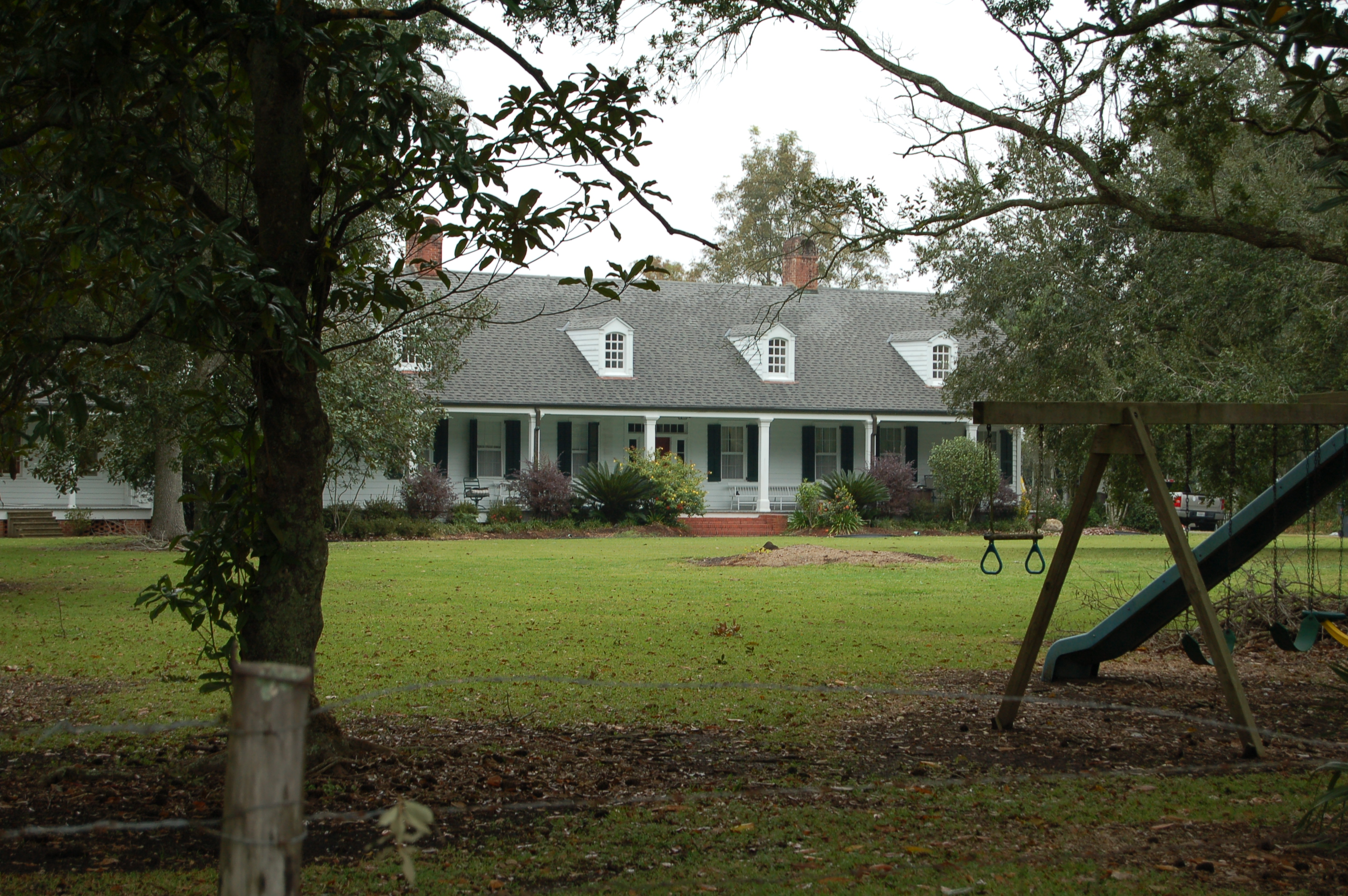

- Location within Louisiana Location within the United States
- Nearest city: Patterson, Louisiana
- Coordinates: 29°42′42″N 91°20′40″W
- Area: 9 acres (3.6 ha)
- Built: c.1830, c.1850-70, c.1950
- NRHP reference No.: 84002859
- Added to NRHP: October 18, 1984

The Calumet Plantation House, in St. Mary Parish, Louisiana near Patterson, Louisiana, was built around 1830, modified c.1850-70, and further modified around 1950. The house was originally part of a forced-labor sugar plantation and was added to the National Register of Historic Places in 1984.

The house was deemed architecturally significant "as an example of a very successful conversion and major enlargement of an early nineteenth century 'cottage' sized house into a mid-nineteenth century large 'plantation house.'"

== See also ==
- National Register of Historic Places listings in St. Mary Parish, Louisiana
