= Berwick High School (Louisiana) =

Location
- 700 Patti Drive; Berwick, Louisiana 70342; United States; 29.7140°N 91.2401°W

Information
- Type: Public High School
- School district: St. Mary Parish School Board
- Principal: Toney Linn
- Staff: 32.43 (FTE)
- Enrollment: 519 (2023-2024)
- Student to teacher ratio: 16.00
- Colors: Black and gold
- Mascot: Panthers
- Nickname: BHS
- Website: bhs.stmaryk12.net

Berwick High School, abbreviated BHS, is a high school in Berwick, Louisiana, United States. It is a part of the St. Mary Parish School Board.

During the academic years of 2007, 2008, and 2013, U.S. News & World Report recognized Berwick High School as a bronze medal school, ranking it as one of the best high schools in the United States in an annual report.

== Extracurricular activities ==
Berwick High offers 4-H Club, Anime Club, Beta Club, Chess Club, Drama Club, FFA, Insight, Interact, Key Club, Quiz Bowl, Student Council, and HOSA.

== Athletics ==
Berwick is in District 9-3A of the LHSAA and offers athletic programs, such as football, cheerleading, cross country, swim team, volleyball, basketball, baseball, softball, track and field, bowling, power-lifting and golf.

The current Athletic Director is Coach Mike Walker.

=== Championships ===
Baseball Championships
The baseball team won the Class 2A State Championship in 1978 defeating John Curtis High School by a score of 2-0. In 2018, they won the Class 3A State Championship, defeating Iota High School 7-2. On May 12, 2023, the Berwick High School baseball team beat third-seeded Doyle High School 4-2 winning the Division III nonselect title game at the LHSAA state baseball tournament at McMurry Park.

Softball Championships
The softball team is a two-time state championship team under the direction of Lloyd Burchfield.

Tennis Championships
The tennis team won state in 2012 and were state runner-up in 2013.

== Band ==
Berwick High School's band, the Sound of Pride, has won sweepstakes honors at Louisiana's State Instrumental Festival for 2005, 2006, 2007, 2009, 2010, 2011, 2012, and 2014. The band also competes in Class A at the Louisiana Showcase of Marching Bands. The Sound of Pride has won three back-to-back championships from 2001 to 2003 and back-to-back championships from 2006 to 2008. Since 2013, the Sound of Pride has been under the direction of Mrs. BJ McCarter.
