= Garden City, Louisiana =

- Unincorporated community
- Location within Louisiana Location within the United States
- Coordinates: 29°45′56″N 91°27′56″W
- Country: United States
- State: Louisiana
- Parish: St. Mary
- Elevation: 13 ft (4.0 m)
- Time zone: UTC-6 (Central (CST))
  - Summer (DST): UTC-5 (CDT)
- ZIP code: 70540
- Area code: 337
- GNIS feature ID: 560813

Garden City is an unincorporated community in St. Mary Parish, Louisiana, United States. The community is on the south bank of the Bayou Teche, 3 miles (4.8 km) southeast of Franklin and 2 miles (3.2 km) west of Centerville another unincorporated community. Garden City had a post office until it closed on September 24, 2011; it still has its own ZIP code, 70540.

== History ==
Garden City was founded as a company town by the Albert Hanson Lumber Company. In 1993, two former company properties were added to the National Register of Historic Places: Hanson Lumber Company Office and Hanson Lumber Company Owner's House.

== Education ==
Garden City is served by the Centerville School (K-12) of the St. Mary Parish School Board, located in Centerville.
