= Berwick, Louisiana =

- Town
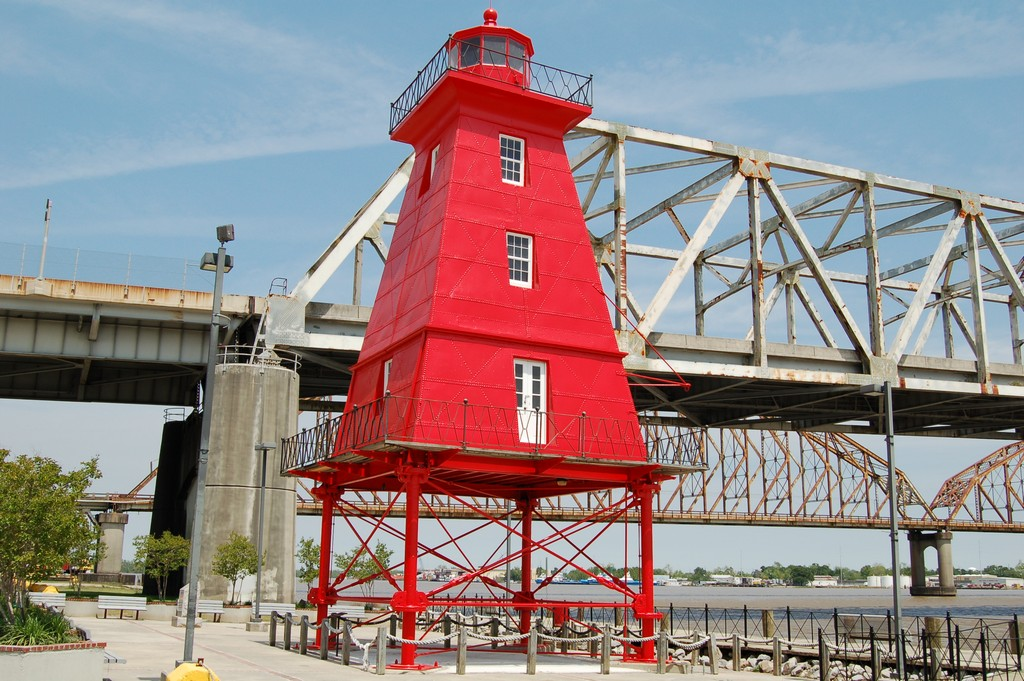
- The Southwest Reef Lighthouse

- Location of Berwick in St. Mary Parish, Louisiana.

- Location of Louisiana in the United States
- Coordinates: 29°41′53″N 91°13′37″W
- Country: United States
- State: Louisiana
- Parish: St. Mary
- Founder: Daniel Gray

Area
  - Total: 6.07 sq mi (15.72 km^{2})
  - Land: 5.90 sq mi (15.28 km^{2})
  - Water: 0.17 sq mi (0.44 km^{2})
- Elevation: 3 ft (0.91 m)

Population (2020)
  - Total: 4,771
  - Density: 808.5/sq mi (312.18/km^{2})
- Time zone: UTC-6 (CST)
  - Summer (DST): UTC-5 (CDT)
- Area code: 985
- FIPS code: 22-07100
- Website: www.berwickla.gov

Berwick is a town in St. Mary Parish, Louisiana, United States. As of the 2020 census, Berwick had a population of 4,771. It is part of the Morgan City Micropolitan Statistical Area.

The town relocated the Southwest Reef Light and has been trying to save the Ship Shoal Light

== History ==
The first settler in the area was Thomas Berwick (c. 1740-c. 1792), a Philadelphia-born surveyor in the Opelousas district. He and his family settled on the banks of the Atchafalaya River after receiving a land grant in 1779. Berwick wanted to establish a port at the mouth of the river. His son Joseph (1783-1852) established a settlement on the west bank of the river that became the town of Berwick.

Today Berwick is home to several seafood processing plants and numerous boat companies.

== Geography ==
According to the United States Census Bureau, the town has a total area of 6.1 square miles (15.7 km^{2}), of which 5.9 square miles (15.3 km^{2}) is land and 0.15 square miles (0.4 km^{2}), or 2.84%, is water.

== Demographics ==
Historical population
Census	Pop.	Note	%±
1880	796		—
1890	769		−3.4%
1900	713		−7.3%
1910	2,183		206.2%
1920	1,691		−22.5%
1930	1,679		−0.7%
1940	1,906		13.5%
1950	2,619		37.4%
1960	3,880		48.1%
1970	4,168		7.4%
1980	4,466		7.1%
1990	4,375		−2.0%
2000	4,418		1.0%
2010	4,946		12.0%
2020	4,771		−3.5%
2025 (est.)	4,455	▼	−6.6%
U.S. Decennial Census

Berwick racial composition as of 2020
Race	Number	Percentage
White (non-Hispanic)	3,601	75.48%
Black or African American (non-Hispanic)	516	10.82%
Native American	40	0.84%
Asian	26	0.54%
Pacific Islander	3	0.06%
Other/Mixed	190	3.98%
Hispanic or Latino	395	8.28%

As of the 2020 United States census, there were 4,771 people, 1,665 households, and 1,016 families residing in the town.

== Education ==
St. Mary Parish School Board operates public schools:

- Berwick High School
- Berwick Junior High School
- Berwick Elementary School

== Media ==
- KBZE FM urban radio station

== Notable people ==
- Jenny Craig, founder of Jenny Craig, Inc.
