= Baldwin, Louisiana =

- Town
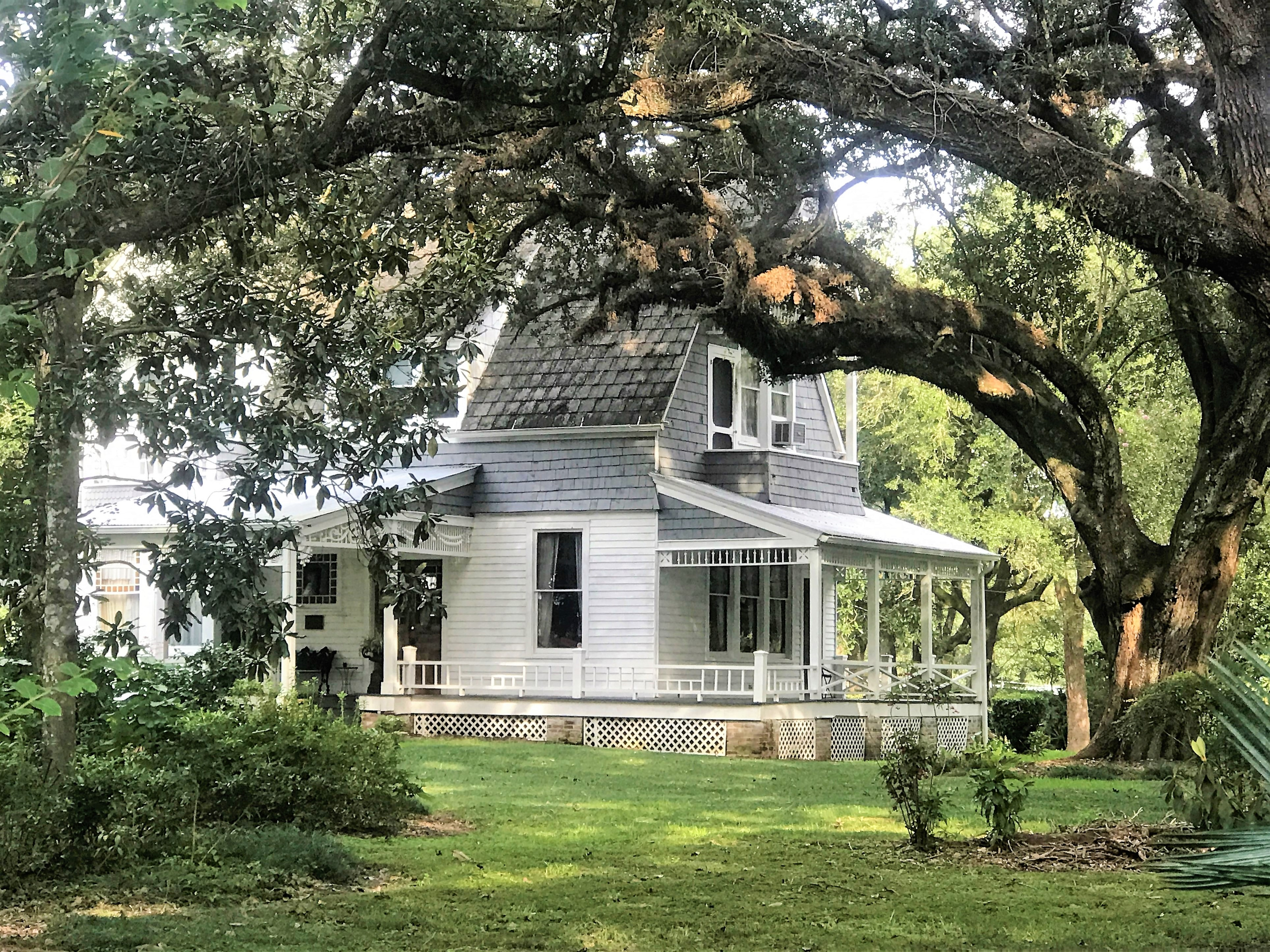
- Tillandsia, a historic residence in Baldwin

- Location of Baldwin in St. Mary Parish, Louisiana.

- Location of Louisiana in the United States
- Coordinates: 29°50′10″N 91°32′56″W
- Country: United States
- State: Louisiana
- Parish: St. Mary

Government
  - Mayor: Clarence A. Vappie

Area
  - Total: 3.23 sq mi (8.36 km^{2})
  - Land: 3.22 sq mi (8.33 km^{2})
  - Water: 0.0077 sq mi (0.02 km^{2})
- Elevation: 16 ft (4.9 m)

Population (2020)
  - Total: 1,762
  - Density: 547.7/sq mi (211.47/km^{2})
- Time zone: UTC-6 (CST)
  - Summer (DST): UTC-5 (CDT)
- Area code: 337
- FIPS code: 22-04020
- Website: www.townofbaldwin.org

Baldwin is a town in St. Mary Parish, Louisiana, United States. As of the 2020 census, Baldwin had a population of 1,762. It is part of the Morgan City Micropolitan Statistical Area. Its population is majority African American. The town has been home to educational institutions for white and "colored" students.

== History ==
The community was named for John Baldwin, the Ohio educator who founded what would later become Baldwin-Wallace University. In 1867, Baldwin purchased the Darby plantation in Louisiana, a plantation of about 1,700 acres (6.9 km^{2}). His residence there, Darby House, remained in his family until 1937 and is now listed on the National Register of Historic Places.

Gilbert Academy and Industrial School was in Baldwin. It became Godman Industrial School and 14 years after closing in 1978 became the United Methodist Committee on Relief (UMCOR) Sager Brown campus. The Louisiana physician and politician Alvan Lafargue practiced in Baldwin, his wife's hometown, prior to 1915.

The Tillandsia residence, built by John Baldwin Sr., is listed on the National Register of Historic Places (National Register of Historic Places listings in St. Mary Parish, Louisiana). Cypremort Point State Park is located 22 miles (35 km) southwest of Baldwin.

== Geography ==
Highways include Louisiana Highway 182 and Louisiana Highway 83.

According to the United States Census Bureau, the town has a total area of 3.2 square miles (8.3 km^{2}), all land.

== Demographics ==
Historical population
| Census | Pop. | Note | %± |
|---|---|---|---|
| 1920 | 964 | | — |
| 1930 | 822 | | −14.7% |
| 1940 | 984 | | 19.7% |
| 1950 | 1,138 | | 15.7% |
| 1960 | 1,548 | | 36.0% |
| 1970 | 2,117 | | 36.8% |
| 1980 | 2,644 | | 24.9% |
| 1990 | 2,379 | | −10.0% |
| 2000 | 2,497 | | 5.0% |
| 2010 | 2,436 | | −2.4% |
| 2020 | 1,762 | | −27.7% |
| 2025 (est.) | 1,676 | ▼ | −4.9% |
U.S. Decennial Census

Baldwin racial composition as of 2020
| Race | Number | Percentage |
|---|---|---|
| White (non-Hispanic) | 513 | 29.11% |
| Black or African American (non-Hispanic) | 1,105 | 62.71% |
| Native American | 21 | 1.19% |
| Asian | 9 | 0.51% |
| Pacific Islander | 1 | 0.06% |
| Other/Mixed | 77 | 4.37% |
| Hispanic or Latino | 36 | 2.04% |

As of the 2020 United States census, there were 1,762 people, 804 households, and 447 families residing in the town.

== Education ==
St. Mary Parish School Board operates public schools. West St. Mary High School is near Baldwin.
