= Arlington Plantation House (Franklin, Louisiana) =

Historic Antebellum Home in Louisiana, United States

- U.S. National Register of Historic Places
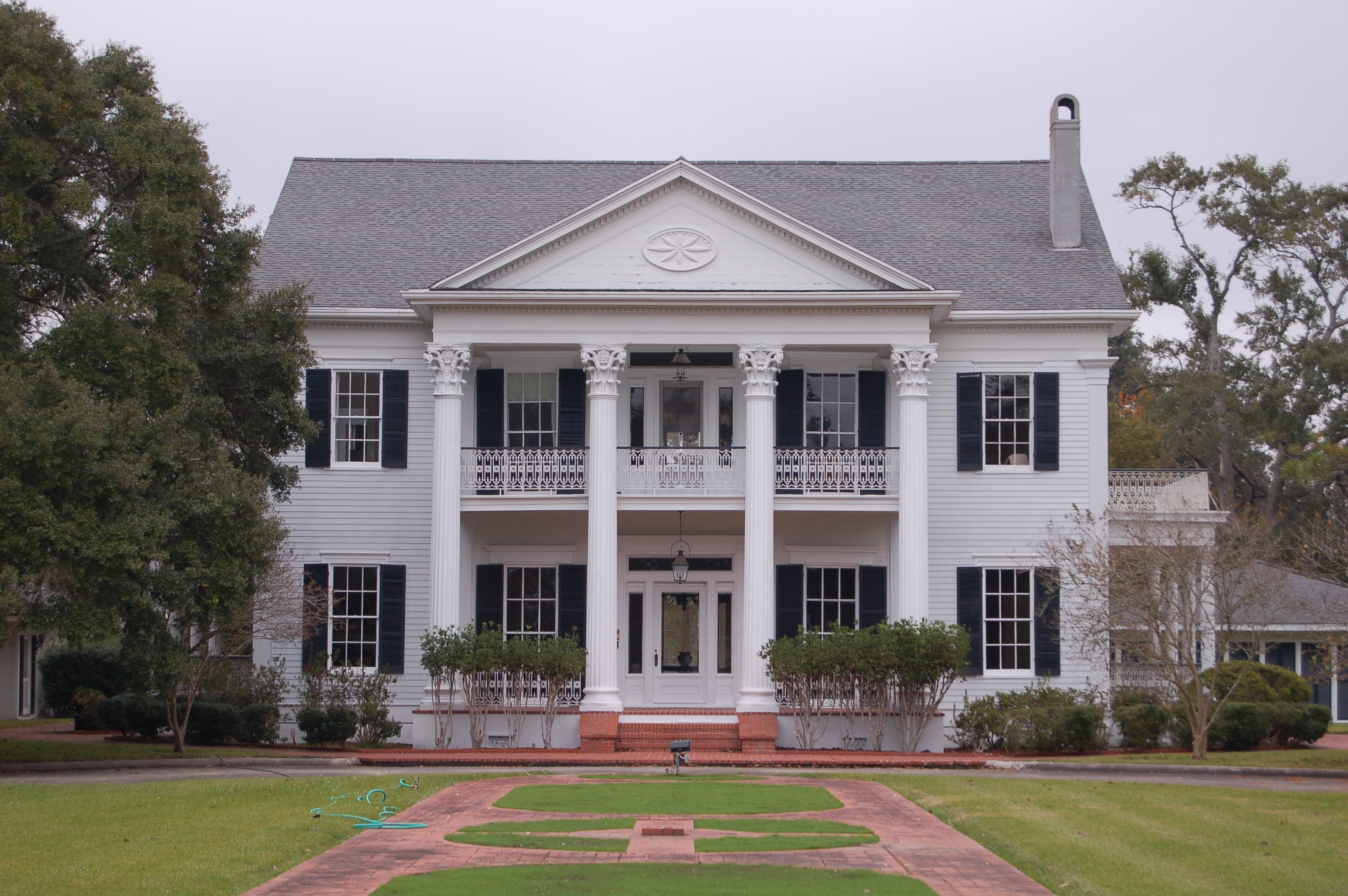

- Location within Louisiana Location within the United States
- Location: 56 E. Main Street, Franklin, Louisiana
- Coordinates: 29°46′43″N 91°29′35″W
- Area: 0.3 acres (0.12 ha)
- Built: c. 1830
- Architectural style: Greek Revival
- NRHP reference No.: 82000457
- Added to NRHP: October 05, 1982

Arlington Plantation House (now known as Arlington Mansion) is an historic home located at 56 E. Main St. in Franklin, Louisiana.

== Description and history ==
It is a 3-story Greek Revival style house, designed and used as a single dwelling, and is undoubtedly the most widely recognized historic archetype of the southern states. It was built around 1830 and was added to the National Register of Historic Places on October 5, 1982.

It is now offered as a wedding and events venue and for overnight stays .
