= Atkinson Memorial Presbyterian Church =

Historic church in Louisiana, United States

- U.S. National Register of Historic Places
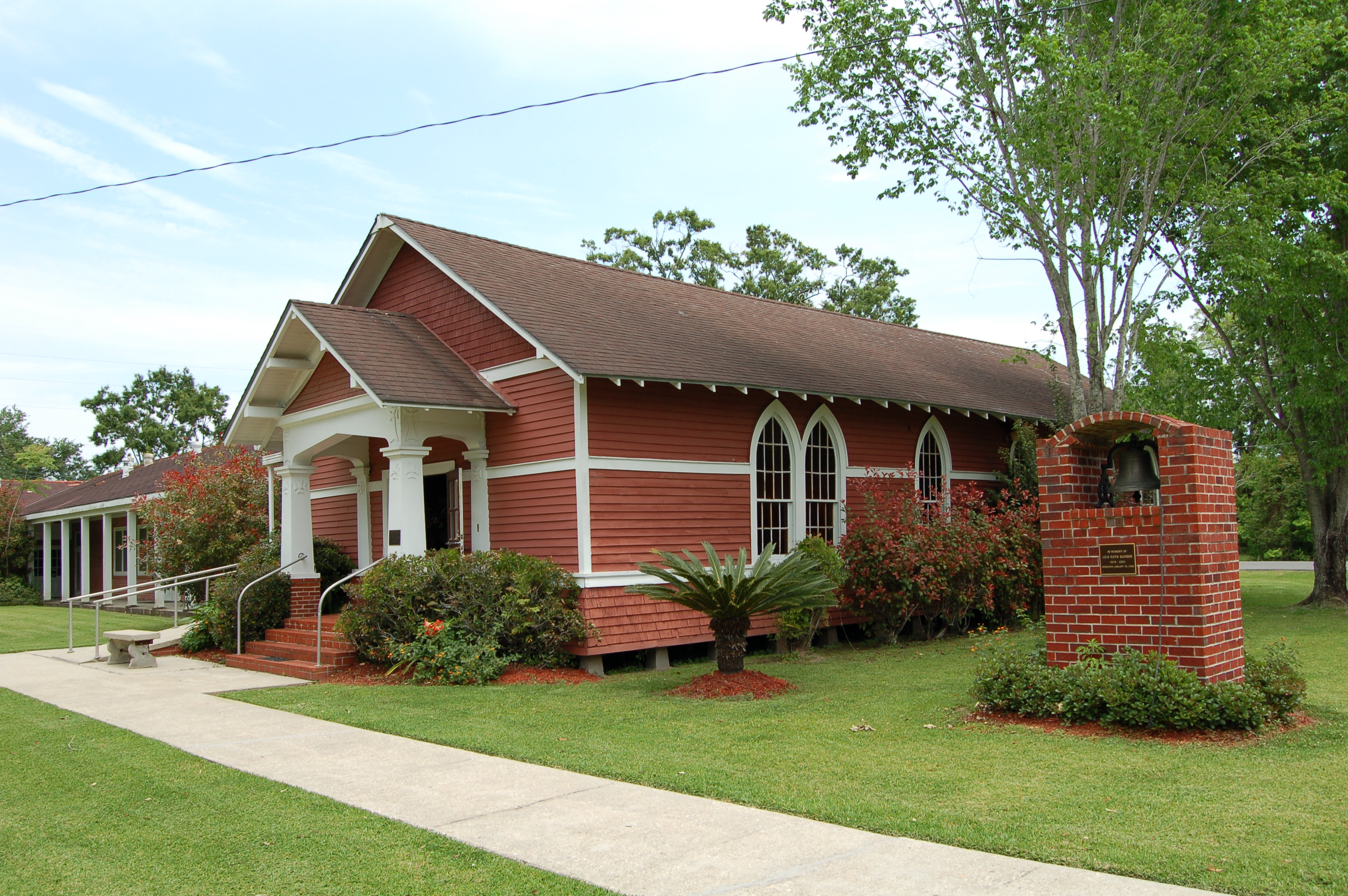

- Location within Louisiana Location within the United States
- Location: 214 Fourth St., Morgan City, Louisiana
- Coordinates: 29°41′34″N 91°12′4″W
- Area: 5.3 acres (2.1 ha)
- Built: 1916
- Architectural style: Bungalow, Gothic Revival
- NRHP reference No.: 91000248
- Added to NRHP: March 19, 1991

Atkinson Memorial Presbyterian Church is a historic Presbyterian church at 214 Fourth Street in Morgan City, Louisiana.

It was built in 1916 in a Bungalow and Gothic Revival style. Its Gothic Revival features include lanced windows on either side of the nave, a pointed arch on the entrance porch, and a pitched roof supported by exposed trusses. Its Bungalow style features include a facade with a double gable, tapered porch columns above brick piers, bracketed and overhanging eaves, a water table that flares out and has shingles, and exposed rafter ends. The building was added to the National Register of Historic Places in 1991.
