= West St. Mary High School =

School in Louisiana, United States

Location
- 18333 Highway 182 West; Baldwin, (St. Mary Parish), Louisiana 70514; United States; 29.8576°N 91.5684°W

Information
- Type: Public high school
- School district: St. Mary Parish School Board
- Principal: Suzette Charpentier
- Staff: 20.27 (FTE)
- Enrollment: 276 (2024-2025)
- Student to teacher ratio: 13.62
- Colors: Navy, white, columbia blue, and gray
- Mascot: Wolfpack
- Website: wsmhs.stmaryk12.net

West St. Mary High School (WSMHS) is a high school in unincorporated St. Mary Parish, Louisiana, near Baldwin. It is a part of the St. Mary Parish School Board.

== Athletics ==
West St. Mary High athletics competes in the LHSAA.
