= Southwest Reef Light =

Lighthouse in Louisiana, US

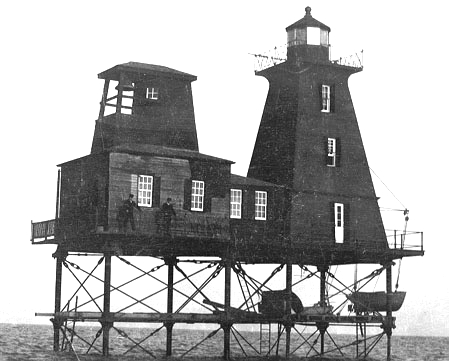
- The original location in Atchafalaya Bay with home for the lighthouse keeper.
- Location: Atchafalaya Bay, Louisiana
- Coordinates: 29°41′39.4″N 91°12′58.7″W

Tower
- Constructed: 1848, Lightship; 1856
- Foundation: Pile with two platforms
- Construction: Iron plate
- Shape: Square pyramid on skeleton
- Markings: Red
- Heritage: National Register of Historic Places listed place

Light
- First lit: 1858 Current tower
- Deactivated: 1916
- Lens: 4th order Fresnel lens
- Southwest Reef Lighthouse
- U.S. National Register of Historic Places
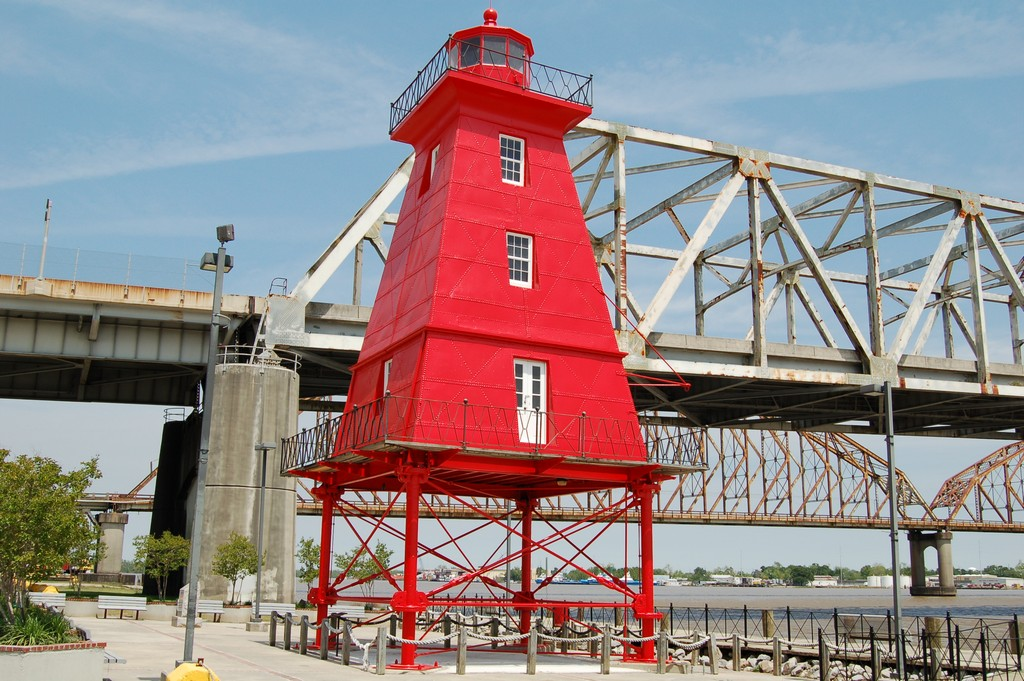
- The relocated lighthouse on the Berwick waterfront.
- Location: Jct. of Bellevue Front and Canton Sts., Berwick, Louisiana
- Area: less than one acre
- Built: 1858
- Architectural style: Egyptian Revival
- NRHP reference No.: 91001152
- Added to NRHP: September 12, 1991

Southwest Reef Light is a historic lighthouse built in 1856 at the end of Southwest Reef in Atchafalaya Bay, Louisiana to replace lightships which had been stationed there for ten years. It served to guide vessels around the reef and into the main channel of the Atchafalaya River. It was discontinued in 1916 after a new, shorter and deeper, channel had been dredged across the reef, making it obsolete. Point Au Fer Reef Light took over its function.

== Relocation ==
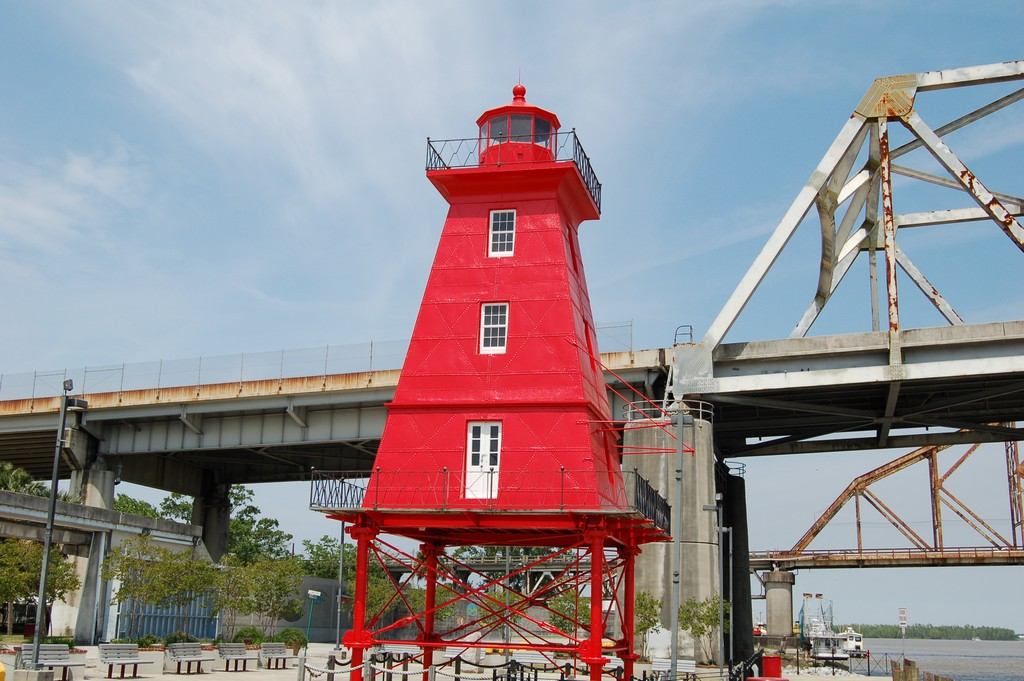
Southwest Reef Light relocated to Berwick (Shown in 2005)

It sat, rusting, in shallow water on the reef until 1987 when the town of Berwick, Louisiana paid to have it moved about 25 miles (40 km) upriver to a park in the town on the Atchafalaya River. It was added to the National Register of Historic Places in 1991 as Southwest Reef Lighthouse.

The location given in the title bar and the National Register box is the current location in Berwick. The location given in the upper box is its original location on the reef.
