= Franklin, Louisiana =

- City
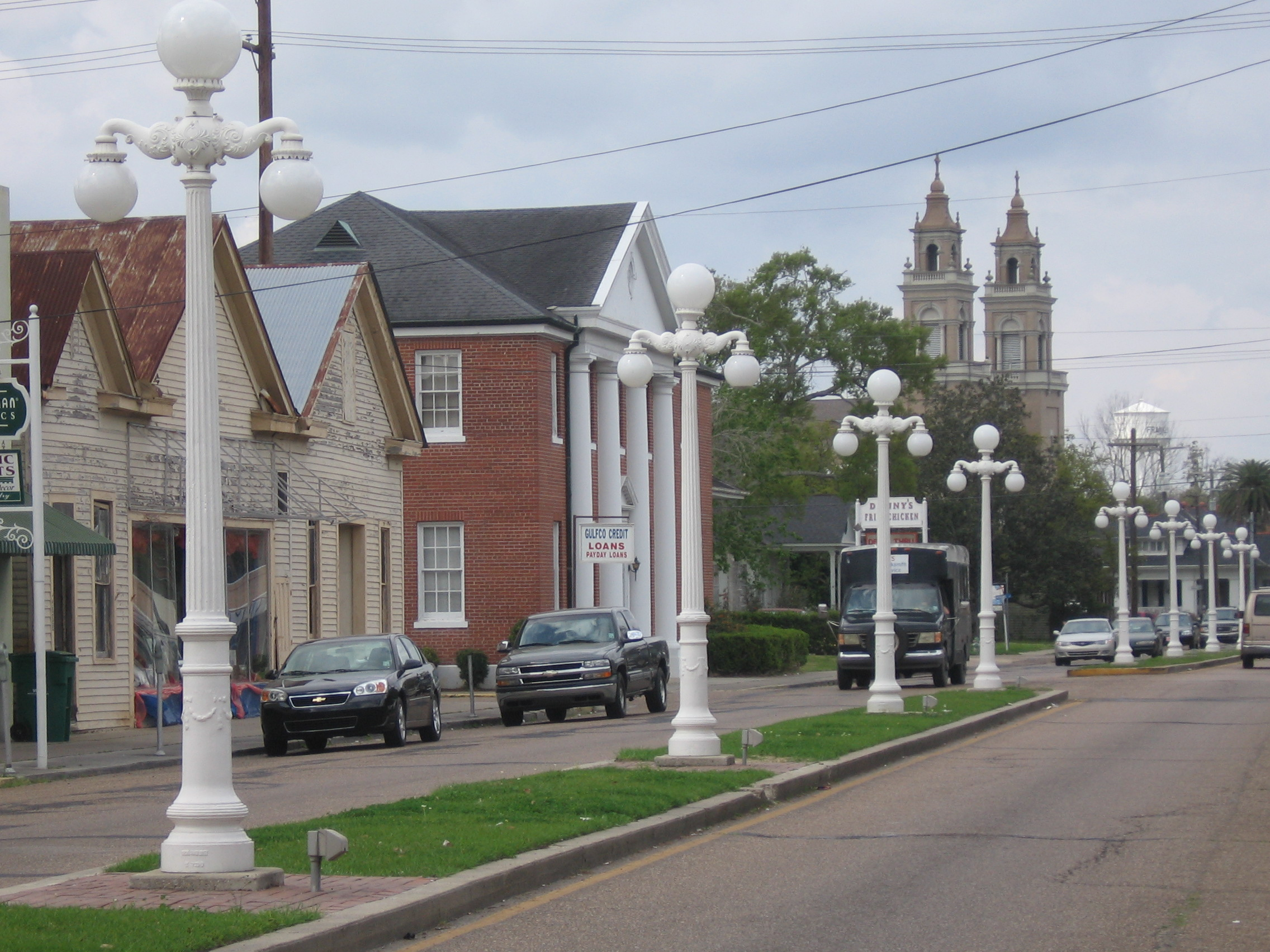
- Historic lampposts lining Franklin's Main Street

- Location of Franklin in St. Mary Parish, Louisiana.

- Location of Louisiana in the United States
- Coordinates: 29°47′30″N 91°30′30″W
- Country: United States
- State: Louisiana
- Parish: St. Mary
- Incorporated: 1820

Government
  - Mayor: Eugene P. Foulcard (Democrat)

Area
  - Total: 10.49 sq mi (27.17 km^{2})
  - Land: 9.92 sq mi (25.70 km^{2})
  - Water: 0.57 sq mi (1.48 km^{2})
- Elevation: 10 ft (3.0 m)

Population (2020)
  - Total: 6,728
  - Density: 678.1/sq mi (261.82/km^{2})
- Time zone: UTC-6 (CST)
  - Summer (DST): UTC-5 (CDT)
- ZIP code: 70538
- Area code: 337
- FIPS code: 22-27155
- Website: www.franklin-la.com

Franklin is a small city in and the parish seat of St. Mary Parish, Louisiana, United States. The population was 6,134 as of 2025. The city is located on Bayou Teche, southeast of the cities of Lafayette, 47 miles (76 km) and New Iberia, 28 miles (45 km), and 22 miles (35 km) northwest of Morgan City. It is part of the Morgan City Micropolitan Statistical Area and the larger Lafayette-Acadiana combined statistical area.

== History ==
Franklin, named for Benjamin Franklin, was founded in 1808 as the "Carlin's Settlement" by French-born pioneer Joseph Carlin and his family. It became the parish seat in 1811 and the town was incorporated in 1820. Though early settlers included French, Acadian, German, Danish and Irish, the town's culture and architecture is heavily influenced by the unusually large numbers of English that chose to settle there after the Louisiana Purchase in 1803.

Numerous large sugar plantations arose in the area, and with the development of steam-boating, Franklin became an interior sugar port. With the later advent of the railroad, it became a sawmill town.

Franklin's First United Methodist Church was established in 1806, making it the first Protestant church established in the state of Louisiana.

=== Sugar plantations ===
By the 1830s, Bayou Teche was the main street of Acadiana, with one plantation after another. The area's sugar cane planters were among the South's wealthiest agriculturists. This is reflected in the large plantation homes and mansions they built in Franklin and the surrounding countryside. Most of these structures are still standing and well preserved.

Franklin's Historic District is listed in the National Register of Historic Places (NRHP) and encompasses over 420 notable structures. Some of the historic plantations in Franklin listed in the NRHP include the Alice C. Plantation House, Arlington Plantation House, and the Dixie Plantation House.

=== Civil War ===
During the Civil War, the Battle of Irish Bend, also known as Nerson's Woods, was fought near Franklin on April 14, 1863. Though eventually forced to retreat, the badly outnumbered Confederate forces commanded by General Richard Taylor cost the Union troops, under General Cuvier Grover, significant losses. Four hundred men were killed or wounded in the confrontation, including Confederate Colonel James Reily, a factor in halting the Union drive to invade Texas.

== Geography ==
According to the United States Census Bureau, the city has a total area of 10.5 square miles (27.2 km^{2}), of which 9.9 square miles (25.7 km^{2}) is land and 0.58 square miles (1.5 km^{2}), or 5.44%, is water.

Louisiana Highways 182, which runs through downtown, and 87, which is located on the outskirts of Franklin, both head north passing through the communities of Baldwin, 8 miles (13 km), Jeanerette, 14 miles (23 km), and New Iberia, 25 miles (40 km), both located in Iberia Parish. Both LA-182 and U.S. Highway 90 (future Interstate 49) both head to northwest to Lafayette, 47 miles (76 km), and southeast to Morgan City, 26 miles (42 km).

=== Climate ===
Franklin has a humid subtropical climate (Köppen: Cfa) with hot summers and mild winters.

Climate data for Franklin 3 NW, Louisiana (1991–2020 normals, extremes 1893–2024)
Month	Jan	Feb	Mar	Apr	May	Jun	Jul	Aug	Sep	Oct	Nov	Dec	Year
Record high °F (°C)	87 (31)	90 (32)	94 (34)	95 (35)	99 (37)	104 (40)	100 (38)	102 (39)	100 (38)	98 (37)	89 (32)	87 (31)	104 (40)
Mean maximum °F (°C)	75.3 (24.1)	77.1 (25.1)	80.4 (26.9)	84.1 (28.9)	88.9 (31.6)	92.2 (33.4)	93.6 (34.2)	94.0 (34.4)	92.1 (33.4)	88.0 (31.1)	82.1 (27.8)	77.7 (25.4)	94.9 (34.9)
Mean daily maximum °F (°C)	62.7 (17.1)	66.7 (19.3)	72.4 (22.4)	77.9 (25.5)	83.9 (28.8)	88.4 (31.3)	89.8 (32.1)	90.2 (32.3)	87.3 (30.7)	80.4 (26.9)	71.5 (21.9)	65.0 (18.3)	78.0 (25.6)
Daily mean °F (°C)	53.2 (11.8)	57.1 (13.9)	62.6 (17.0)	68.4 (20.2)	75.4 (24.1)	80.4 (26.9)	82.0 (27.8)	82.0 (27.8)	78.6 (25.9)	70.3 (21.3)	60.8 (16.0)	55.2 (12.9)	68.8 (20.4)
Mean daily minimum °F (°C)	43.7 (6.5)	47.5 (8.6)	52.8 (11.6)	59.0 (15.0)	66.8 (19.3)	72.4 (22.4)	74.2 (23.4)	73.9 (23.3)	70.0 (21.1)	60.2 (15.7)	50.1 (10.1)	45.5 (7.5)	59.7 (15.4)
Mean minimum °F (°C)	27.2 (−2.7)	32.4 (0.2)	35.9 (2.2)	43.8 (6.6)	54.9 (12.7)	65.6 (18.7)	70.1 (21.2)	68.8 (20.4)	58.5 (14.7)	44.0 (6.7)	34.2 (1.2)	30.3 (−0.9)	25.4 (−3.7)
Record low °F (°C)	12 (−11)	8 (−13)	22 (−6)	33 (1)	43 (6)	54 (12)	60 (16)	59 (15)	44 (7)	31 (−1)	23 (−5)	10 (−12)	8 (−13)
Average precipitation inches (mm)	5.63 (143)	4.00 (102)	4.02 (102)	4.67 (119)	4.68 (119)	7.63 (194)	8.01 (203)	7.62 (194)	5.59 (142)	4.26 (108)	4.22 (107)	4.94 (125)	65.27 (1,658)
Average precipitation days (≥ 0.01 in)	9.1	8.4	7.1	6.6	7.5	12.3	14.1	13.5	10.6	6.8	7.0	8.6	111.6
Source: NOAA

== Demographics ==
Historical population
Census	Pop.	Note	%±
1850	891		—
1870	1,265		—
1880	1,702		34.5%
1890	2,127		25.0%
1900	2,692		26.6%
1910	3,857		43.3%
1920	3,504		−9.2%
1930	3,271		−6.6%
1940	4,274		30.7%
1950	6,144		43.8%
1960	8,673		41.2%
1970	9,325		7.5%
1980	9,584		2.8%
1990	9,004		−6.1%
2000	8,354		−7.2%
2010	7,660		−8.3%
2020	6,728		−12.2%
2025 (est.)	6,224	▼	−7.5%
U.S. Decennial Census

Franklin racial composition as of 2020
Race	Number	Percentage
White (non-Hispanic)	2,389	35.51%
Black or African American (non-Hispanic)	3,700	54.99%
Native American	53	0.79%
Asian	39	0.58%
Other/Mixed	247	3.67%
Hispanic or Latino	300	4.46%

As of the 2020 United States census, there were 6,728 people, 2,743 households, and 1,466 families residing in the city.

== Education ==
St. Mary Parish School Board operates public schools:

Elementary schools:

- W. P. Foster Elementary School
- LaGrange Elementary School

Secondary schools:

- Franklin Junior High School
- Franklin Senior High School

Not Operated by St. Mary Parish School Board:

Private schools:

- St. John Elementary School
- Hanson Memorial High School

== Media ==
Movies filmed in Franklin, Louisiana include:

- Easy Rider (1969)
- The Drowning Pool (1975)
- All the King's Men (2006)

== Notable people ==
=== Actors ===
- Ned Romero, actor
- Jerome Bonaparte "Black Jack" Ward, actor who appeared in over 140 cowboy movies from 1927 to 1946.

=== Politicians and civil service ===
- C. C. Aycock, the only three-term Lieutenant governor in modern Louisiana history; former Speaker of the Louisiana House of Representatives
- Joshua Baker, Governor of Louisiana 1868
- Carl W. Bauer, Member of the Louisiana House of Representatives from 1967 to 1972 and of the Louisiana State Senate from 1972 to 1976
- Ralph Norman Bauer, Speaker of the Louisiana House of Representatives from 1940 to 1948; leader of the impeachment forces in 1929 against Governor Huey Pierce Long, Jr.
- Donelson Caffery, Louisiana State Senator, United States Senator, lieutenant in the Confederate Army
- Patrick T. Caffery, Louisiana State Representative and United States Representative grandson of Donelson Caffery
- Murphy J. Foster, Governor of Louisiana from 1892 to 1900, also a U.S. Senator
- Murphy J. Foster, Jr., Governor of Louisiana from 1996 to 2004; former member of the Louisiana State Senate
- Henry Johnson, Governor of Louisiana from 1824 to 1828, also District Judge for St. Mary Parish 1811
- Alexander Porter (June 24, 1785 – January 13, 1844) was an attorney, politician, and planter in St. Mary Parish who served as U.S. Senator from 1833 to 1837. He had served a term in the Louisiana House from 1816 to 1818, and on the Louisiana Supreme Court from 1821 to 1833. He built Oaklawn Manor.
- Gaston J. Sigur, Jr., Assistant Secretary of State for East Asian and Pacific Affairs under the Reagan Administration
- Jeohn Favors, Assistant Secretary of Homeland Security for Counterterrorism, Threat Prevention, and Law Enforcement Policy under the Biden Administration.

=== Sports ===
- Wallace Francis, football player, wide receiver for the Buffalo Bills and the Atlanta Falcons
- Ernie Ladd, football player for Grambling University under Eddie Robinson, professional career San Diego Chargers, Houston Oilers and Super Bowl Champion Kansas City Chiefs (1970); professional wrestler known as "The Big Cat"
- Leonard Marshall, football player for the New York Giants
- Warren Wells, Pro football player for the Detroit Lions and Oakland Raiders
- John Porche, athletic trainer for the University of Louisiana at Lafayette, inducted into the UL Athletics Hall of Fame for Administration in 2017

== See also ==
- National Register of Historic Places listings in St. Mary Parish, Louisiana
