= St. Mary Parish School Board =

School district in Louisiana, United States

Coordinates: 29.7530°N 91.4308°W

St. Mary Parish Public Schools

Location
- 474 Highway 317; Centerville, Louisiana 70522; United States

District information
- Type: Public
- Motto: Every Student, Every Day
- Grades: PreK–12
- President: Alaina Black
- Vice-president: Dr. Tammie Wilson
- Superintendent: Dr. Rachael Sanders
- Schools: 21
- NCES District ID: 2201620

Students and staff
- Students: 7,153

Other information
- Website: www.stmaryk12.net

St. Mary Parish School Board is a school district headquartered in unincorporated St. Mary Parish, Louisiana, United States.

The district serves St. Mary Parish.

== School board members ==
- District 1 – Guienzy M. Brent
- District 2 – Dr. Tammie L. Wilson (Vice-President)
- District 3 – Lindsey T. Anslem
- District 4 – Debra R. Jones
- District 5 – Ginger S. Griffin
- District 6 – Marilyn P. LaSalle
- District 7 – Lawrence A. Guillory
- District 8 – Chad M. Paradee
- District 9 – Alaina L. Black (President)
- District 10 – Andrew V. Mancuso
- District 11 – Rhonda R. Dennis
- Secretary-Treasurer – Dr. Rachael Sanders (Superintendent)

== Former superintendents ==
- Dr. Buffy S. Fegenbush (2023–2026)
- Dr. Teresa T. Bagwell (2015–2023)
- Dr. Donald Aguillard (2004–2015)
- Lloyd Dressel (1998–2004)
- Stephen Gauthier (1993–1998)
- Edward Payton Jr. (1990–1993)
- Dr. Ronald Perry (1987–1990)
- Evans J. Medine (1970–1987)

== School uniforms ==
Students are required to wear school uniforms.

== Schools ==
=== PreK-12 schools ===
- Centerville School (Centerville)

=== High schools ===
- Berwick High School (Berwick)
- Franklin Senior High School (Franklin)
  - A renovation was planned around 1983.
- Morgan City High School (Morgan City)
- Patterson High School (Patterson)
- West St. Mary High School (Baldwin)

=== 5-8 schools ===
- Patterson Junior High School (Patterson)

=== 6-8 schools ===
- Berwick Junior High School (Berwick)
- B. Edward Boudreaux Middle School (Baldwin)
- Franklin Junior High School (Franklin)
- Morgan City Junior High School (Morgan City)

=== PreK-5 schools ===
- J. S. Aucoin Elementary School (Ameilia)
- W. P. Foster Elementary School (Franklin)
- J. B. Maitland Elementary School (Morgan City)
- M. E. Norman Elementary School (Morgan City)
- Raintree Elementary School (Baldwin)
- Wyandotte Elementary School (Morgan City)
- Bayou Vista Elementary School (Bayou Vista)
- LaGrange Elementary School (Franklin)

=== PreK-4 schools ===
- Hattie A. Watts Elementary School (Patterson)

=== Alternative schools ===
- St. Mary Parish Alternative School (Verdunville)
