= List of plantations in Louisiana =

This is a list of plantations and/or plantation houses in the U.S. state of Louisiana that are National Historic Landmarks, listed on the National Register of Historic Places, listed on a heritage register; or are otherwise significant for their history, their association with significant events or people, or their architecture and design.

== List of plantations ==
Color key	Historic register listing
	National Historic Landmark
	National Register of Historic Places Historic District
	National Register of Historic Places Individual Listing
	Not listed on national or state register

NRHP reference number	Name	Image	Date designated	Town, Parish	Parish	Notes
87000849	Acadia Plantation		May 29, 1987	Thibodaux	Lafourche	Demolished 2010
83000554	Afton Villa Gardens		February 24, 1983	St. Francisville	West Feliciana	House destroyed by fire in 1963. Gardens and ruins open daily, March 1 to June 30 & October 1 to December 1.
91001046	Aillet House		August 9, 1991	Port Allen	West Baton Rouge	Built in 1830; French-Creole Architecture
01000007	Albania Plantation House		January 26, 2001	Jeanerette	Iberia	
	Albemarle Plantation House		Not applicable	Napoleonville	Assumption	Owned and in continuous operation by the original family since 1839.
84001291	Alice Plantation House		June 14, 1984	Jeanerette	Iberia	
00001229	Alice C Plantation House		October 24, 2000	Franklin	St. Mary	
96001263	Allendale Plantation Historic District		November 1, 1996	Port Allen	West Baton Rouge	Founded by Henry Watkins Allen and it was burned to the ground during the American Civil War. The plantation was rebuilt after 1880 by another owner.
	Angola Plantation		Not applicable	Angola	West Feliciana	Had been Francis Routh's cotton plantation; and the land is now part of the Louisiana State Penitentiary.
82000469	Ardoyne Plantation House		November 1, 1982	Houma	Terrebonne	
80004476	Arlington Plantation		October 3, 1980	Lake Providence	East Carroll	
82000457	Arlington Plantation House		October 5, 1982	Franklin	St. Mary	
82004676	Arlington Plantation House		August 11, 1982	Washington	St. Landry	
82002757	Ash Point Plantation House		August 11, 1982	Elm Grove	Bossier	The name on NRHP record is wrong
79001050	Ashland (Belle Helene)		May 4, 1979	Geismar	Ascension	
72000552	Asphodel Plantation		November 15, 1972	Jackson	East Feliciana	Built in 1830, by Benjamin Kendrick. There is also a cemetery on the property.
	Atahoe Plantation		Not applicable	Natchez	Natchitoches	
87000729	Audubon Plantation		May 14, 1987	Baton Rouge	East Baton Rouge	
82000434	Avondale Plantation Home		December 17, 1982	Clinton	East Feliciana	Now the Camp Avondale Scouting campground
07000424	Bagatelle Plantation		May 9, 2007	Sunshine	Iberville	
79001056	Battleground Plantation		May 14, 1979	Sicily Island	Catahoula	
9800142	Bayside Plantation		January 29, 1987	Jeanerette	Iberia	
98001425	Belle Alliance		November 23, 1998	Belle Alliance	Assumption	Italianate and Greek Revival home, built about 1846.
	Belle Grove		Not applicable	White Castle	Iberville	Burned in 1952
79001083	Bennett Plantation House		May 14, 1979	Alexandria	Rapides	
91000705	Bocage Plantation		June 20, 1991	Darrow	Ascension	Built in 1837, possibly designed by James H. Dakin
	Bonnie Glen Plantation		January 11, 1980	New Roads	Pointe Coupee	Built approx. 1825–1830 by Antoine Gosserand. Raised plantation home along False River representing the early Creole Greek Revival period. Privately owned by descendents of the Gosserand
09000931	Boscobel Plantation Cottage		November 18, 2009	Bosco	Ouachita	
79001078	Bosco Plantation House		May 7, 1979	Bosco	Ouachita	
83000527	Bouverans Plantation House		July 21, 1983	Lockport	Lafourche Parish	
80001709	Breston Plantation House		November 22, 1980	Columbia	Caldwell	
83000503	Buckmeadow Plantation House		September 15, 1983	Lake Providence	East Carroll	Delisted December 28, 2015
79001103	Butler-Greenwood Plantation		April 17, 1979	St. Francisville	West Feliciana	
82002754	Calliham Plantation House		July 22, 1982	Hamburg	Avoyelles Parish	
84002859	Calumet Plantation House		October 18, 1984	Patterson	St. Mary	
82002767	Canebrke		August 29, 1982	Ferriday	Concordia	
79001069	Carter Plantation		February 23, 1979	Springfield	Livingston	Built c. 1820 for free man of color Thomas Freeman. During the Civil War, a minor Confederate naval operation was launched here.
	Caspiana Plantation		Not applicable	Caspiana	Caddo	The main house was moved and is now located in Shreveport, and the plantation store is now located in Natchitoches.
92000583	Caspiana Plantation Store		June 5, 1992	Natchitoches	Natchitoches	
88001049	Cedar Bend Plantation		July 14, 1988	Natchez	Natchitoches	
76000965	Cedars Plantation		May 19, 1976	Oak Ridge	Morehouse	
82000442	Chatchie Plantation House		October 25, 1982	Thibodaux	Lafourche	
73000869	Cherokee Plantation		August 14, 1973	Natchez	Natchitoches	
77001519	Chretien Point Plantation		May 26, 1977	Sunset	St. Landry	
85000970	Clarendon Plantation House		May 9, 1985	Evergreen	Avoyelles	Delisted
75000857	Cottage Plantation		March 17, 1975	St. Francisville	West Feliciana	
84000144	Crescent Plantation		October 18, 1984	Tallulah	Madison	
73000868	Darby Plantation		March 26, 1973	New Iberia	Iberia	Delisted: Burned down and replaced with replica.
86001054	Desire Plantation House		May 15, 1986	Vacherie	St. James	Built circa 1835, French Creole perique tobacco plantation. Private.
73002132	Destrehan Plantation		March 20, 1973	Destrehan	St. Charles	Completed in 1790, the site of a tribunal after 1811 German Coast Uprising, the largest slave rebellion in U.S. history. Restored by a nonprofit organization and open to the public.
87000851	Dixie Plantation		May 29, 1987	Franklin	St. Mary Parish	
85002759	Ducros Plantation		November 7, 1985	Schriever	Terrebonne	
94000742	Dulcito Plantation House		July 22, 1994	New Iberia	Iberia	
82002791	El Dorado Plantation House		March 24, 1982	Livonia	Pointe Coupee	
88003135	Emilie Plantation		January 13, 1989	Garyville	St. John the Baptist Parish	
75000848	Enterprise Plantation		March 17, 1975	Jeanerette	Iberia	
91001386	Evergreen Plantation		April 27, 1992	Wallace; 30.02690°N 90.63958°W	St. John the Baptist	Composed of 39 buildings, Evergreen Plantation is an intact major antebellum plantation complex of the Southern United States. Open to visitors.
88000102	Fairhaven Plantation House		February 11, 1988	Zachary	East Baton Rouge	
93000821	Fairview Plantation House		August 12, 1993	Ethel	East Feliciana	
10000062	Felicity Plantation		March 8, 2010	Vacherie	St. James	Sister plantation to St. Joseph Plantation, built circa 1850 and privately owned.
80001712	Frogmore Plantation		May 31, 1980	Ferriday	Concordia	Established circa 1815, Frogmore Plantation has a steam-powered cotton gin.
82004674	Frozard Plantation House		August 12, 1982	Grand Coteau	St. Landry	
93001548	Godchaux–Reserve Plantation		January 21, 1994	Reserve	St. John the Baptist	
97000967	Gracelane Plantation House		August 29, 1997	Baton Rouge	East Baton Rouge	
92000510	Graugnard Farms Plantation House		May 14, 1992	St. James	St. James	
82000451	Harlem Plantation House		October 26, 1982	Pointe à la Hache	Plaquemines	
98001422	Hermione Plantation House		November 23, 1998	Tallulah	Madison	Relocated from Kell Plantation in rural Madison Parish
78001438	Hazelwood Plantation		July 31, 1978	Laurel Hill	West Feliciana	
86003129	Homestead Plantation Complex		November 6, 1986	Plaquemine		
70000842	Homeplace Plantation House	1940 HABS photo	April 15, 1970	Hahnville; 29.97105°N 90.40758°W	St. Charles	Built circa 1790, large French Colonial raised cottage. Not open to the public.
04001470	Hope Plantation House		January 11, 2005	Garyville	St. John the Baptist	
80001694	The Houmas		September 27, 1980	Burnside	Ascension	
92001529	Indian Camp Plantation		November 18, 1992	Carville	Iberville	Listed as the "Carville Historic District"
87002449	Inglewood Plantation Historic District		January 14, 1988	Alexandria	Rapides	
01000669	Katie Plantation House		June 29, 2001	Breaux Bridge	St. Martin Parish	
06000317	Kenilworth Plantation House		April 24, 2006	St. Bernard	St. Bernard	
71000362	Kent Plantation House		August 5, 1971	Alexandria	Rapides	
99000235	Killarney		February 18, 1999	Ferriday	Concordia	Also known as Alabama Plantation
84000145	LaBranche Plantation Dependency		October 18, 1984	St. Rose	St. Charles	
02001296	Landry Plantation House		November 8, 2002	Youngsville	Lafayette	
93000322	Lane Plantation		April 22, 1993	Ethel	East Feliciana	
92001842	Laura Plantation		February 3, 1993	Vacherie	St. James	Plantation heiress and manager Laura Lacoul Gore's (1861–1963) autobiography tells the family's history and her experience living at the plantation. Open to the public.
78001426	Laurel Valley Sugar Plantation		March 24, 1978	Thibodaux	Lafourche	
93000694	LeBeuf Plantation House		July 29, 1993	New Orleans	Orleans	
	Leonard Plantation		Not applicable	Algiers	Orleans	Located at Patterson Street and Merrill Street, and noted for its productive truck gardens. Ravaged by Hurricane Betsy in 1965 and dismantled several years later. Also known as Webert Plantation.
94000705	Linwood Plantation Manager's House		September 23, 1994	Newellton	Tensas	
79001057	Lisburn Plantation House		July 26, 1979	Ferriday	Concordia	
77000680	Live Oak Plantation		March 11, 1977	Weyanoke	West Feliciana	
74000924	Live Oaks Plantation		November 20, 1974	Rosedale	Iberville	
80001748	Logtown Plantation		October 16, 1980	Monroe	Ouachita	
77000678	Loyd Hall Plantation		April 29, 1977	Cheneyville	Rapides	
02001603	Lucky Plantation House		December 27, 2002	Sunshine	Iberville Parish	
73000860	Madewood Plantation House		May 4, 1983	Napoleonville; 29.92738°N 90.99426°W	Assumption	
83000548	Magnolia Plantation		January 3, 1998	Schriever; 29.714722°N 90.818889°W	Terrebonne	
79001071	Magnolia Plantation	HABS photo	January 3, 2001	Derry; 31.55294°N 92.94240°W	Natchitoches	
86000253	Magnolia Lane		February 13, 1986	Westwego; 29.94986°N 90.1533°W	Jefferson	
72000549	Magnolia Mound Plantation House		September 7, 1972	Baton Rouge	East Baton Rouge	
87002135	Marengo Plantation House		December 14, 1987	Jonesville	Catahoula	
98000394	Marengo Plantation		April 23, 1998	Cinclare	West Baton Rouge	Listed as "Cinclare Sugar Mill Historic District"
83000533	Mary Plantation House		July 13, 1983	Braithwaite	Plaquemines	
72000556	Melrose Plantation	HABS photo	May 30, 1974	Melrose; 31.08771°N 92.96756°W	Natchitoches	
80001769	Monte Vista Plantation House		June 9, 1980	Port Allen	West Baton Rouge Parish	
87002505	Montegut Plantation House		January 21, 1988	LaPlace	St. John the Baptist Parish	
82000444	Montrose Plantation House		October 5, 1982	Tallulah	Madison	
82000468	Moro Plantation House		October 5, 1982	Waterproof	Tensas	
06000779	Moss Grove Plantation House		September 6, 2006	Jonesville	Catahoula Parish	
76002167	Moundville Plantation House		December 12, 1976	Washington	St. Landry Parish	
80001717	Mount Hope Plantation House		December 3, 1980	Baton Rouge	East Baton Rouge	
79001094	Myrtle Grove Plantation		May 10, 1979	Waterproof	Tensas	
74002185	Myrtle Hill Plantation House		December 4, 1974	Gloster	DeSoto Parish	
78001439	Myrtles Plantation		September 6, 1978	St. Francisville	West Feliciana	
76000966	Narcisse Prudhomme Plantation		July 13, 1976	Bermuda	Natchitoches Parish	
85000976	Narrows Plantation House		May 9, 1985	Lake Arthur	Jefferson Davis	
80001733	Nottoway Plantation House		June 6, 1980	White Castle	Iberville	Destroyed by fire on May 15, 2025. Initially a small blaze in the south wing, the fire later reignited and consumed the remaining structure.
74002187	Oak Alley Plantation		December 2, 1974	Vacherie; 30.00427°N 90.77593°W	St. James	
92000036	Oak Grove Plantation Dependencies		February 13, 1992	St. Francisville	West Feliciana	
	Oakland Plantation	HABS photo		Haughton	Bossier	
79001073	Oakland Plantation	HABS photo	January 3, 2001	Natchez; 31.66500°N 93.00333°W	Natchitoches	
80001720	Oakland Plantation House		October 3, 1980	Gurley	East Feliciana	
73002162	Oaklawn Manor		March 30, 1973	Franklin	St. Mary	Plantation home of U.S. Senator Alexander Porter.
79001072	Oaklawn Plantation		March 28, 1979	Natchez	Natchitoches	
73000878	Oakley Plantation		January 25, 1973	St. Francisville	West Feliciana	John James Audubon worked here as an art tutor in 1821 & painted 32 of his Birds of America. Open as the Audubon State Historic Site.
80001697	Oakwold Plantation House		July 23, 1980	Evergreen	Avoyelles Parish	Sam Houston visited while in the area soliciting funds for his Texas army.
80001764	Orange Grove Plantation House		March 26, 1980	Houma	Terrebonne	Circa-1840 Greek Revival briquette-entre-poteaux architecture; operates as an inn today. See Orange Grove Plantation House.
90001748	Ormond Plantation House		November 11, 1990	Destrehan	St. Charles	
77000665	Palo Alto Plantation		April 13, 1977	Donaldsonville	Ascension	
70000258	Parlange Plantation	1936 HABS photo	May 30, 1974	Mix; 31.66500°N 93.00333°W	Pointe Coupee	
03001064	Pegram Plantation House		October 24, 2003	Lecompte	Rapides	
71000360	Pitot House		September 28, 1971	New Orleans	Orleans	Built in the late 18th century in what then was outside of the city, home to Mayor James Pitot. Restored and open to the public.
84001347	Pleasant View Plantation House		April 5, 1984	Oscar	Pointe Coupee	
80004251	Judge Poché Plantation House		December 3, 1980	Convent	St. James	
87002136	Poplar Grove Plantation		December 14, 1987	Port Allen	West Baton Rouge	Former sugar plantation from the 1820s, manor house built in 1884 for the 1884 World's Industrial and Cotton Centennial Exposition in New Orleans.
01000943	Residence Plantation House		September 8, 2001	Houma	Terrebonne	
79001064	Richland Plantation		March 28, 1979	Norwood	East Feliciana	
80001736	Rienzi Plantation House		May 31, 1980	Thibodaux	Lafourche	Not open for tours
80001771	Rosale Plantation		December 8, 1980	St. Francisville	West Feliciana	
76000974	Rosalie Plantation Sugar Mill		January 2, 1976	Alexandria	Rapides	
73000880	Rosebank Plantation House		April 13, 1973	Weyanoke	West Feliciana	
01000765	Rosedown	1934 HABS photo	April 5, 2005	St. Francisville; 30.79602°N 91.37095°W	West Feliciana	
85003002	Roseland Plantation House		October 10, 1985	Ferriday	Concordia Parish	
99001039	Sandbar Plantation House		September 2, 1999	Port Allen	West Baton Rouge Parish	
74002186	San Francisco Plantation House		May 30, 1974	Reserve; 30.04753°N 90.60554°W	St. John the Baptist Parish	Open for tours
78003448	Santa Maria Plantation House		December 29, 1978	Baton Rouge	East Baton Rouge	
82000445	Scottland Plantation House		November 2, 1982	Tallulah	Madison	
86001495	Sebastopol Plantation House		August 13, 1986	St. Bernard	St. Bernard	
72000553	Shadows-on-the-Teche	1938 HABS photo	May 30, 1974	New Iberia; 30.00254°N 91.81499°W	Iberia	Greek Revival home completed in 1834 by planters David & Mary Weeks, within New Iberia. William Weeks Hall left the building to the National Trust for Historic Preservation in 1958. Open for tours.
	Shadowlawn Plantation		Not applicable	Franklin; 29.79407°N 91.50087°W	St. Mary	Greek Revival home completed in 1833 by Simeon Smith. Open for tours and events.
95000387	Smithfield Plantation House		April 7, 1995	Port Allen	West Baton Rouge	
83000558	Solitude Plantation House		January 27, 1983	St. Francisville	West Feliciana	
74002188	Southdown Plantation		January 18, 1974	Houma	Terrebonne	
80001695	St. Emma		June 30, 1980	Donaldsonville	Assumption	Circa-1850 home on former sugar plantation, scene of a Civil War skirmish in 1862.
82000470	St. George Plantation House		October 5, 1982	Schriever	Terrebonne	
05000987	St. Joseph Plantation House		September 6, 2005	Vacherie	St. James	Early 19th-century plantation, joined in 1890 with Felicity Plantation to form the St. Joseph Plantation & Manufacturing Company. Privately owned.
75000849	St. Louis Plantation		December 3, 1975	Plaquemine	Iberville	Italianate and Greek Revival style home on a working sugar cane plantation; owned by the same family for 150+ years, named for the city in Missouri. Private.
79001104	St. Maurice Plantation		April 3, 1979	St. Maurice	Pointe Coupee	
03000680	Star Hill Plantation Dependency		July 24, 2003	Star Hill	West Feliciana	Also known as Star Hill Billiard Hall.
98000570	Stephanie Plantation House		May 20, 1998	Arnaudville	St. Landry, St. Martin	
82000432	Synope Plantation House		October 5, 1982	Columbia	Caldwell	
79001059	Tacony Plantation House		April 19, 1979	Vidalia	Concordia	
80001731	Tally-Ho Plantation House		January 20, 1980	Bayou Goula	Iberville	
99000257	Trio Plantation House		February 26, 1999	Rayville	Richland	
	Uncle Sam Plantation		Not applicable	Convent	St. James	
02000297	Valverda Plantation House		April 1, 2002	Maringouin	Pointe Coupee	
77000677	White Hall Plantation House		May 26, 1977	Lettsworth	Pointe Coupee	
87001475	Whitehall Plantation House		September 8, 1987	Monroe	Ouachita	
92001566	Whitney Plantation Historic District		November 24, 1992	Wallace	St. John the Baptist	Site of a slavery museum, opened to the public in December 2014. French colonial main house dates from 1803.
88000977	Wildwood Plantation House		June 30, 1988	Jackson	East Feliciana	
98000702	Woodland Plantation		June 18, 1998	West Pointe à la Hache	Plaquemines	

== Historical background of the plantation era ==
Upland or green seeded cotton was not a commercially important crop until the invention of an improved cotton gin in 1793. With an inexpensive cotton gin a man could remove seed from as much cotton in one day as a woman could de-seed in two months working at a rate of about one pound per day. The newly mechanized cotton industry in England during the Industrial Revolution absorbed the tremendous supply of cheap cotton that became a major crop in the Southern United States.

At the time of the cotton gin's invention, the sub tropical soils in the Eastern United States were becoming depleted, and the fertilizer deposits of guano deposits of South America and the Pacific Islands along with the nitrate deposits in the Chilean deserts were not yet being exploited, meaning that there were fertilizer shortages, leading to a decline in agriculture in the Southeast and a westward expansion to new land.

Transportation at the time was extremely limited. There were almost no improved roads in the U.S. or in the Louisiana Territory and the first railroads were not built until the 1830s. The only practical means for shipping agricultural products more than a few miles without exceeding their value was by water. This made much of the land in the U.S. unsuitable for growing crops other than for local consumption.

Under ownership of Spain, the city of New Orleans held the strategically important location between the Mississippi River and Lake Pontchartrain. The Carondelet Canal, which was completed in 1794, connected the Tremé section of New Orleans with Bayou St. John, giving shipping access to Lake Pontchartrain as an alternative route to the Gulf of Mexico. The U.S. gained rights to use the New Orleans port in 1795.

Louisiana (New Spain) was transferred by Spain to France in 1800, but it remained under Spanish administration until a few months before the Louisiana Purchase. The huge swath of territory purchased from Napoleon Bonaparte in 1803 was sparsely populated. During the Thomas Jefferson Presidency, a high priority was to build roads to New Orleans, specifically the Natchez Trace and the Federal Road through Georgia, initially intended to facilitate mail delivery.

The Napoleonic Wars and the Embargo Act of 1807 restricted European trade, which did not recover until the end of the War of 1812 in 1815. The Year Without a Summer of 1816 resulted in famine in Europe and a wave of immigration to the U.S., with New Orleans being the destination of many refugees. The return of good harvests in Europe along, with the newly cleared and planted land in the Midwest and Mississippi River Valley and improvements in transportation, resulted in a collapse in agricultural prices that caused the 1818–19 depression. Agricultural commodity prices remained depressed for many years, but their eventual recovery resulted in a new wave of land clearing, which in turn triggered another depression in the late 1830s. Cotton prices were particularly depressed.

Until the development of the steamboat, transportation of goods on major rivers was generally accomplished either with barges or flatboats, floated downstream or pushed upstream with poles or by hand using overhanging tree limbs. On the Mississippi River, most shipping was down river on log rafts or wooden boats that were dismantled and sold as lumber in the vicinity of New Orleans. Steam-powered river navigation began in 1811–12, between Pittsburgh, Pennsylvania, and New Orleans. Inland steam navigation rapidly expanded in the following decades. Railroads appeared before the Civil War, though at first were used to link waterways. After the Civil War, railroads took over most of the hauling of goods.

It was during the period of expanding steam transportation that plantation agriculture dominated the Southern economy, with two-thirds of the millionaires in the U.S. living in Louisiana, mostly between Natchez, Mississippi, and New Orleans. The surviving plantation homes range from relatively modest dwellings to opulent mansions, some containing original furnishings and many with period furniture.

Due to poor transportation and slow industrialization, plantations tended to be somewhat self-sufficient, growing most of their own food, harvesting their own timber and firewood, repairing farm implements, and constructing their own buildings. Many slaves were skilled blacksmiths, masons, and carpenters who were often contracted out. Cloth, shoes, and clothing were imported from Europe and from the Northeast U.S.

The self-sufficiency of plantations and cheap slave labor hindered economic development of the South. Contemporary descriptions cite the lack of towns, commerce, and economic development.

Besides the necessity of river transportation, the ground near the rivers and old river channels contained the best agricultural land, where the sandy and silty soil settled, increasing the height of the natural levees. The clay soil settled farther away from the rivers and being less stable, it slumped to muddy back-swamps. The plantations in the vicinity of St. Francisville, Louisiana, are on a high bluff on the east side of the Mississippi River with loess soil, which was not as fertile as the river alluvium, but was relatively well-suited to plantation agriculture.

== Slave housing ==
Examples of slave housing can be found on many of the extant plantation complexes. Historically housing for enslaved people on Louisiana plantations (prior to the reconstruction era), featured cabins consisting of two rooms, with one family in each room. After the American Civil War in 1865, the United States of America had abolished slavery, and the architecture changed for laborers on plantations to include more space, one example of this is found at the Allendale Plantation in Port Allen.

Other notable examples of slave housing can be found at the Laura Plantation in Vacherie and at the San Francisco Plantation House in Garyville.

Historical images of slave quarters

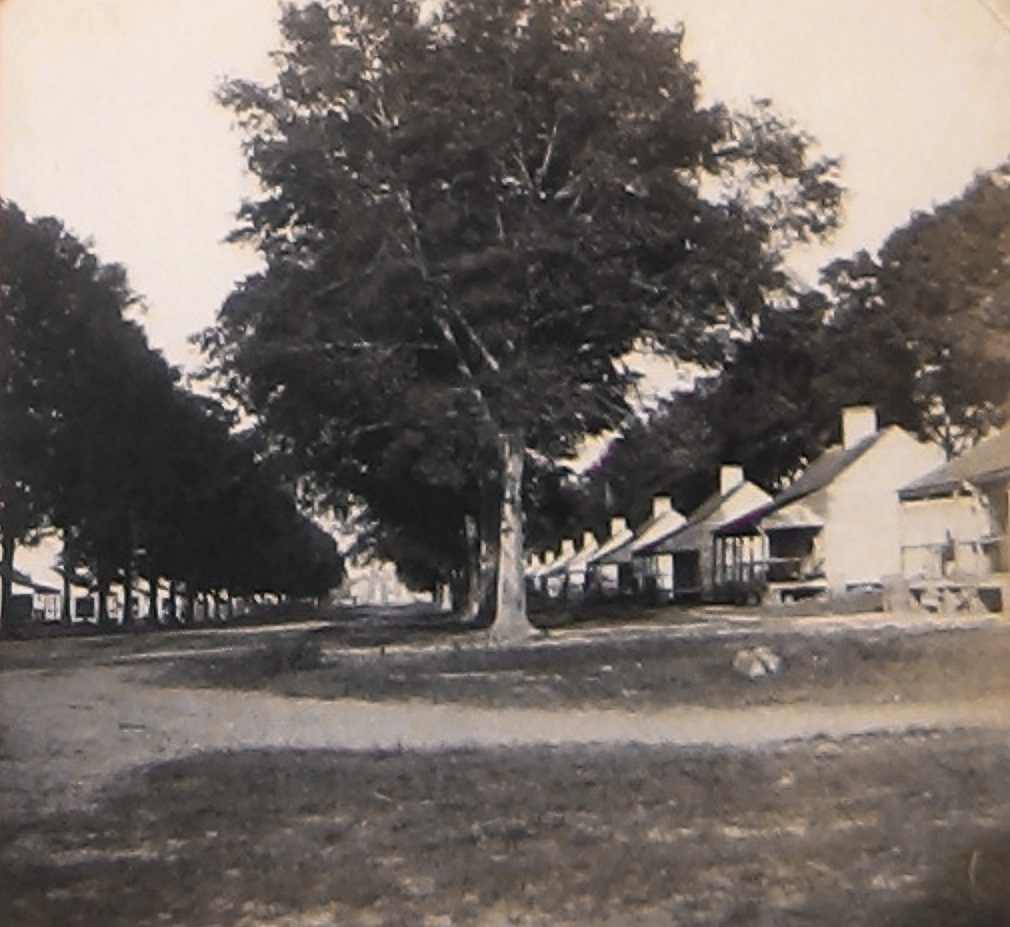
Slave quarters in Louisiana, unknown plantation (c. 1880s)

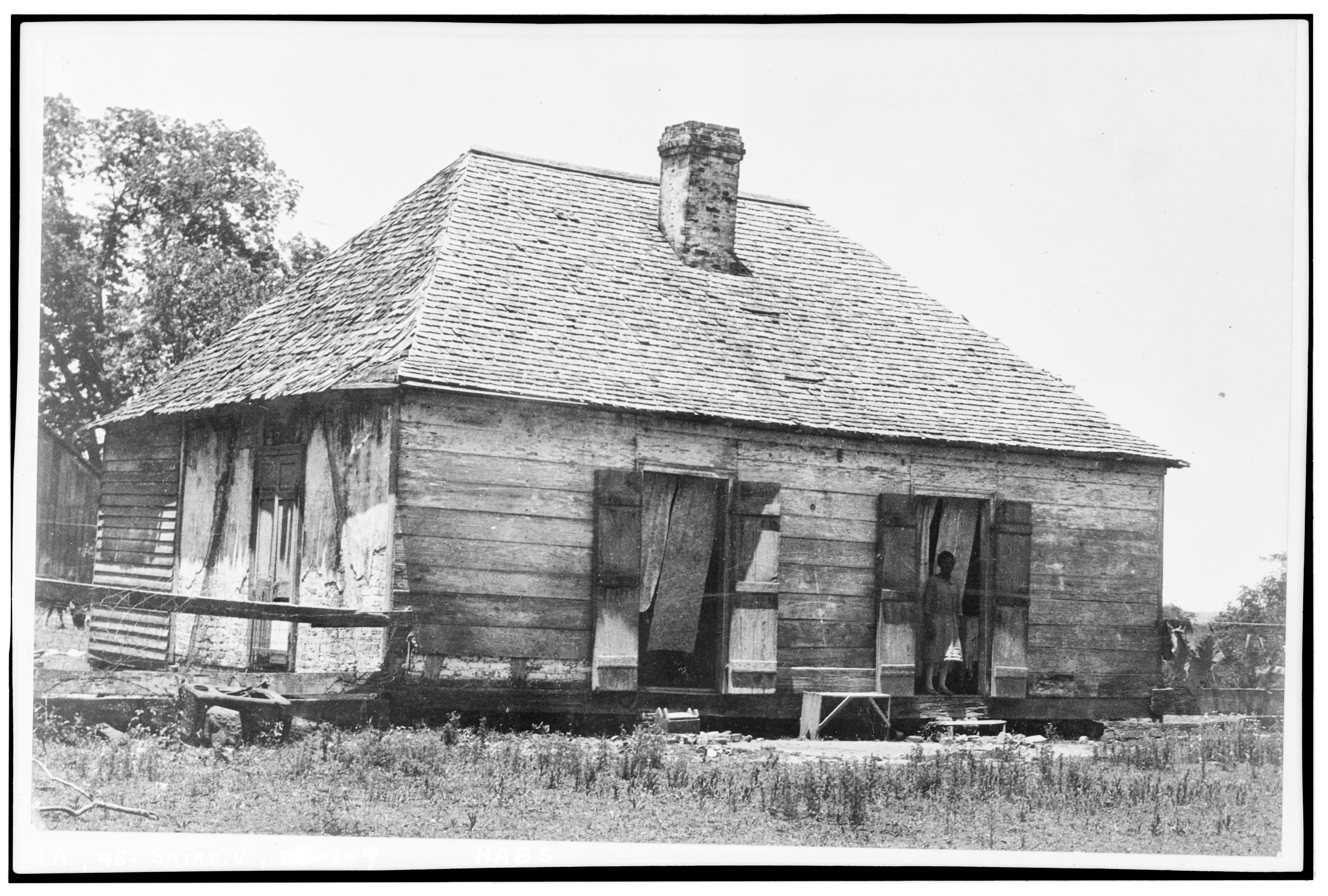
Barbara Plantation (1927)

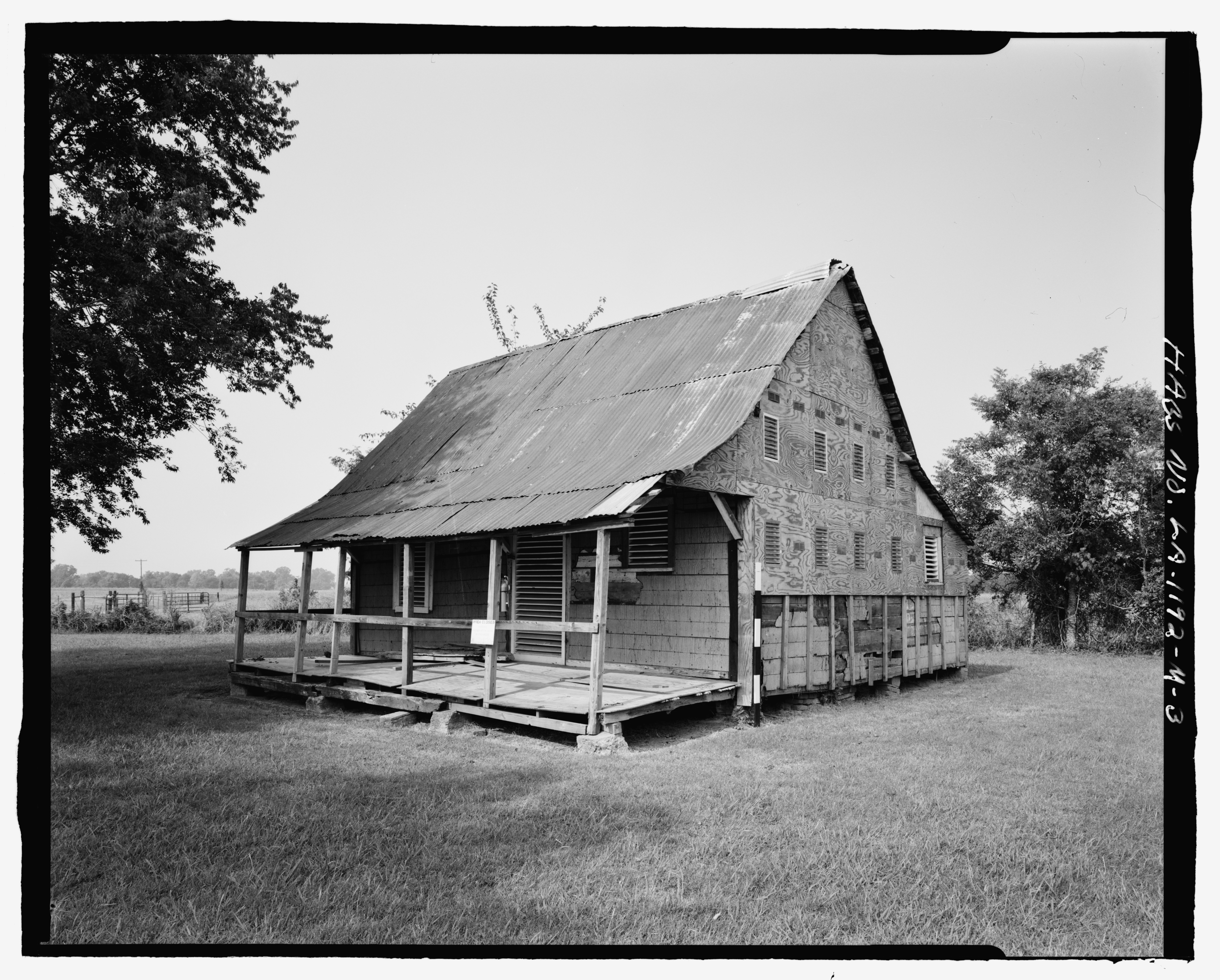
Oakland Plantation (c. 1933)

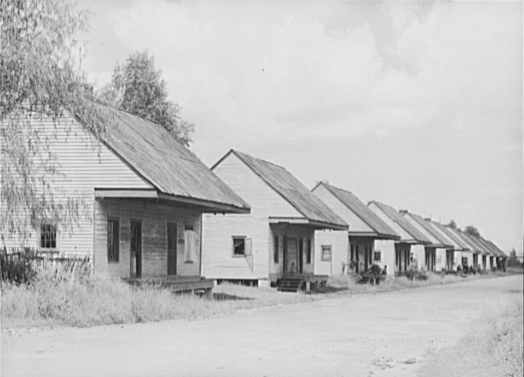
Destrehan Plantation (1938)
Modern images of slave quarters

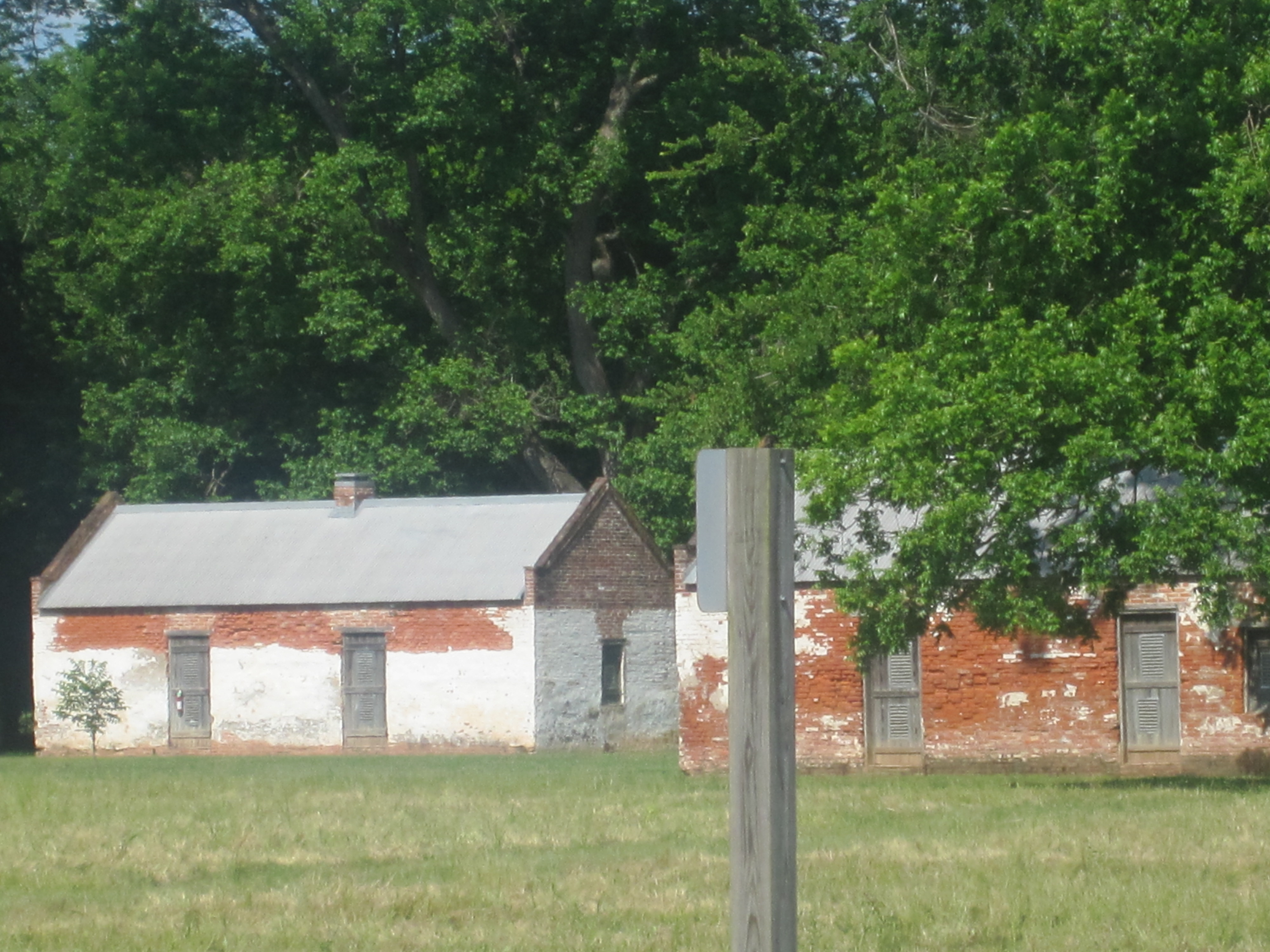
Magnolia Plantation (2010)

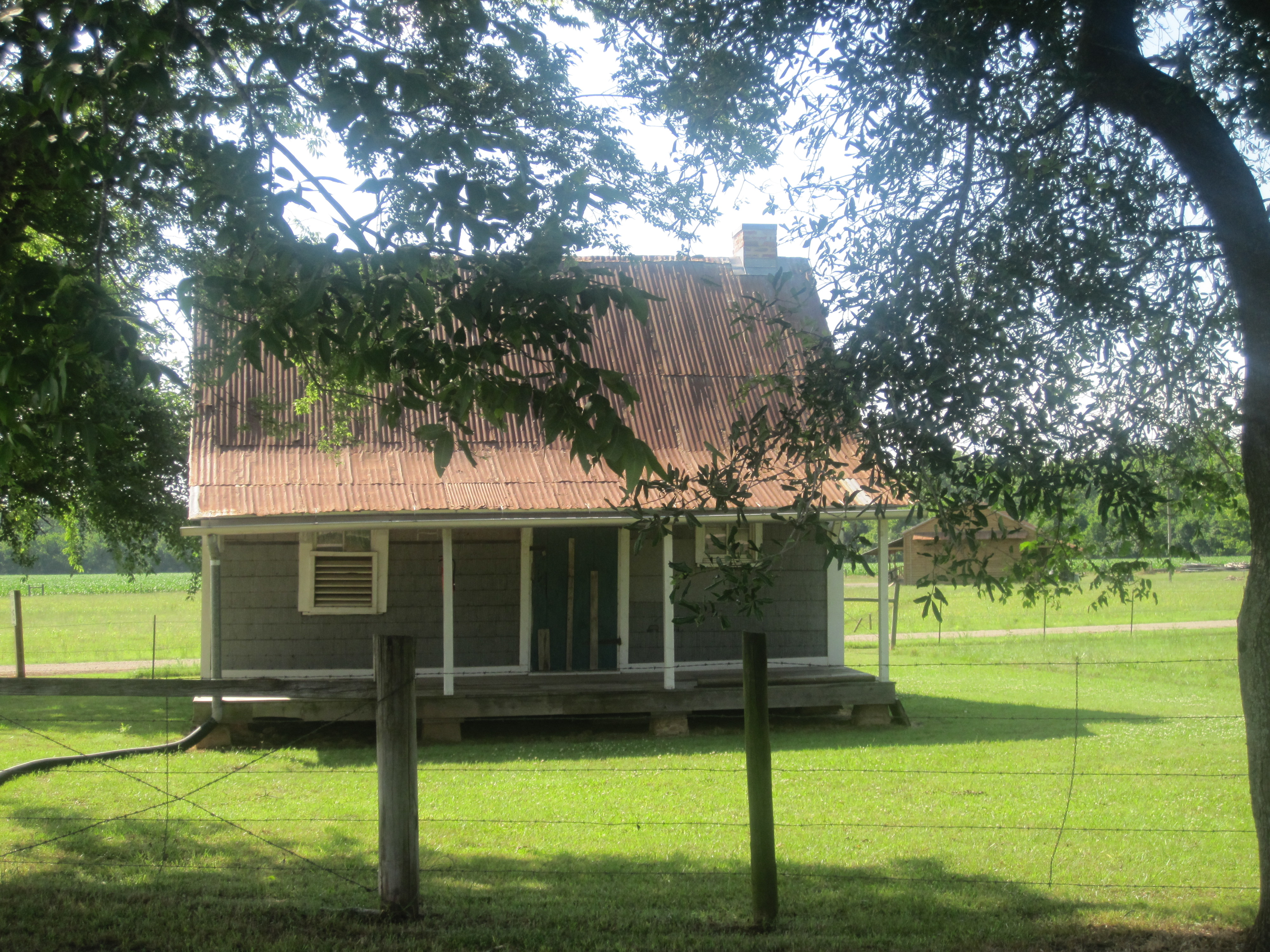
Oakland Plantation (2010)

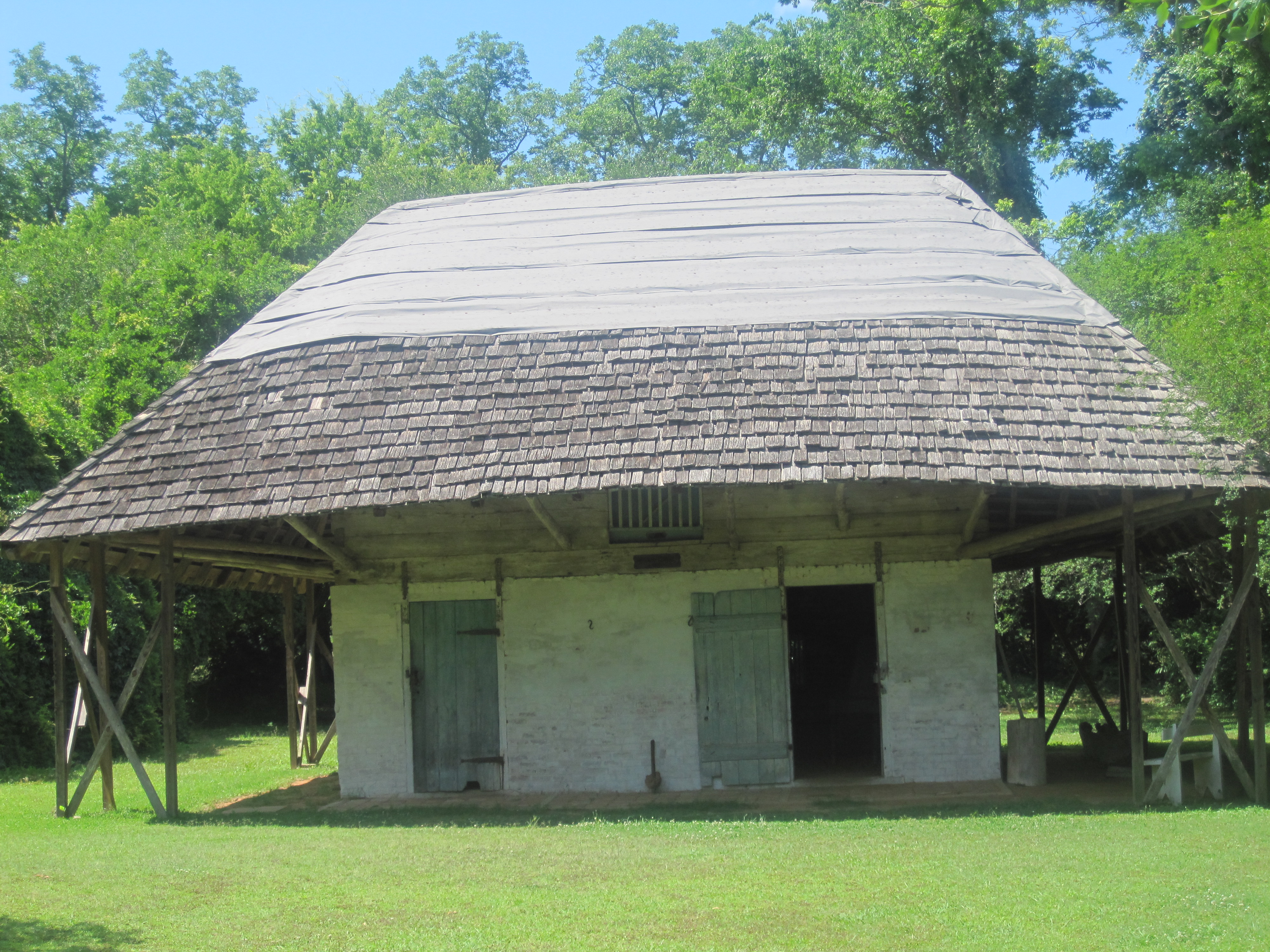
Melrose Plantation (2010)

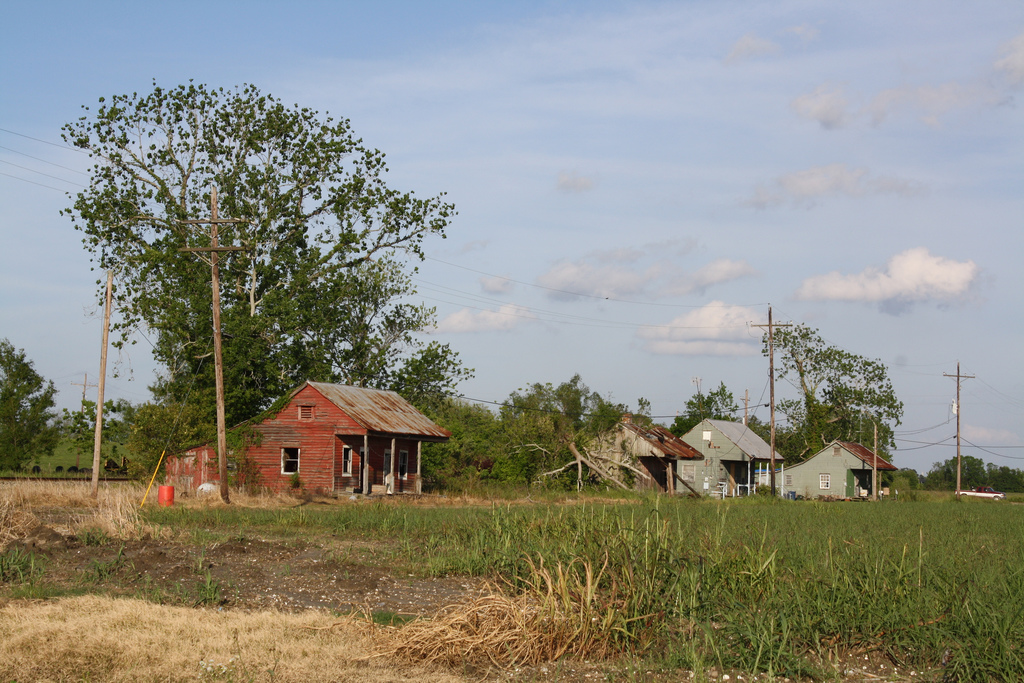
Allendale Plantation (2012)

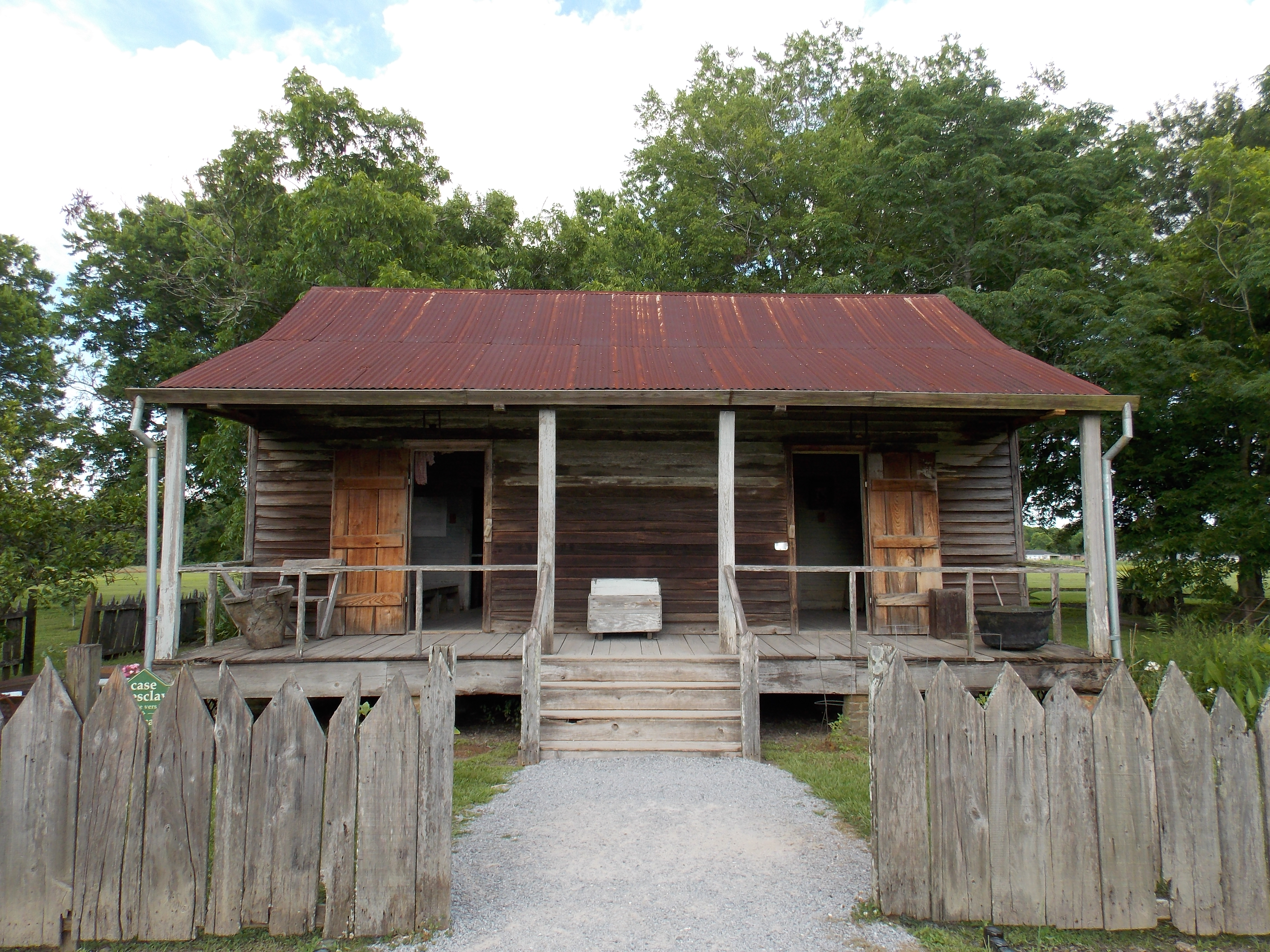
Laura Plantation (2014)

== See also ==
- History of slavery in Louisiana
- History of Louisiana
- List of plantations in the United States
- Plantations in the American South
- Plantation complexes in the Southeastern United States
