= National Register of Historic Places listings in Tensas Parish, Louisiana =

Location of Tensas Parish in Louisiana

This is a list of the National Register of Historic Places listings in Tensas Parish, Louisiana.

This is intended to be a complete list of the properties on the National Register of Historic Places in Tensas Parish, Louisiana, United States. The locations of National Register properties for which the latitude and longitude coordinates are included below, may be seen in a map.

There are 10 properties listed on the National Register in the parish. One property was once listed, but has since been removed.

This National Park Service list is complete through NPS recent listings posted December 12, 2025.

== Current listings ==
	Name on the Register	Image	Date listed	Location	City or town	Description
1	The Burn	The Burn	August 11, 1982 (#82002798)	North of Waterproof off Louisiana Highway 65; 31°50′26″N 91°23′08″W	Waterproof	
2	Lakewood	Lakewood	March 24, 1983 (#83000547)	North of St. Joseph on Louisiana Highway 606; 31°57′57″N 91°12′30″W	St. Joseph	
3	Linwood Plantation Manager's House	Linwood Plantation Manager's House	September 23, 1994 (#94000705)	Louisiana Highway 608 5 miles southeast of Newellton; 32°01′42″N 91°10′36″W	Newellton	
4	Moro Plantation House	Moro Plantation House	October 5, 1982 (#82000468)	West of Waterproof off Louisiana Highway 566; 31°48′54″N 91°25′55″W	Waterproof	
5	Myrtle Grove Plantation	Myrtle Grove Plantation	May 10, 1979 (#79001094)	Louisiana Highway 568; 31°48′47″N 91°22′07″W	Waterproof	
6	Routhwood Elementary School	Routhwood Elementary School	October 6, 2015 (#15000698)	217 Lombardo St. 32°04′19″N 91°14′21″W	Newellton	
7	St. Joseph Historic District	St. Joseph Historic District	December 10, 1980 (#80001763)	Roughly bounded by Panola Ave. and Front, Hickory, 4th, and Pauline Sts. 31°54′58″N 91°14′10″W	St. Joseph	
8	Tensas Parish Courthouse	Tensas Parish Courthouse	March 30, 1979 (#79001093)	Courthouse Sq. 31°54′48″N 91°14′09″W	St. Joseph	
9	Waterproof High School	Waterproof High School	April 1, 2002 (#02000296)	Main St., between Church Ln. and Mississippi St. 31°49′N 91°23′W	Waterproof	
10	Winter Quarters	Winter Quarters	November 21, 1978 (#78001437)	6 miles (9.6 km) southeast of Newellton on Louisiana Highway 608; 32°01′06″N 91°09′35″W	Newellton	

== Former listing ==
	Name on the Register	Image	Date listed	Date removed	Location	City or town	Description
1	Bank of Newellton	Bank of Newellton	June 2, 2000 (#00000613)	May 3, 2016	207 N. Main St. 32°04′38″N 91°14′08″W	Newellton	

== See also ==
- List of National Historic Landmarks in Louisiana
- National Register of Historic Places listings in Louisiana
