= National Register of Historic Places listings in Terrebonne Parish, Louisiana =

Location of Terrebonne Parish in Louisiana

This is a list of the National Register of Historic Places listings in Terrebonne Parish, Louisiana.

This is intended to be a complete list of the properties and districts on the National Register of Historic Places in Terrebonne Parish, Louisiana, United States. The locations of National Register properties and districts for which the latitude and longitude coordinates are included below, may be seen in a map.

There are 23 properties and districts listed on the National Register in the parish. Another property was once listed but has been removed.

This National Park Service list is complete through NPS recent listings posted July 31, 2026.

== Current listings ==
	Name on the Register	Image	Date listed	Location	City or town	Description
1	Ardoyne Plantation House	Ardoyne Plantation House	November 1, 1982 (#82000469)	Northwest of Houma on Louisiana Highway 311; 29°38′57″N 90°49′10″W	Houma vicinity	
2	Argyle	Argyle	July 1, 1994 (#94000657)	3313 Bayou Black Dr. 29°34′22″N 90°45′04″W	Houma	
3	Armitage	Armitage	April 12, 1984 (#84001366)	Louisiana Highway 20 and Colonial Dr. 29°45′51″N 90°48′59″W	Schriever	
4	Herman Albert Cook House	Herman Albert Cook House	February 24, 1995 (#95000107)	515 W. Main St. 29°35′49″N 90°43′44″W	Houma	
5	Daigleville School		October 21, 2020 (#100005721)	8542 Main St. 29°35′52″N 90°42′08″W	Houma	
6	Ducros Plantation	Ducros Plantation	November 7, 1985 (#85002759)	Louisiana Highway 20; 29°45′13″N 90°49′05″W	Schriever	
7	Fifth District High School	Fifth District High School	June 18, 2018 (#100002590)	918 Roussell St. 29°35′30″N 90°43′18″W	Houma	
8	Gibson Methodist Episcopal Church	Gibson Methodist Episcopal Church	May 8, 1986 (#86001032)	S. Bayou Black Dr. 29°41′06″N 90°59′16″W	Gibson	
9	Houma Elementary School	Houma Elementary School	June 15, 2015 (#15000347)	711 Grinage St. 29°35′33″N 90°43′26″W	Houma	
10	Houma Elks Lodge #1193	Houma Elks Lodge #1193	April 13, 2026 (#100012900)	7883 W. Main Street; 29°35′51″N 90°43′16″W	Houma	
11	Houma Historic District	Houma Historic District	December 8, 1983 (#83003640)	Roughly bounded by E. Park Ave. and Main, Canal, Lafayette, Academy, High, Roussell, and Barrow Sts.; also 7717, 7719, 7725, 7801-09, 7815-17, 7819 W. Main, 407, 425, 507 Rousell, 7910, 7932, 7936, 7942 W. Park Ave. 29°35′50″N 90°43′25″W	Houma	Second set of addresses represents a boundary adjustment, listed October 6, 2015.
12	Houma Water Tower		April 13, 2026 (#100012901)	600 Wood Street; 29°35′40″N 90°43′16″W	Houma	
13	Lapeyrouse Grocery	Lapeyrouse Grocery	October 21, 2020 (#100005699)	7243 Shoreline Dr. 29°18′27″N 90°38′51″W	Chauvin vicinity	
14	Magnolia		August 4, 1983 (#83000548)	Louisiana Highway 311; 29°42′53″N 90°49′08″W	Schriever	
15	Montegut School	Montegut School	October 7, 1993 (#93001036)	1137 Louisiana Highway 55; 29°28′39″N 90°33′20″W	Montegut vicinity	
16	Orange Grove Plantation House	Orange Grove Plantation House	March 26, 1980 (#80001764)	West of Houma on U.S. Route 90; 29°35′19″N 90°49′23″W	Houma vicinity	Circa-1840 Greek Revival briquette-entre-poteaux architecture; operates as an inn today. See Orange Grove Plantation House.
17	Polmer Store	Polmer Store	May 30, 1996 (#96000607)	1849 Louisiana Highway 311; 29°38′32″N 90°48′50″W	Schriever vicinity	
18	S.S. R.M. Parker Jr. (shipwreck and remains)		December 7, 2018 (#100002561)	Address Restricted	Cocodrie vicinity	
19	Residence Plantation House	Residence Plantation House	September 8, 2001 (#01000943)	8951 Park Ave. 29°35′53″N 90°41′21″W	Houma	
20	St. George Plantation House	St. George Plantation House	October 5, 1982 (#82000470)	Louisiana Highway 24; 29°44′20″N 90°48′28″W	Schriever	
21	Clifford Percival Smith House	Clifford Percival Smith House	April 20, 1989 (#89000327)	501 E. Park Ave. 29°35′59″N 90°43′08″W	Houma	
22	Southdown Plantation	Southdown Plantation	January 18, 1974 (#74002188)	1 mile southwest of Houma on Louisiana Highway 311; 29°35′17″N 90°43′52″W	Houma	
23	Wesley House	Wesley House	August 11, 1982 (#82002799)	1210 E. Main St. 29°35′53″N 90°42′34″W	Houma	

== Former listing ==
	Name on the Register	Image	Date listed	Date removed	Location	City or town	Description
1	St. Matthew's Episcopal Church	St. Matthew's Episcopal Church	May 1, 1989 (#89000331)	March 31, 2015	243 Barrow St. 29°35′48″N 90°43′07″W	Houma	St. Matthew's Church was destroyed by fire on November 11, 2010

== See also ==
- List of National Historic Landmarks in Louisiana
- National Register of Historic Places listings in Louisiana
