= Orange Grove =

Orange Grove may refer to:

== General ==
- An orchard of cultivated orange trees, in the United States often called an orange grove

== Places and buildings ==
=== Australia ===
- Orange Grove, New South Wales
- Orange Grove, Western Australia

=== South Africa ===
- Orange Grove, Gauteng, a suburb of Johannesburg

=== United Kingdom ===
- Orange Grove, Bath, a park and street

=== United States ===
==== By state ====
- Orange Grove Boulevard (Pasadena), a major thoroughfare in southern California
  - Orange Grove Court, a bungalow court listed on the NRHP in Pasadena, California
- Orange Grove Plantation (Daytona Beach, Florida), significant in history of Daytona Beach, Florida
- Orange Grove Plantation House (Plaquemines Parish, Louisiana), former Gothic Revival mansion in Plaquemines Parish, Louisiana
- Orange Grove Plantation House (Terrebonne Parish, Louisiana), listed on the NRHP in Terrebonne Parish, Louisiana
- Orange Grove, Mississippi, an area within the city of Gulfport, Mississippi
- Orange Grove Plantation (Saint Helena Island, South Carolina), listed on the NRHP in Beaufort County, South Carolina
- Orange Grove (Dalzell, South Carolina), historic house on the NRHP in Sumter County, South Carolina
- Orange Grove, Texas, a town in Jim Wells County, Texas
- Orangegrove, United States Virgin Islands, on Saint Croix
- Orange Grove, United States Virgin Islands, on Saint Croix

== See also ==
- Orange Grove affair, a political scandal in New South Wales. Australia
- Orange Grove Plantation (disambiguation)
