= Orange Grove Plantation =

Orange Grove Plantation or Orange Grove Plantation House may refer to:

- Orange Grove Plantation (Daytona Beach, Florida), significant in history of Daytona Beach, Florida
- Orange Grove Plantation House (Terrebonne Parish, Louisiana), listed on the National Register of Historic Places (NRHP)
- Orange Grove Plantation House (Plaquemines Parish, Louisiana)
- Orange Grove Plantation (Saint Helena Island, South Carolina), NRHP-listed

== See also ==
- Orange Grove (disambiguation)
