= The Burn =

The Burn may refer to:

== Structures and places ==
- The Burn (Waterproof, Louisiana), a historic plantation mansion listed on the U.S. National Register of Historic Places (NRHP)
- The Burn (Natchez, Mississippi), a historic house, NRHP-listed
- The Burn of Columbia Valley AVA, an American Viticultural Area in the state of Washington

== Arts and entertainment ==
- The Burn (short story collection), a 1991 book by James Kelman
- The Burn with Jeff Ross, a 2012–2013 American comedy panel television show
- "The Burn", a cataclysmic event in season three of Star Trek: Discovery
- "The Burn", a song by Framing Hanley from A Promise to Burn, 2010
- "The Burn", a song by Matchbox Twenty from Mad Season, 2000
