= Armitage (Schriever, Louisiana) =

- U.S. National Register of Historic Places
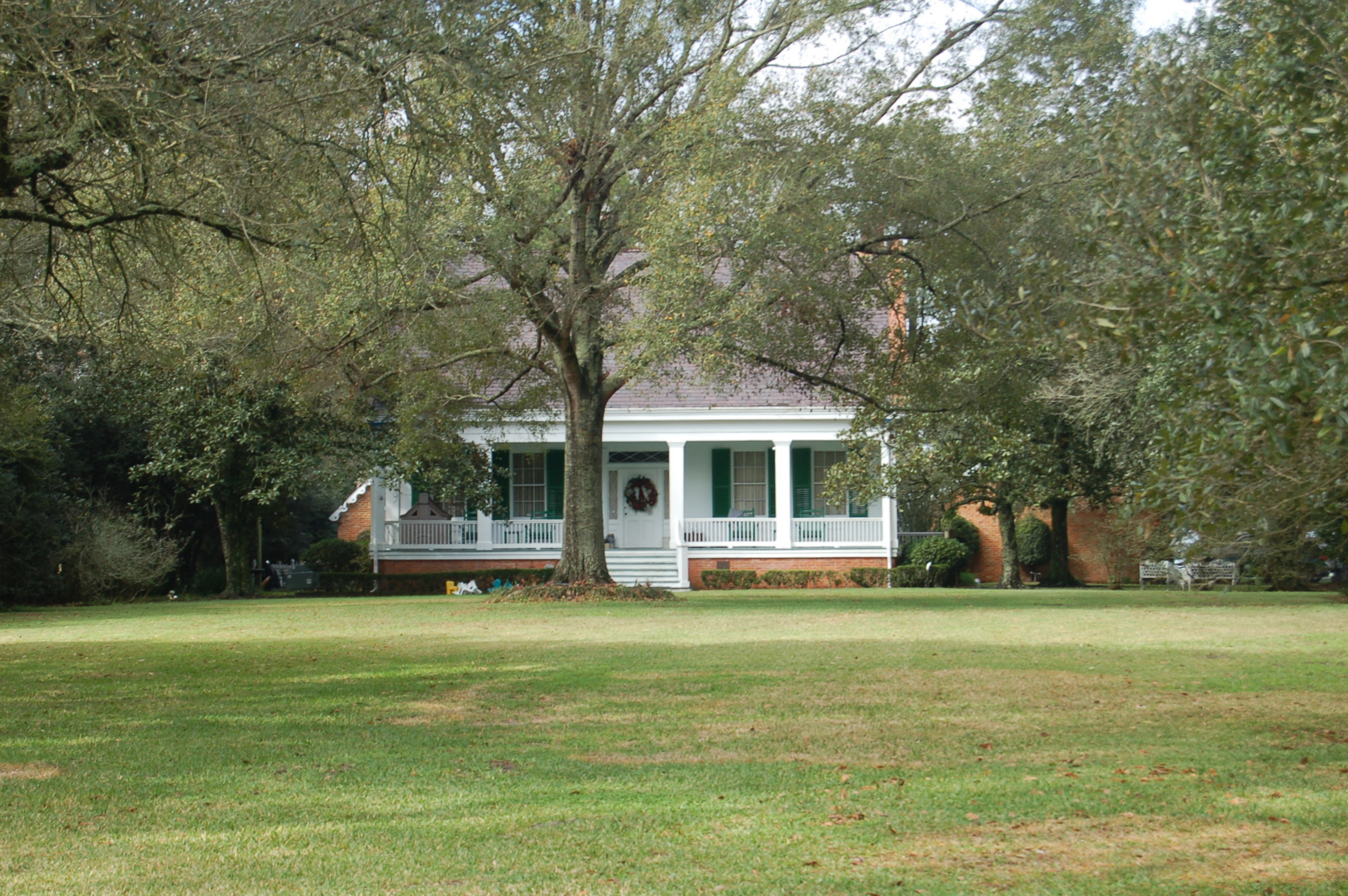

- Location within Louisiana
- Nearest city: Schriever, Louisiana
- Coordinates: 29°45′51″N 90°48′59″W
- Area: 3 acres (1.2 ha)
- Built: 1852; 174 years ago
- Architectural style: Greek Revival
- NRHP reference No.: 84001366
- Added to NRHP: April 12, 1984

Armitage is a historic house on a former plantation in Schriever, Louisiana, U.S.. It was built in 1852 for Francis L. Mead, who lived in the house until 1859, when it was purchased by Charles B. Armitage, his stepson-in-law. It was later acquired by Darden Roundtree, and inherited by his four sons. In 1948, it was purchased by Frank Wurzlow and his wife, and they restored it.

The house was designed in the Greek Revival architectural style. It has been listed on the National Register of Historic Places since April 12, 1984.
