= Clifford Percival Smith House =

- U.S. National Register of Historic Places
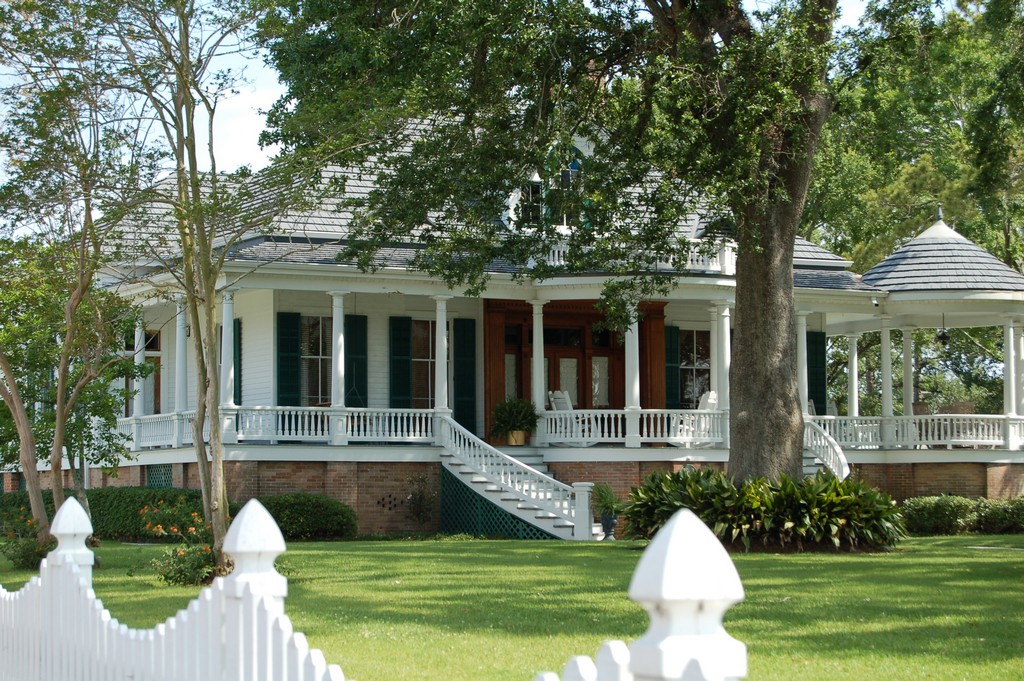

- Location within Louisiana
- Location: 501 East Park Avenue, Houma, Louisiana
- Coordinates: 29°35′59″N 90°43′08″W
- Area: 1.2 acres (0.49 ha)
- Built: 1905
- Architectural style: Colonial Revival, Queen Anne
- NRHP reference No.: 89000327
- Added to NRHP: April 20, 1989

The Clifford Percival Smith House, also known as the Walker House, is a historic house in Houma, Louisiana, U.S.. It was built circa 1905 for Clifford Percival Smith and his wife, Clara. It belonged to the Smith family until 1986. By the late 1980s, it belonged to the Walker family.

The house was designed in the Queen Anne architectural style, with Colonial Revival features. It has been listed on the National Register of Historic Places since April 20, 1989.
