= Lakewood (St. Joseph, Louisiana) =

Historic house in Louisiana, United States

- U.S. National Register of Historic Places
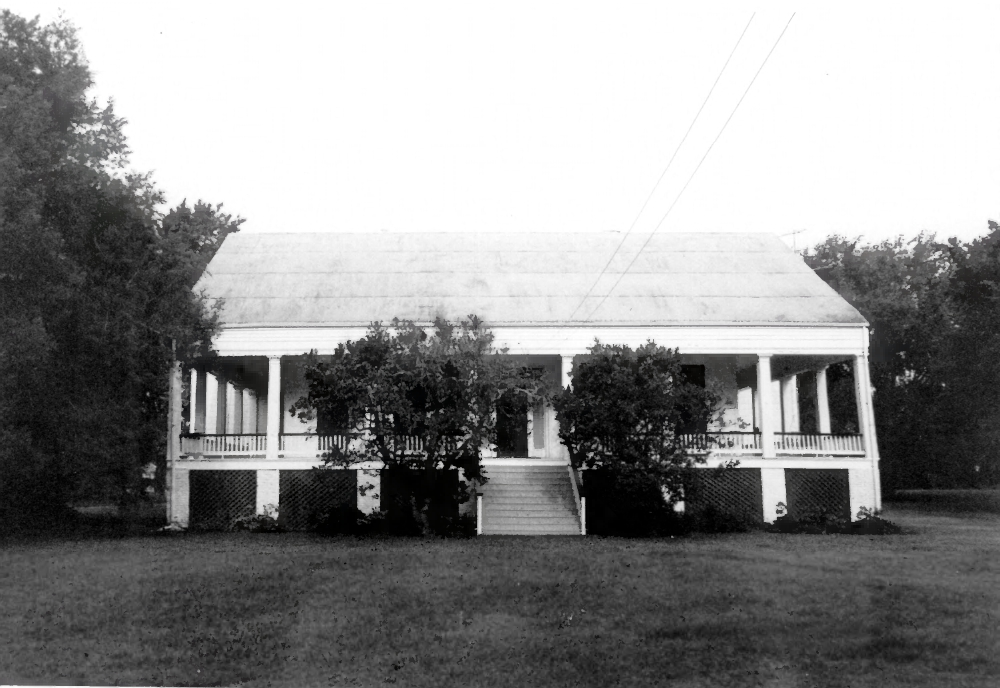

- Location within Louisiana Location within the United States
- Nearest city: St. Joseph, Louisiana
- Coordinates: 31°57′57″N 91°12′30″W
- Area: 0.3 acres (0.12 ha)
- Built: 1854
- Built by: A.C. Watson
- Architectural style: Greek Revival
- NRHP reference No.: 83000547
- Added to NRHP: March 24, 1983

Lakewood is a historic plantation house in St. Joseph, Louisiana, U.S.. It was built in 1854 in the Greek Revival style. It has been listed on the National Register of Historic Places since March 24, 1983. Destroyed by fire, January 21, 2025.
