= Argyle (Houma, Louisiana) =

- U.S. National Register of Historic Places
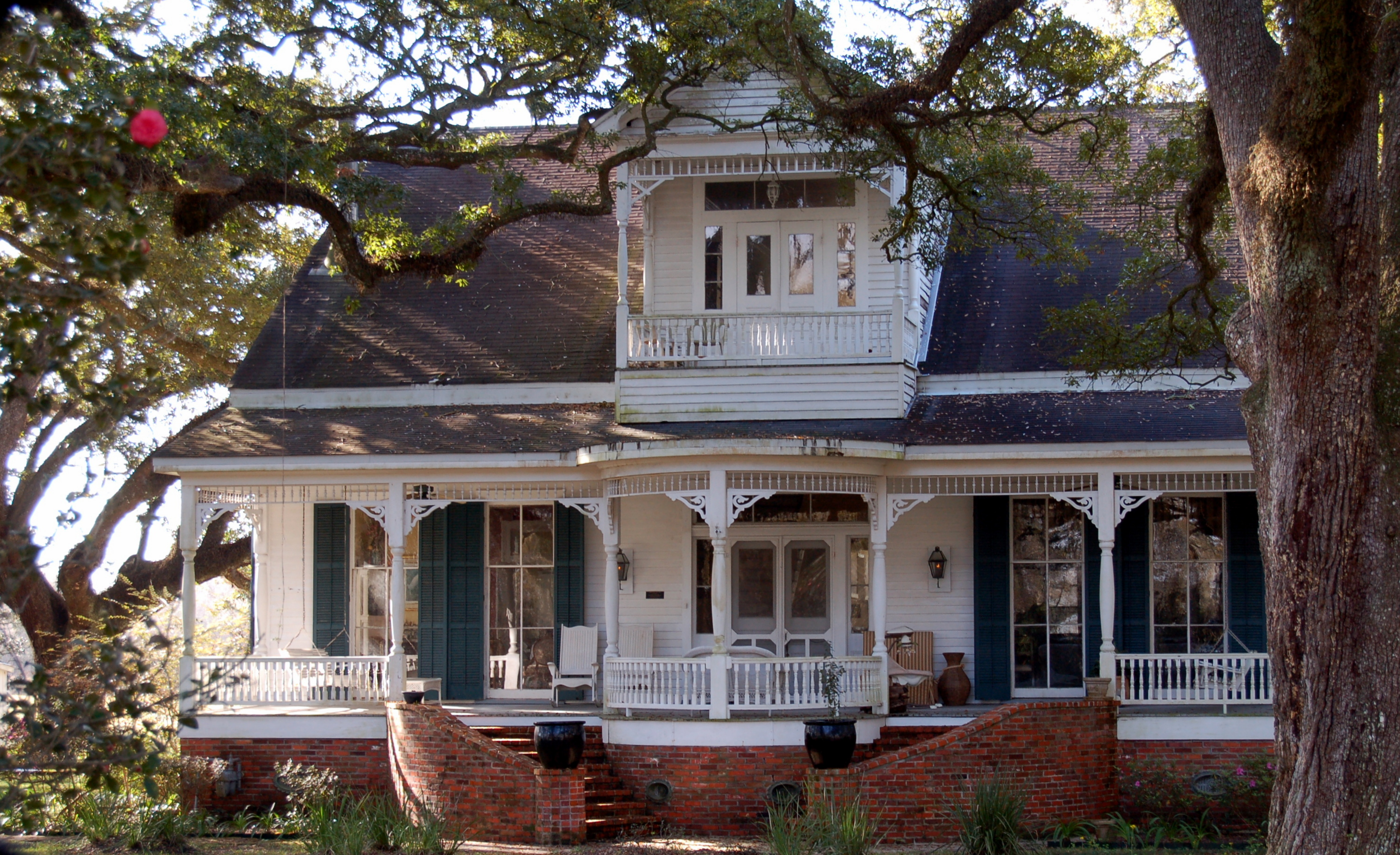

- Location within Louisiana
- Location: 3313 Bayou Black Drive, Houma, Louisiana
- Coordinates: 29°34′22″N 90°45′04″W
- Area: 1 acre (0.40 ha)
- Built: 1906
- Architectural style: Stick/eastlake, Colonial Revival
- NRHP reference No.: 94000657
- Added to NRHP: July 1, 1994

Argyle is a historic house on a former sugarcane plantation in Houma, Louisiana. It was built circa 1906 for Phelin Bonvillain, a sugar planter. It belongs to the Ingram family since 1947.

The house was designed in the Eastlake architectural style, with "a few Colonial Revival features." It has been listed on the National Register of Historic Places since July 1, 1994.
