= Oakland Plantation (Bossier Parish, Louisiana) =

HIstorical plantation house

Coordinates: 32°27′57″N 93°30′52″W

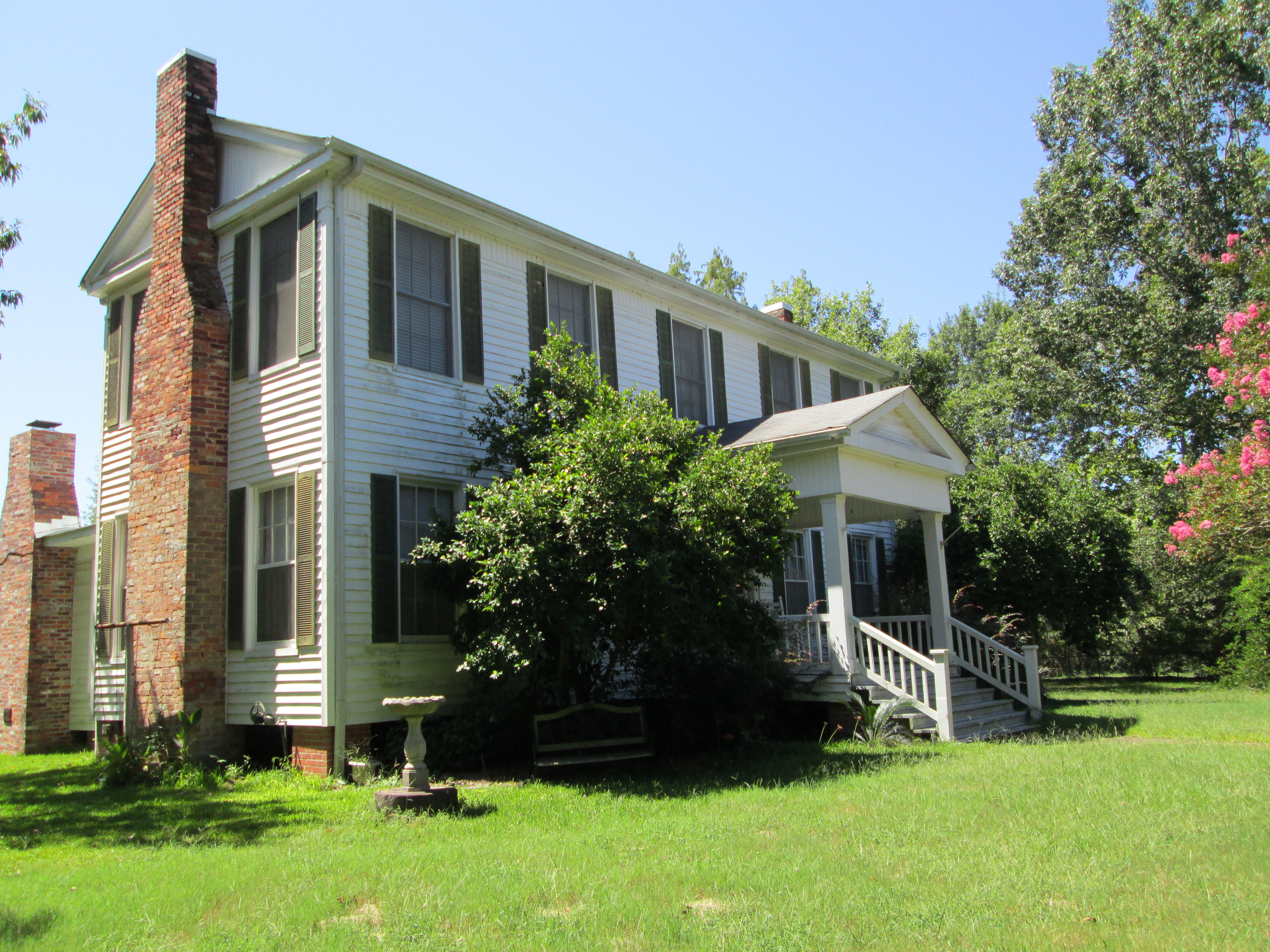
Oakland Plantation House

Oakland Plantation is a plantation house located in Bossier Parish, Louisiana. The plantation and an adjoining cemetery are located on Sligo Road, south of Haughton, Louisiana.

Dr. Abel Skannal purchased the land and built a house on it in the early 1800s. Construction continued from 1838 to the early 1840s. The rear part of the house was modified in the 1960s, the facade of the house has remained the same since it was built.

Doctor Skannal and his family owned five plantations totaling over 8,000 acres (3,200 ha).

Claims of paranormal activity have been reported. Thermostats reportedly would randomly turn down to 0°F, children's blankets would be ripped from the bed, and chairs would rock on the front porch.

== See also ==
- List of plantations in Louisiana
