= Alfred Fairfax =

American politician (c. 1840–1916)

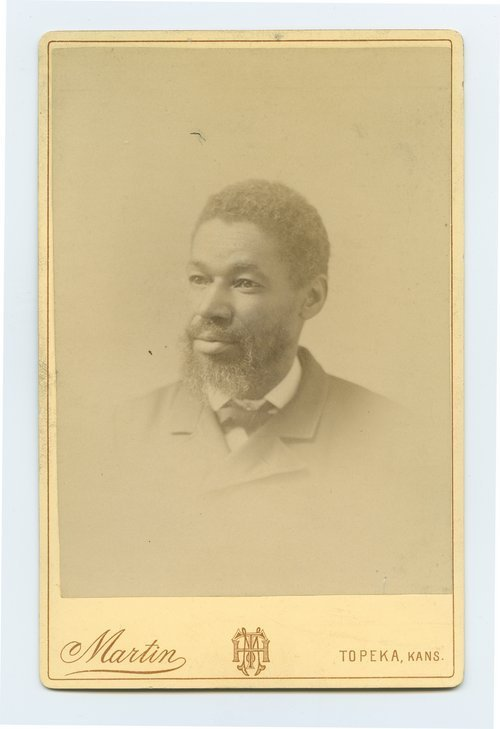

Member of the Kansas House of Representatives
- In office 1888–1889

Personal details
- Born: 1843 Loudoun County, Virginia, US
- Died: March 1, 1916 (aged 72–73) Chautauqua County, Kansas, US
- Party: Republican

Military service
- Allegiance: United States
- Branch/service: US Army
- Battles/wars: Civil War

Alfred B. Fairfax (c. 1840 – March 1, 1916) was an American politician. Fairfax was born enslaved in Loudoun County, Virginia, on the Rockland plantation. According to a profile published in 1889, "At the age of 18 his young master attempted to whip him when be rebelled and attempted to run away. He was caught, brought back and sold to a negro trader named [Joseph] Bruin, who took him to Alexandria, Virginia and from there to New Orleans where he was again sold to Colonel A. E. Bass, owner, of Myrtle Grove plantation in Tensas Parish, Louisiana. He lived on that place till in 1862, when he organized a band of slaves, and confiscating enough mules they fled to the Union Army, then at Grand Gulf, on the Mississippi river. Here the whole party enlisted in the Pioneer corps of the United States army."

He served in the Union Army during the American Civil War. He became active in the Republican Party. He served in the Kansas House of Representatives during the 1888–1889 term, representing Chautauqua County. He was reportedly the first African-American elected to the Kansas legislature.

He owned a cotton farm and was a pastor at the New Hope Baptist Church in Parsons, Kansas. A photograph of Fairfax survives.

== See also ==
- African American officeholders from the end of the Civil War until before 1900
