= Ardoyne Plantation House =

Historic house in Louisiana, United States

- U.S. National Register of Historic Places
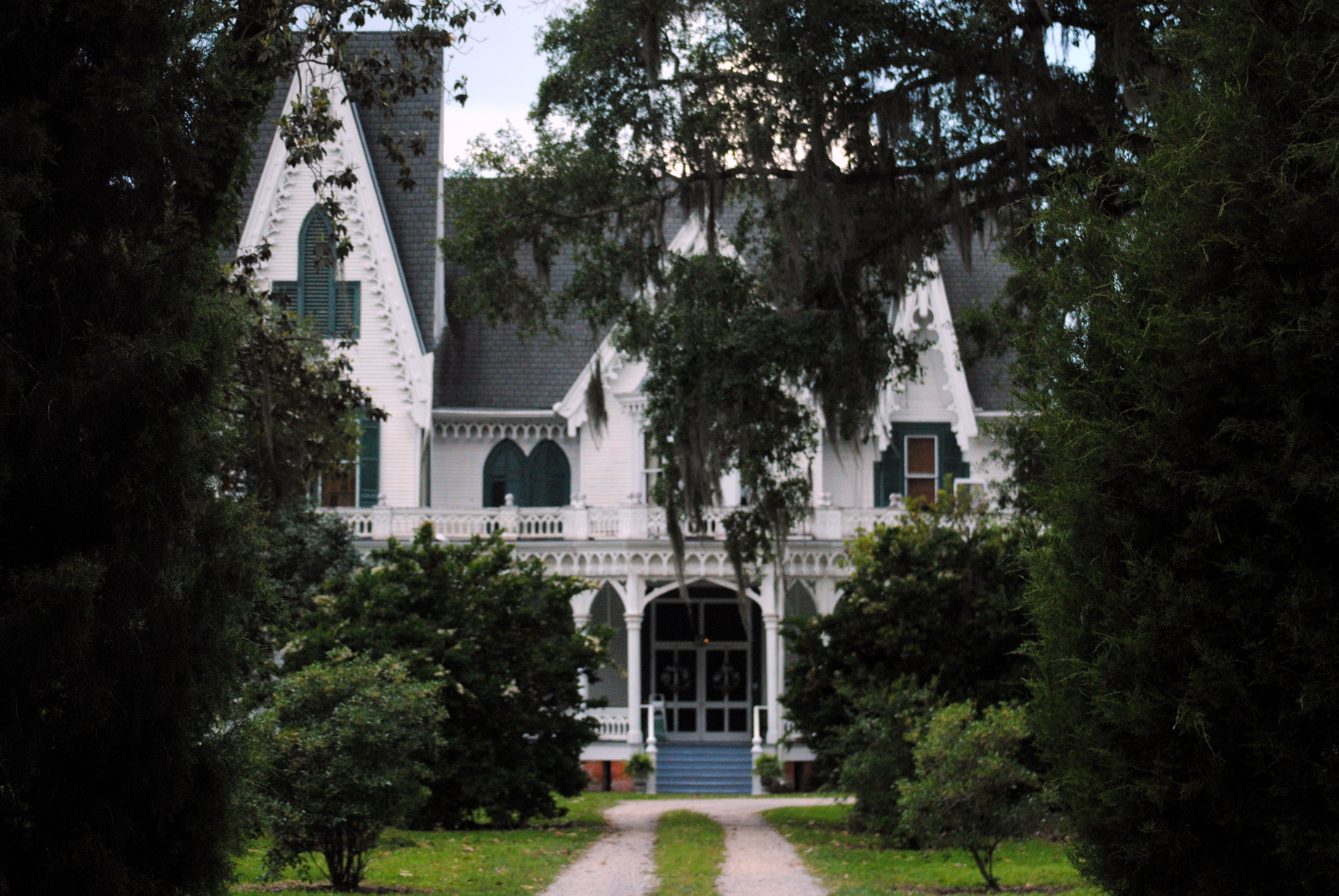

- Location within Louisiana Location within the United States
- Nearest city: Houma, Louisiana
- Coordinates: 29°38′57″N 90°49′10″W
- Area: 8.4 acres (3.4 ha)
- Built: 1894
- Architect: Williams, W. C. & Brothers
- Architectural style: Gothic
- NRHP reference No.: 82000469
- Added to NRHP: November 01, 1982

Ardoyne Plantation House is located on Highway 311 in Schriever, Louisiana, just northwest of Houma, Louisiana. It was built 1894 and added to the National Register of Historic Places on November 1, 1982.

== History ==
Louisiana State Senator, and third generation sugar cane farmer, John Dalton Shaffer was looking for a home for his wife, Julia Richardson Cutliff Shaffer. Mrs. Shaffer requested that her husband build her a little cottage that overlooked Bayou Black. In 1888, he purchased approximately one thousand acres of land in Schriever, Louisiana. He then commissioned New Orleans–based architect, John Williams of Williams and Brothers to design and build the main residence on a twenty-acre tract. The location of the house on the property lead, in part, to the name. “Ardoyne” in Scottish means “little hill or knoll” which was the high point of the property, and the name of a Scottish castle. The construction of the main residence began in 1890 and was completed in 1894. Local immigrants of German, Italian and African descent contributed the labor to build the residence and later would comprise a good portion of the labor force that would work the remaining land. These same immigrant workers harvested the cypress and pine trees from the land that was then sent to a mill in St. Louis, Missouri to become the construction lumber for the house.

== Design ==
Ardoyne Plantation is set in a cluster of live oak trees overlooking Bayou Black. This two-story home stands starkly different than the other homes of this era. Looking at the front, the Gothic Revival architecture design adds elements that capture the attention. There is a seventy-five-foot tower at the left, as seen from the front, and two high gables. The tower is “iced” with fine mill work, commonly referred to as “gingerbread”. This “gingerbread” is continued around the top of the gables. The steep roof line accentuates the tower and gables. The walk through window in the tower contrasts with the bay widow of the left gable. The right gable, much narrower and equally as steep, barely frames the window it protects. The entrance porch is supported by square wooden columns, bannisters and high, walk-in windows. The double entrance door is directly below the center gable of the house, but just a little off-centered to the right side. The boldness of the second story tower, gables and windows overshadow the simple entrance doorway. The woodwork for the house, which was milled from the trees from the property, is present in every room of the house. Floors, walls, ceilings and molding are all native wood. There is a seventy-foot-long hallway that leads to a curving cypress stairwell that leads to the second floor. The plantation office is located on the first floor of the tower and the inlaid wood ceiling mirrors the shape of the octagon structure of the tower. Each room is spacious and lit by chandeliers of crystal and brass. The side porch, which has an Eden-like view of the garden is screened in. In the south, this is commonly called a “mosquito porch”. There was a “coach porch”, which is a porch that was tall enough that a horse driven coach could pass through, that was destroyed by Hurricane Betsy in 1965 and never rebuilt.

== Connection to other plantations ==
The first Shaffer to migrate to Terrebonne Parish was William Alexander Shaffer, John Dalton's grandfather. William came to Louisiana from Camden County, South Carolina in 1828. He moved to Terrebonne Parish and built Crescent Farm Plantation just three miles south of Ardoyne Plantation. Crescent Farm Plantation is still in existence today and house the office of local attorneys St. Martin and Bourque.

After the Civil War, William Alexander's son, John Jackson Shaffer, purchased another sugar cane plantation for himself in 1874, also on Highway 311. Magnolia Plantation was built in 1858 and is only three miles south of Schriever. Magnolia Plantation is one of six surviving Greek Revival style plantation homes in Terrebonne Parish and is currently a private residence. It is located five miles north of Ardoyne and was used as a Union hospital during the Civil War. It is still in the Shaffer family and a portion of the film, 12 Years A Slave was filmed there.

Milhado Lee Shaffer married Margaret Krumbhaar, whom had grown up on the Krumbhaar Plantation, which united the two sugar families. The Krumbhaar family, through Margaret's Grandfather, William J. Minor built the famous Southdown Plantation. This plantation home is also on Highway 311 only a few miles from Downtown Houma, Louisiana, about seven miles from Ardoyne. Today it serves as a museum of local history and gathering place for many outings, music and craft events. Margaret Krumbhaar can also trace her family lineage back to Eleanor Parke Custis Lewis maternal granddaughter of Martha Washington, the wife of President George Washington.

== Ardoyne Plantation House today ==
Ardoyne Plantation has been in the Shaffer family for six generations. It is currently owned by Lee and Susan Shaffer. Lee is a retired military veteran. They currently reside on the second floor of the house. They moved into the house after the passing of Lee's grandmother, Margaret Krumbhaar Shaffer in 2007 at the age of ninety-three. The home is open for tours most every week from Tuesday through Saturday with tours at 9:30 a.m., 11:30 a.m., and 2:00 p.m. with no appointments necessary. Each room is a mini museum of fine furniture, paintings and other family and era specific heirlooms from the family's past. Visitors can see Louisiana cypress knee dolls, 300+ antique travel spoons, plantation workers’ pay tokens, antique quilts and needlework, Newcomb pottery, over two-thousand books, wood carvings, and many other sights original to the plantation. It has also been used as a set location for several motion pictures and television shows. There are also about three hundred and fifty acres of active sugar cane farming still taking place on the property.
