= Frozard Plantation House =

- U.S. National Register of Historic Places
- Location within Louisiana
- Nearest city: Grand Coteau, Louisiana
- Coordinates: 30°24′37″N 91°59′57″W
- Area: 0.6 acres (0.24 ha)
- Built: c.1842
- Built by: Virgil Frozard (original house); Agricole Olivier (1901 addition)
- Architectural style: Greek Revival, Stick/eastlake, Raised Creole cottage
- NRHP reference No.: 82004674
- Added to NRHP: August 12, 1982

The Frozard Plantation House, near Grand Coteau, Louisiana, was built around 1842 and was expanded in 1901. It was listed on the National Register of Historic Places in 1982.

It has also been known as the Olivier Plantation.

It is located about 3 miles (4.8 km) south or east of Grand Coteau off Louisiana Highway 93.
