= The Burn (Waterproof, Louisiana) =

Historic house in Louisiana, United States

- U.S. National Register of Historic Places
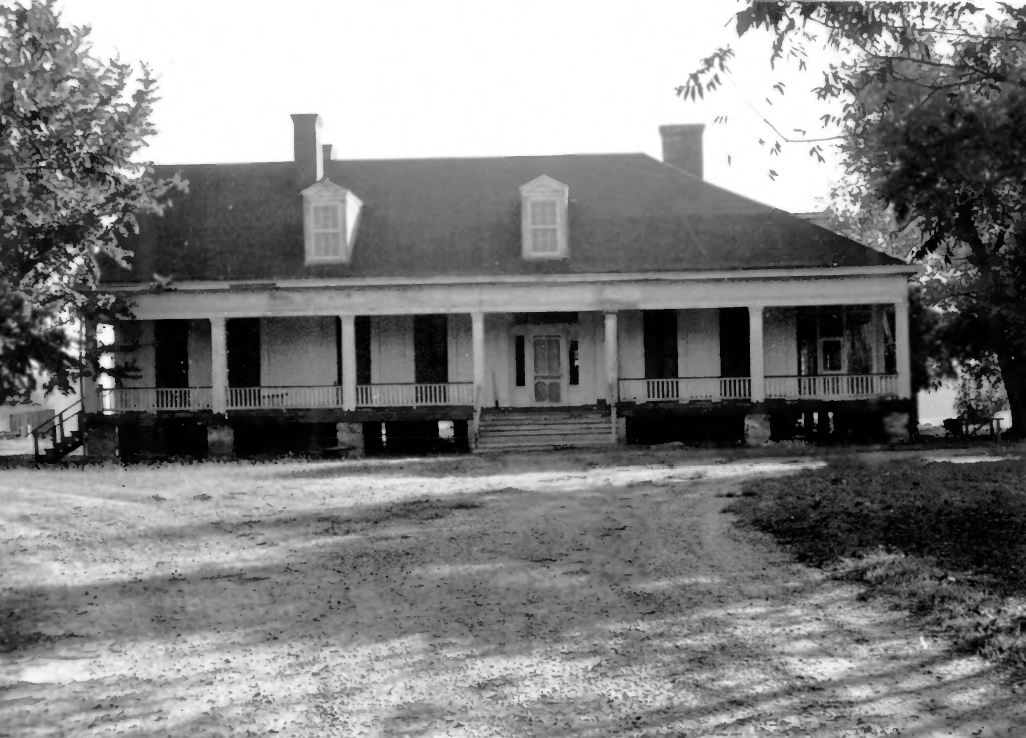

- Location within Louisiana Location within the United States
- Nearest city: Waterproof, Louisiana
- Coordinates: 31°50′26″N 91°23′8″W
- Area: 2.3 acres (0.93 ha)
- Built: 1856
- Architectural style: Greek Revival
- NRHP reference No.: 82002798
- Added to NRHP: August 11, 1982

The Burn is a historic plantation mansion in Waterproof, Louisiana, U.S. It was built in 1856 and designed in the Greek Revival architectural style as part of a forced-labor cotton plantation. It has been listed on the National Register of Historic Places since August 11, 1982.
