= St. George Plantation House =

Historic house in Louisiana, United States

- U.S. National Register of Historic Places
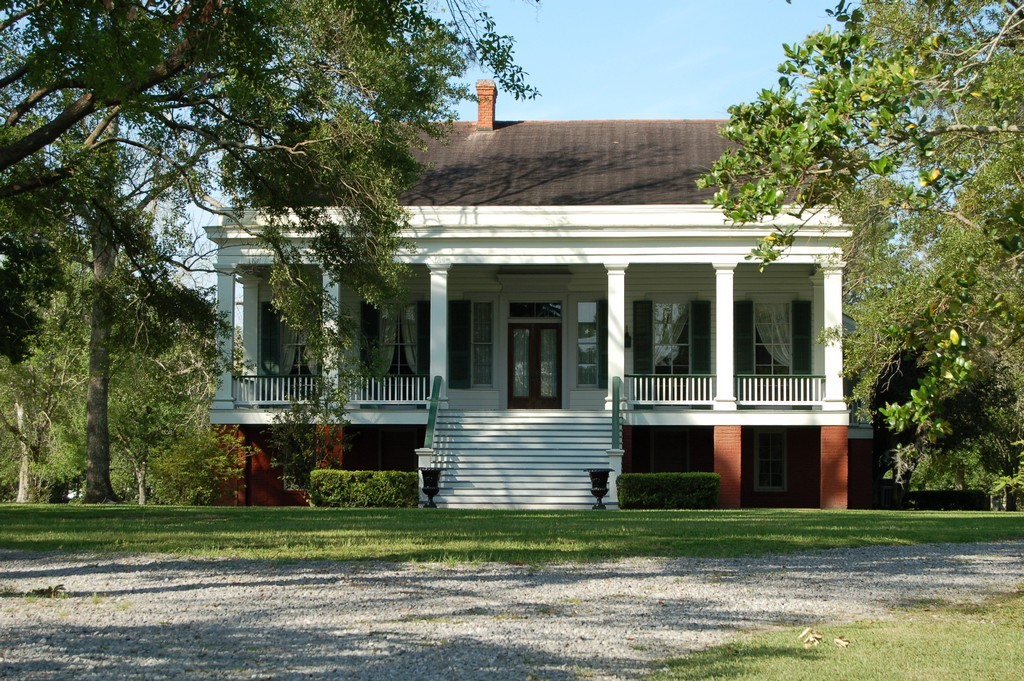

- Location within Louisiana Location within the United States
- Location: LA 24, Schriever, Louisiana
- Coordinates: 29°44′20″N 90°48′28″W
- Area: 0.4 acres (0.16 ha)
- Architectural style: Greek Revival
- NRHP reference No.: 82000470
- Added to NRHP: October 5, 1982

The St. George Plantation House, in Schriever, Louisiana was added to the National Register of Historic Places in 1982.

It is a raised, one-story, frame and weatherboard plantation house reflecting late Greek Revival style. It has "handsomely landscaped grounds" in its semi-rural location in the center of Schriever, in Terrebonne Parish, Louisiana. Its "most prominent architectural feature is its front facade. This composition is dominated by a heroically scaled colonnade of six sixteen-inch square columns rising 13-1/2 feet to support a massive entablature. The fenestration beyond this colonnade is composed of a center pair of large glazed doors with a transom, side lights and a heavy overdoor. The doors are balanced on each side by a pair of double hung windows which open to the floor level giving access from the gallery to the front rooms."

The interior features a grand center hall which is 14 by 56 feet (4.3 m × 17.1 m) in dimension, and has a large fireplace near its center.
