= Inglewood Plantation Historic District =

Historic district in Louisiana, United States

- U.S. National Register of Historic Places
- U.S. Historic district
- Location within Louisiana Location within the United States
- Nearest city: Alexandria, Louisiana
- Coordinates: 31°13′43″N 92°25′12″W
- Area: 98 acres (40 ha)
- Built: 1836
- Architect: Harris, William; Mulhollan, Charles
- Architectural style: Creole Style
- NRHP reference No.: 87002449
- Added to NRHP: January 14, 1988

Inglewood Plantation Historic District is located in Rapides Parish, Louisiana about 6 miles (9.7 km) south Alexandria, Louisiana. It was added to the National Register of Historic Places on January 14, 1988.

In 1988, the rural 98 acres (40 ha) area, along the east bank of Bayou Robert, included two plantation houses and 22 support structures, with all but one intrustion ranging in date of construction from 1836 to 1935. It was surrounded by cotton fields going to the horizon in all directions.

The Inglewood Plantation House was built in 1836 with a symmetrical Creole plan, three rooms wide and two rooms deep, surrounded a gallery on the front and sides. It was renovated and expanded in 1850 with addition of hipped roofed-wings, making for a complex roof.
