= St. Joseph Historic District =

Historic district in Louisiana, United States

- U.S. National Register of Historic Places
- U.S. Historic district
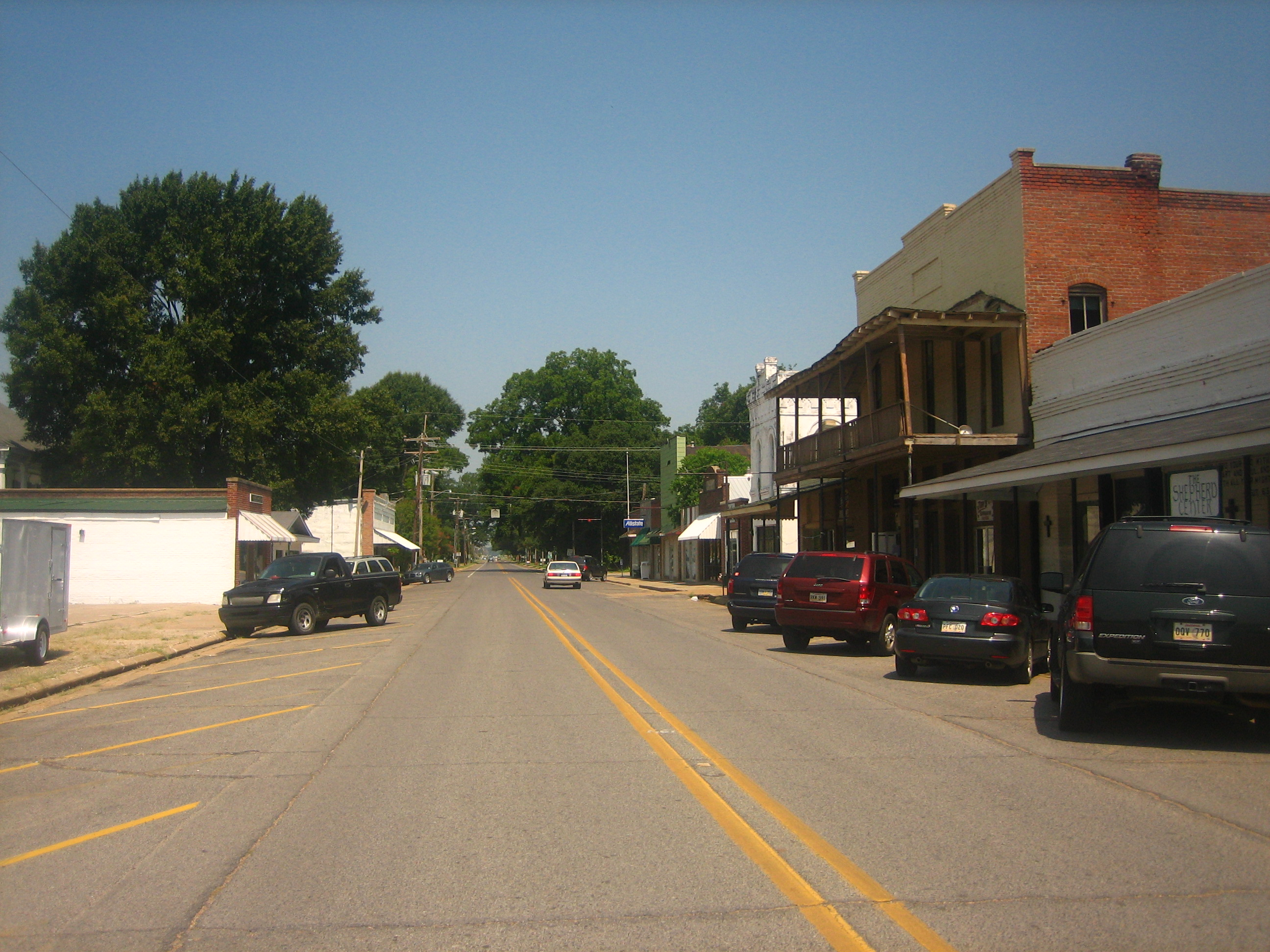

- Location within Louisiana Location within the United States
- Location: Roughly bounded by Panola Ave., Front, Hickory, 4th, and Pauline Sts., St. Joseph, Louisiana
- Coordinates: 31.916111°N 91.236111°W
- Area: 80 acres (32 ha)
- Architectural style: Colonial Revival, Greek Revival, Queen Anne
- NRHP reference No.: 80001763
- Added to NRHP: December 10, 1980

The St. Joseph Historic District in St. Joseph in Tensas Parish, Louisiana was listed on the National Register of Historic Places in 1980. It included 99 buildings, 71 of them being contributing buildings, in an 80 acres (32 ha) area roughly bounded by Panola Ave. and Front, Hickory, 4th, and Pauline Streets in downtown St. Joseph.

The district essentially included the entire town as far as it extended in 1930, with exception of seven lots east of Second Street which had been redeveloped incompatibly in the 1970s, so was excluded.

It includes Colonial Revival, Greek Revival, and Queen Anne architecture. It includes the Tensas Parish Courthouse which was separately listed on the National Register in 1979.
