= Solitude Plantation House =

Historic house in Louisiana, United States

- U.S. National Register of Historic Places
- Location within Louisiana Location within the United States
- Nearest city: St. Francisville, Louisiana
- Coordinates: 30°49′17″N 91°25′26″W
- Area: 1 acre (0.40 ha)
- Built: c.1815
- Architect: Sholar, Levi O.; Smith, Joseph D.
- Architectural style: Greek Revival, Federal
- NRHP reference No.: 83000558
- Added to NRHP: January 27, 1983

The Solitude Plantation House is located in St. Francisville, Louisiana. The plantation house was built around 1815 and was added to the National Register of Historic Places in 1983.

It includes elements of Greek Revival and Federal style.
