= Cottage Plantation =

Historic house in Louisiana, United States

- U.S. National Register of Historic Places
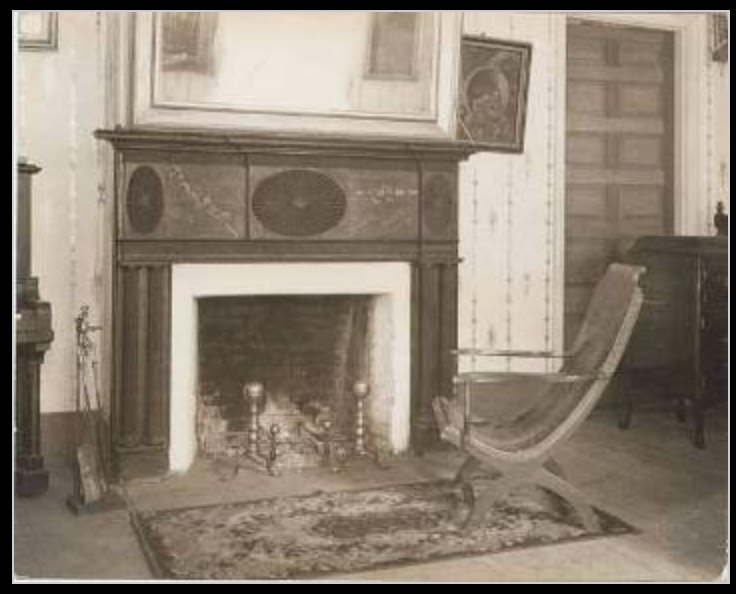
- The interior in 1926

- Location within Louisiana Location within the United States
- Nearest city: St. Francisville, Louisiana
- Area: 519 acres (210 ha)
- Built: 1795
- NRHP reference No.: 75000857
- Added to NRHP: March 17, 1975

The Cottage Plantation is a historic Southern plantation in St. Francisville, Louisiana, USA. The house was built from 1795 to 1859. It has been listed on the National Register of Historic Places since March 17, 1975.
