= Orange Grove Court =

Historic house in California, United States

- U.S. National Register of Historic Places
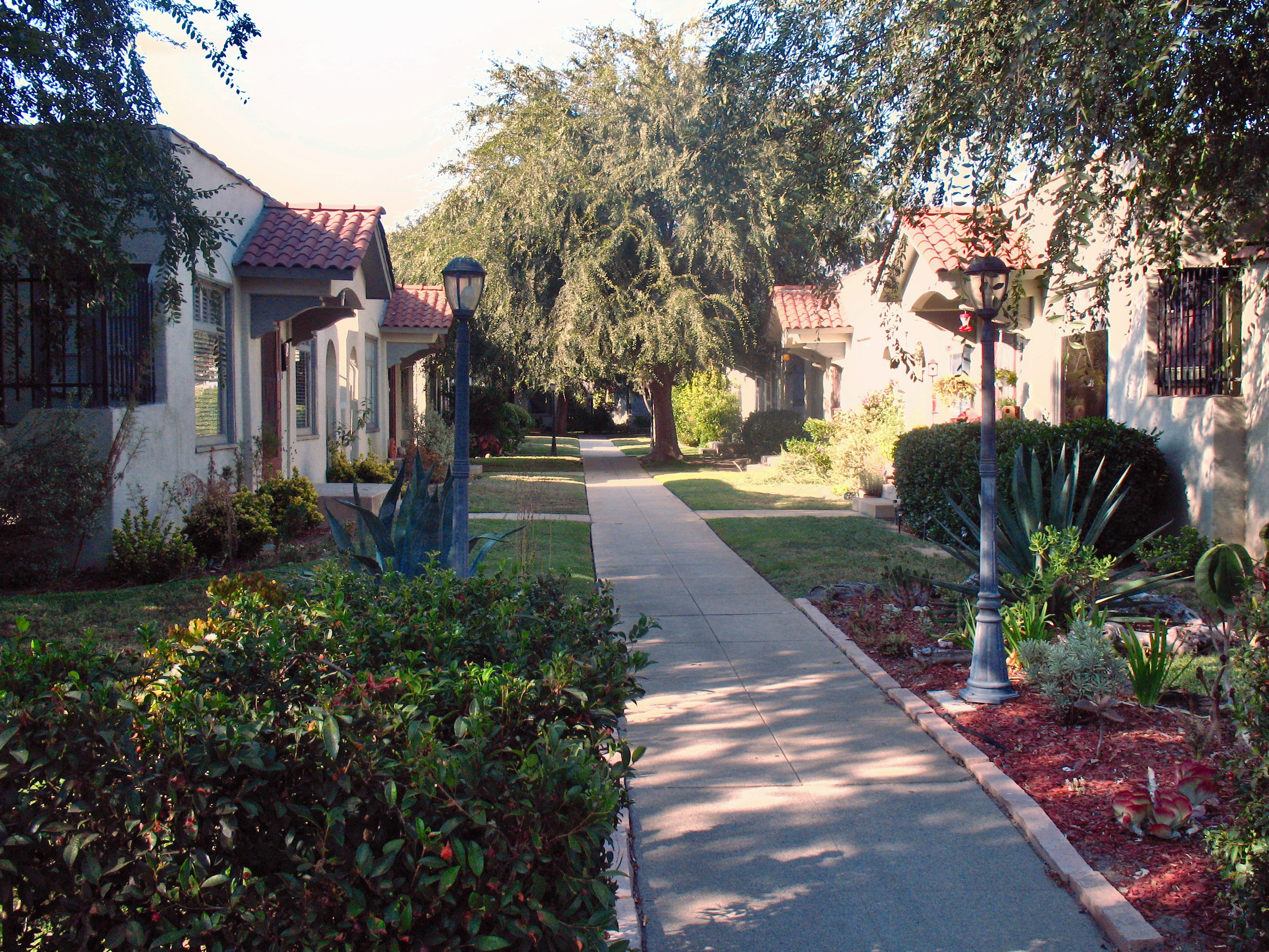

- Location within the Los Angeles metropolitan area Location within California Location within the United States
- Location: 745 E. Orange Grove Blvd., Pasadena, California
- Coordinates: 34°9′28″N 118°8′3″W
- Area: 0.7 acres (0.28 ha)
- Built: 1924
- Architectural style: Mission Revival
- MPS: Bungalow Courts of Pasadena TR
- NRHP reference No.: 83001199
- Added to NRHP: July 11, 1983

Orange Grove Court is a bungalow court located at 745 East Orange Grove Blvd. in Pasadena, California. The court, which was built in 1924, contains twelve single-family houses arranged along a central walkway. The houses were designed in the Mission Revival style and feature arched porches and windows, stucco exteriors, and tile roofs. A double arch is located at the end of the walkway, a variation on the common practice of placing another home at the end of the walkway in a bungalow court. According to its National Register of Historic Places nomination, the court "epitomizes the concept of the Southern California bungalow court" due to its layout and Mission Revival details.
