= Narrows Plantation House =

Historic house in Louisiana, United States

- U.S. National Register of Historic Places
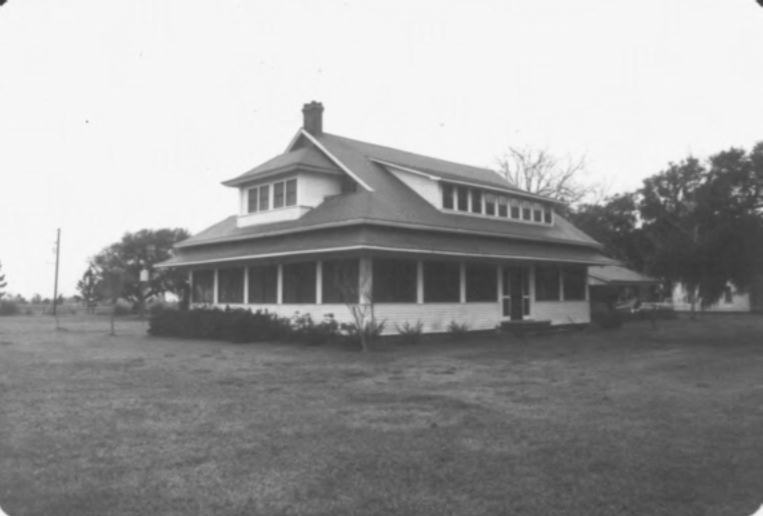

- Location within Louisiana Location within the United States
- Nearest city: Lake Arthur, Louisiana
- Coordinates: 30°03′18″N 92°41′37″W
- Area: 9.9 acres (4.0 ha)
- Built: c.1830, 1910-12
- Architect: MacDonell, John
- NRHP reference No.: 85000976
- Added to NRHP: May 9, 1985

Narrows Plantation House is located in Lake Arthur, Louisiana. It was built in the 1830s and completely renovated during 1910–12. It was added to the National Register of Historic Places in 1985.

Its NRHP nomination states that the building's significance rests in its fine Arts and Crafts interior, which stands out in southern Louisiana:

In a very general sense the thousands upon thousands of bungalows in the region reflect the influence of the Arts and Crafts movement. But these houses are merely pale and diluted examples of the taste. High style, convincing examples of the movement are very rare. Most bungalows in southern Louisiana have plain interiors with perhaps a brick mantel or a few oak cabinets. Many have Mission or Colonial Revival interiors. By contrast, the interiors at the Narrows feature paneled wainscotting, double framed ceilings, balustrade screens, and a very elaborately articulated staircase. These features set the Narrows interiors among the top few examples in the region. Moreover, in one sense the Narrows is superior to them all. None of the comparable examples known to the State Historic Preservation Office have the degree of openness and spatial complexity found at the Narrows. This single aspect places the Narrows in the vanguard of open planning as it was developing in the early twentieth century.
