= Loyd Hall Plantation =

Historic house in Cheneyville, Louisiana, USA

- U.S. National Register of Historic Places
- Location within Louisiana Location within the United States
- Nearest city: Cheneyville, Louisiana
- Coordinates: 31°2′4″N 92°21′18″W
- Area: 2 acres (0.81 ha)
- Built: 1850
- Architectural style: Classical Revival, Georgian
- NRHP reference No.: 77000678
- Added to NRHP: April 29, 1977

Loyd Hall Plantation is located in Cheneyville, Louisiana. It was added to the National Register of Historic Places on April 29, 1977.

Loyd Hall was built around 1820 by William Loyd, who was executed in the house by Union troops in 1864 on suspicion of being a double spy for both the Union and the Confederate States of America. He was tarred and feathered and then hanged in front of his home.

In 1934 the plantation was bought by Mary Raxsdale, whose brother John Clarence Raxsdale Sr. supervised renovation of the Hall. After Mary's death in 1946, the plantation was sold to the Fitzgerald family. Today the plantation consists of a 640-acre working farm and a bed and breakfast.

== Legends ==
The spirit of William Loyd is said to be heard walking around the halls of the mansion he built. A slave, Sally Boston, has been sighted, accompanied by the aroma of food cooking.

A Union Army deserter named Harry is thought to have hid in the attic, where he was fatally shot. He is believed to be buried on the grounds, and the sound of his violin is heard late at night.

William Loyd's niece Inez, who died from falling out of a third-floor window, is said to still play the piano. This was apparently after her would-be husband left her at the altar.
