= Linwood Plantation =

Historic house in Louisiana, United States

- Linwood Plantation Manager's House
- U.S. National Register of Historic Places
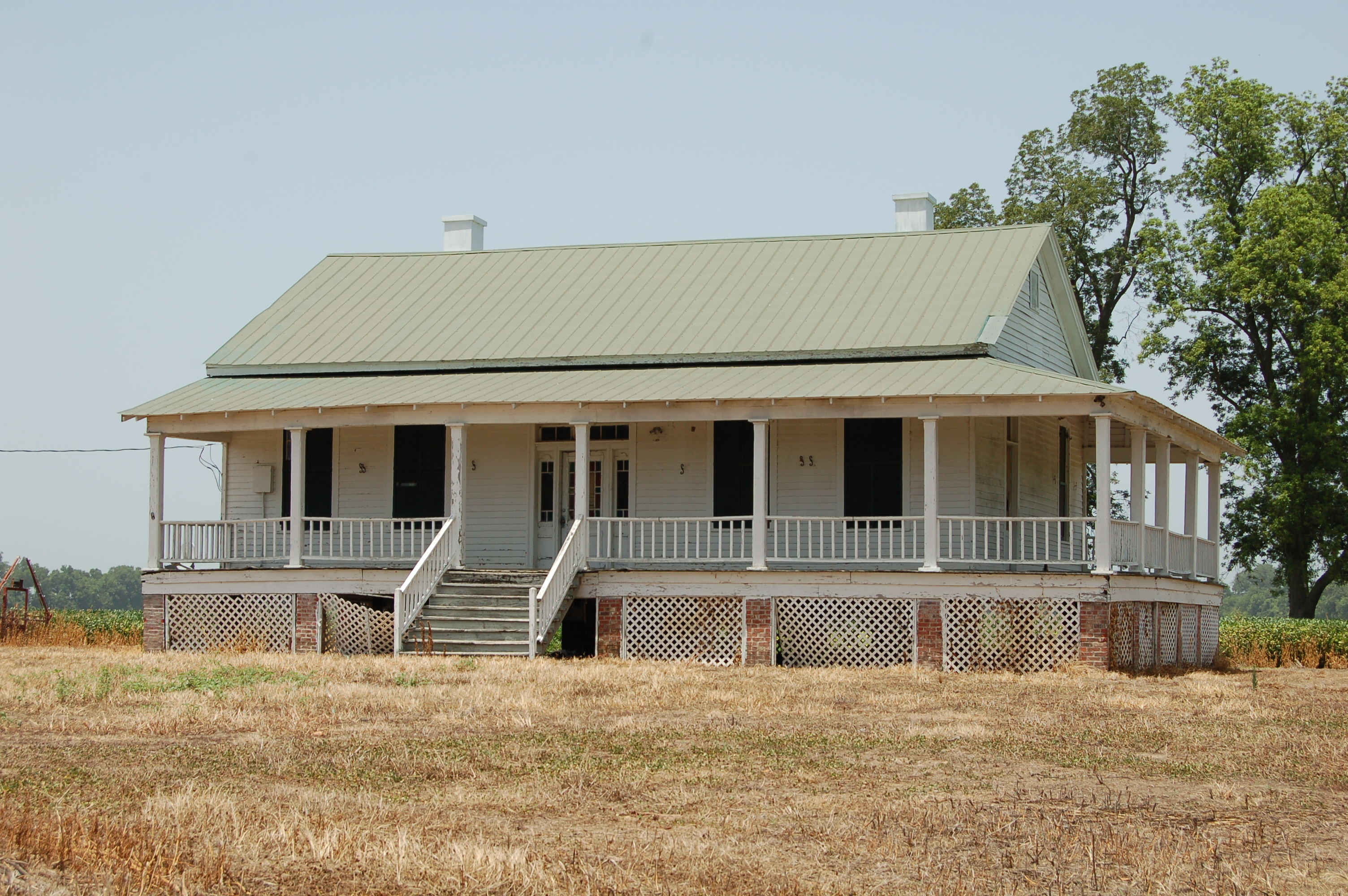

- Location within Louisiana
- Nearest city: Newellton, Louisiana
- Coordinates: 32°1′42″N 91°10′36″W
- Built: 1875
- Architectural style: Greek Revival
- NRHP reference No.: 94000705
- Added to NRHP: September 23, 1994

The Linwood Plantation is a plantation with a historic house in Tensas Parish, Louisiana, United States. The manager's house was built in 1875. It has been listed on the National Register of Historic Places since September 23, 1994.
