= Moro Plantation House =

Historic house in Louisiana, United States

- U.S. National Register of Historic Places
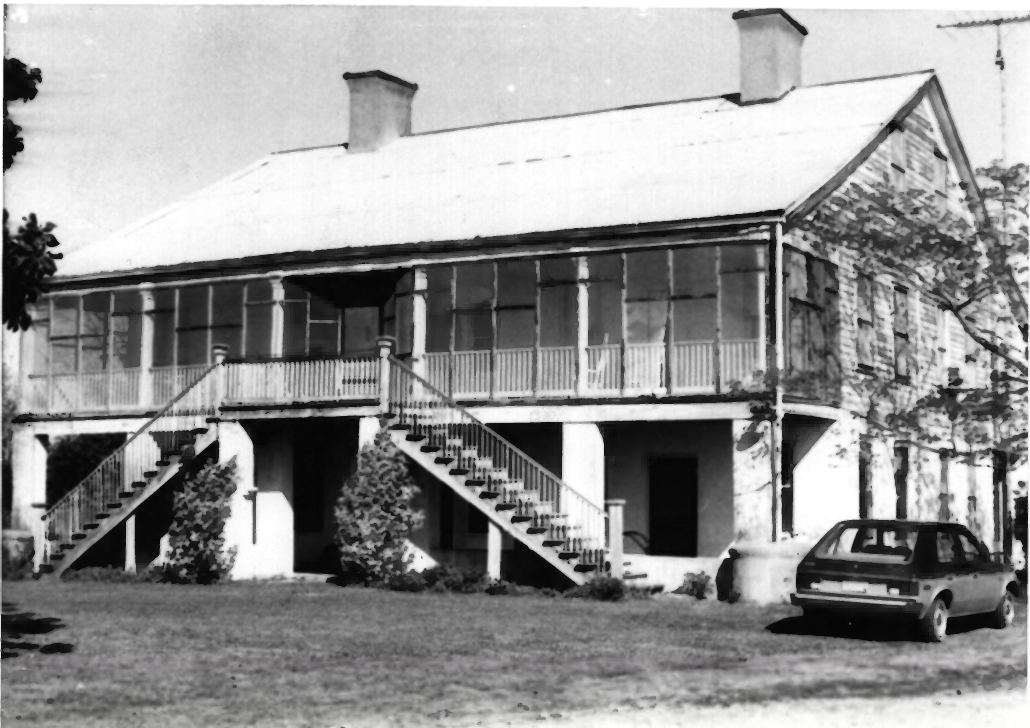

- Location within Louisiana Location within the United States
- Nearest city: Waterproof, Louisiana
- Coordinates: 31°48′54″N 91°25′55″W
- Area: 0.2 acres (0.081 ha)
- Built: c.1839
- Architect: Murchison, Jane; Buck, Theophilus
- Architectural style: Greek Revival
- NRHP reference No.: 82000468
- Added to NRHP: October 5, 1982

Moro Plantation House is located in Tensas Parish, Louisiana. It is just north of Louisiana Highway 566, three miles west of U.S. 65 & three and one half miles west of Waterproof, Louisiana. It was built in about 1839 and was added to the National Register of Historic Places in 1982.

It is a two-story Greek Revival plantation house in delta farmland facing Muddy Bayou near the Mississippi River. It was built as a central hall plan with brick on the ground floor and frame construction on the upper story. It has "outstanding interior woodwork", the finest in the parish, in its four upper story main rooms.
