= Myrtle Grove Plantation =

Historic house in Louisiana, United States

- U.S. National Register of Historic Places
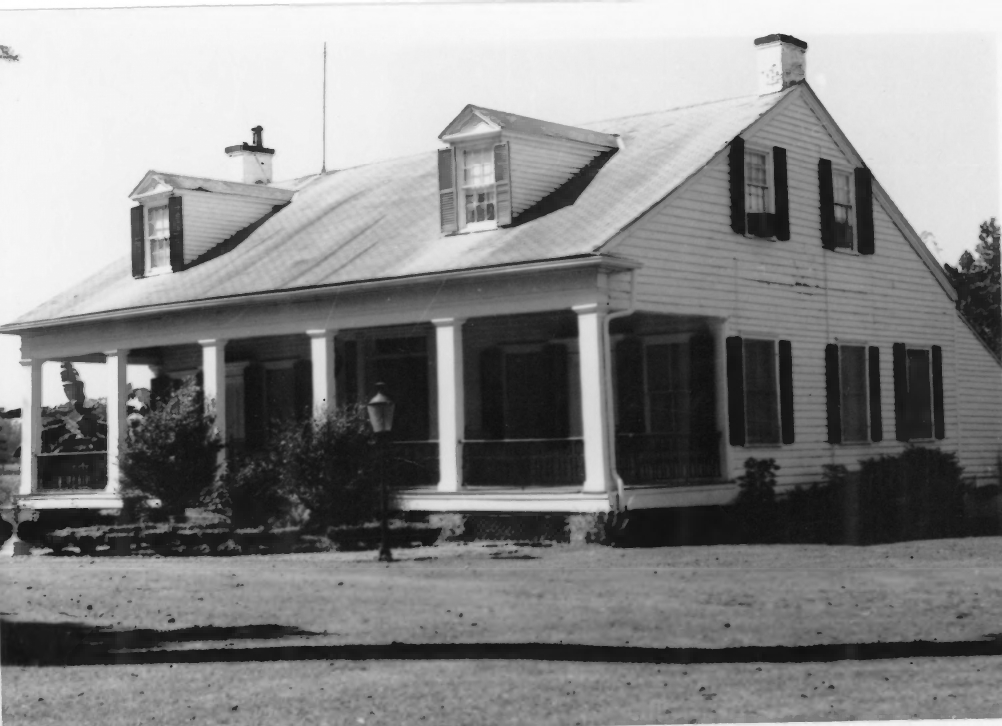

- Location within Louisiana
- Location: Tensas Parish, Louisiana
- Coordinates: 31.81306°N 91.36861°W
- Built: c. 1840
- Architectural style: Greek Revival
- NRHP reference No.: 79001094
- Added to NRHP: May 10, 1979

Myrtle Grove Plantation, also known as the Old Bass Place, is a plantation in Waterproof, Louisiana. It was added to the National Register of Historic Places in 1979.

The antebellum plantation house is located in open, flat farmland about 200 feet behind the rear of the Mississippi River levee; no historic outbuildings survive. It is one and a half stories tall with a "relatively monumental" one-story front gallery having six columns, and it has a rear gallery as well. Greek Revival influence is seen in the gallery columns with their molded capitals, and in the full entablature of the gallery plus a strong entablature of the front doorway with four pilasters.

== See also ==
- Alfred Fairfax – American politician (c. 1840–1916) who was enslaved on the plantation before escaping and joining the Union Army during the American Civil War
