= Magnolia Plantation (Schriever, Louisiana) =

Historic house in Louisiana, United States

- Magnolia
- U.S. National Register of Historic Places
- Location within Louisiana Location within the United States
- Nearest city: Schriever, Louisiana
- Coordinates: 29°42′53″N 90°49′8″W
- Area: 66 acres (27 ha)
- Built: 1855
- Architectural style: Greek Revival
- NRHP reference No.: 83000548
- Added to NRHP: August 4, 1983

Magnolia Plantation, built in 1858, is a private residence located on Louisiana Highway 311, west of New Orleans and 3 miles (5 km) south of Schriever, Louisiana. The plantation was built to cultivate sugarcane, which was a critical part of Terrebonne Parish's antebellum economy. The plantation house is one of six surviving Greek Revival plantation houses in the parish. A portion of the film 12 Years a Slave was filmed at the plantation. On April 15, 2016, a paranormal investigation aired on the Travel Channel on the show Ghost Brothers featuring the Magnolia Plantation.

The plantation was added to the National Register of Historic Places in 1983.
