= Orange Grove Plantation House (Terrebonne Parish, Louisiana) =

- U.S. National Register of Historic Places
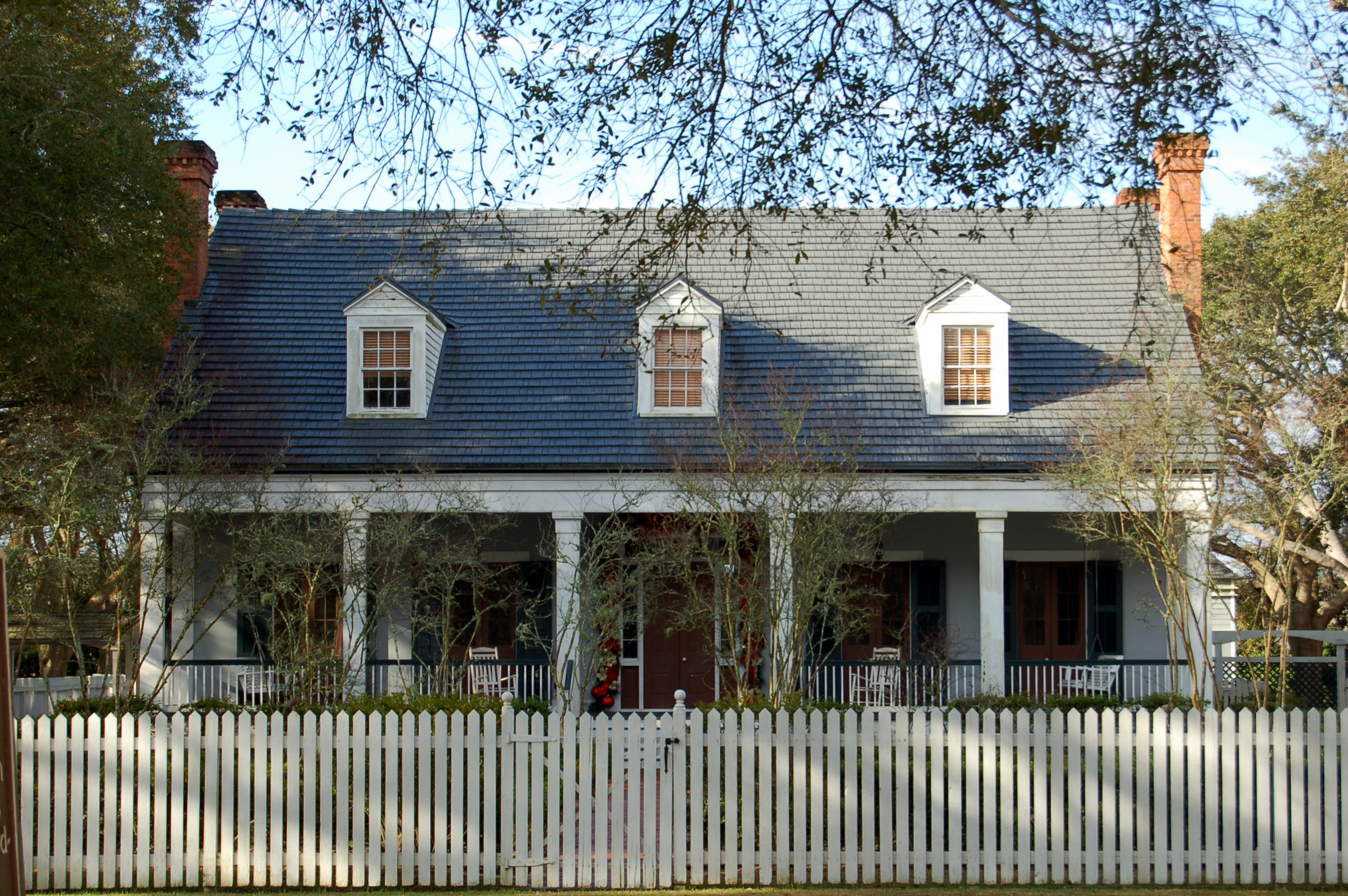

- Location within Louisiana
- Nearest city: Houma, Louisiana
- Coordinates: 29°35′19″N 90°49′23″W
- Area: 4.6 acres (1.9 ha)
- Built: 1850
- Architectural style: Greek Revival
- NRHP reference No.: 80001764
- Added to NRHP: March 26, 1980

The Orange Grove Plantation House is a historic house on a former plantation in Terrebonne Parish, about eight miles away from Houma, Louisiana. It was built in 1850 for John C. Beatty, a sugar planter who owned slaves. The plantation spanned 2,470 acres of land when it was sold at auction shortly after Beatty's death in 1857. Beatty's slaves were sold with the property.

The house was designed in the Greek Revival architectural style. It has been listed on the National Register of Historic Places since March 26, 1980.
