= Schriever, Louisiana =

Schriever
- CDP
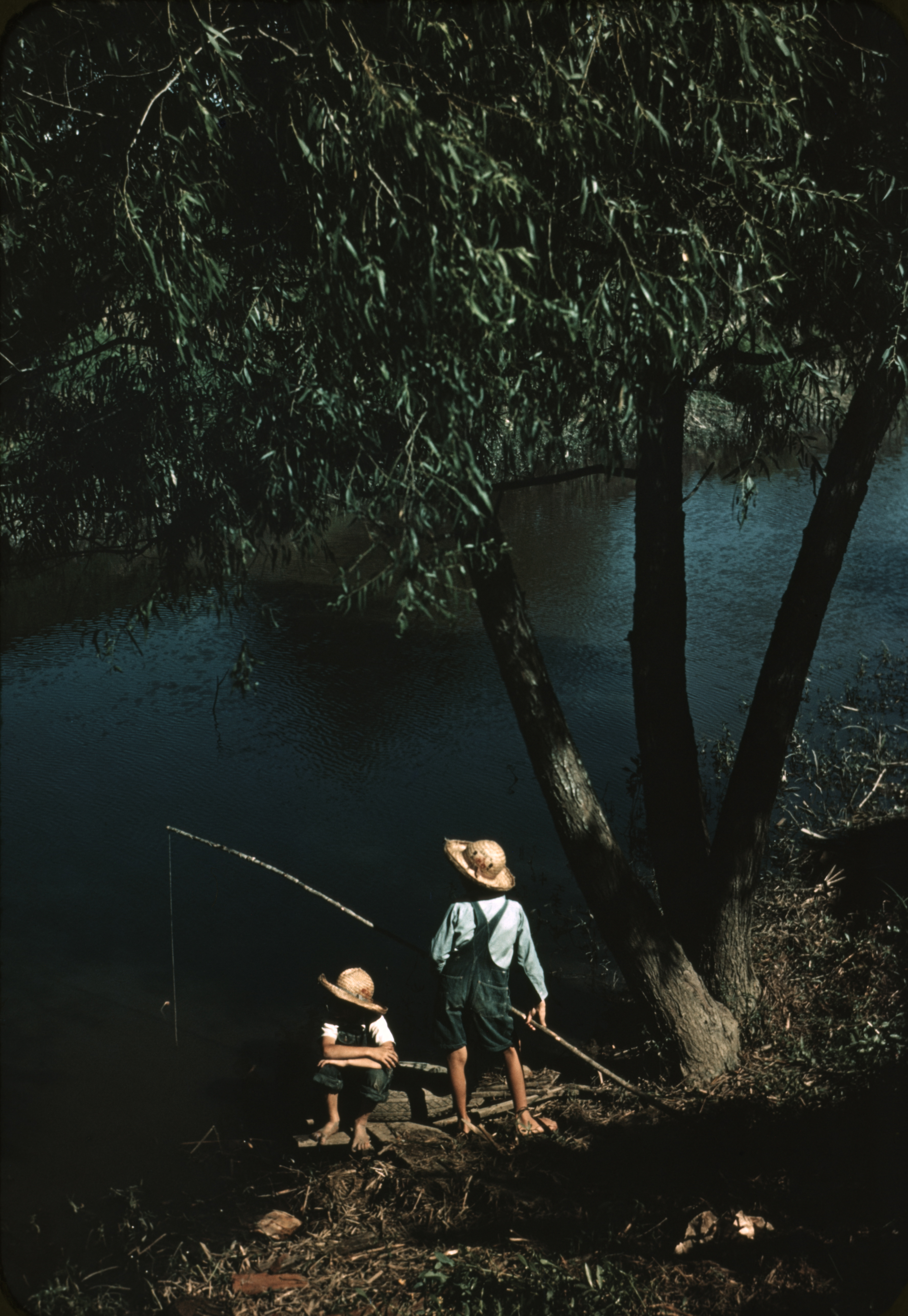
- Children fishing in bayou at Schriever, 1940. Photo by Marion Post Wolcott.

- Location of Schriever in Louisiana
- Coordinates: 29°44′42″N 90°49′04″W
- Country: United States
- State: Louisiana
- Parish: Terrebonne

Area
  - Total: 14.32 sq mi (37.08 km^{2})
  - Land: 14.25 sq mi (36.92 km^{2})
  - Water: 0.062 sq mi (0.16 km^{2})
- Elevation: 13 ft (4.0 m)

Population (2020)
  - Total: 6,711
  - Density: 470/sq mi (182/km^{2})
- Time zone: UTC-6 (CST)
  - Summer (DST): UTC-5 (CDT)
- ZIP Code: 70395
- Area code: 985
- FIPS code: 22-68300

Schriever is a census-designated place (CDP) in Terrebonne Parish, Louisiana, United States. The population was 6,711 in 2020. It is part of the Houma–Bayou Cane–Thibodaux metropolitan statistical area.

The community was named for railroad official John George Schriever (1844–1898) during the 1870s opening of the New Orleans, Opelousas and Great Western Railroad line to Houma.

== Geography ==
According to the United States Census Bureau, the CDP has a total area of 14.4 square miles (37.4 km^{2}), of which 14.4 square miles (37.2 km^{2}) is land and 0.1 square mile (0.2 km^{2}) (0.42%) is water.

Amtrak's Sunset Limited train stops at the Schriever station, serving the nearby cities Houma and Thibodaux.

== Demographics ==
Historical population
| Census | Pop. | Note | %± |
|---|---|---|---|
| 1990 | 4,958 | | — |
| 2000 | 5,880 | | 18.6% |
| 2010 | 6,853 | | 16.5% |
| 2020 | 6,711 | | −2.1% |
U.S. Decennial Census; 1950 1960 1970 1980; 1990 2000 2010

Schriever first appeared as a census designated place the 1990 U.S. census.

Schriever racial composition as of 2020
| Race | Number | Percentage |
|---|---|---|
| White (non-Hispanic) | 4,040 | 60.2% |
| Black or African American (non-Hispanic) | 1,851 | 27.6% |
| Native American | 122 | 1.8% |
| Asian | 39 | 0.6% |
| Other/Mixed | 275 | 4.1% |
| Hispanic or Latino | 384 | 5.7% |

As of the 2020 United States census, there were 6,711 people, 2,584 households, and 1,550 families residing in the CDP.

== Notable people ==
- Sherman A. Bernard (1925–2012), Louisiana insurance commissioner, 1972–88, was born in Schriever.
- Henry S. Thibodaux (in office 1824), former governor of Louisiana, owned a plantation nearby and is buried at Halfway Cemetery in nearby Gray.
