= Lettsworth, Louisiana =

Lettsworth
- Unincorporated community
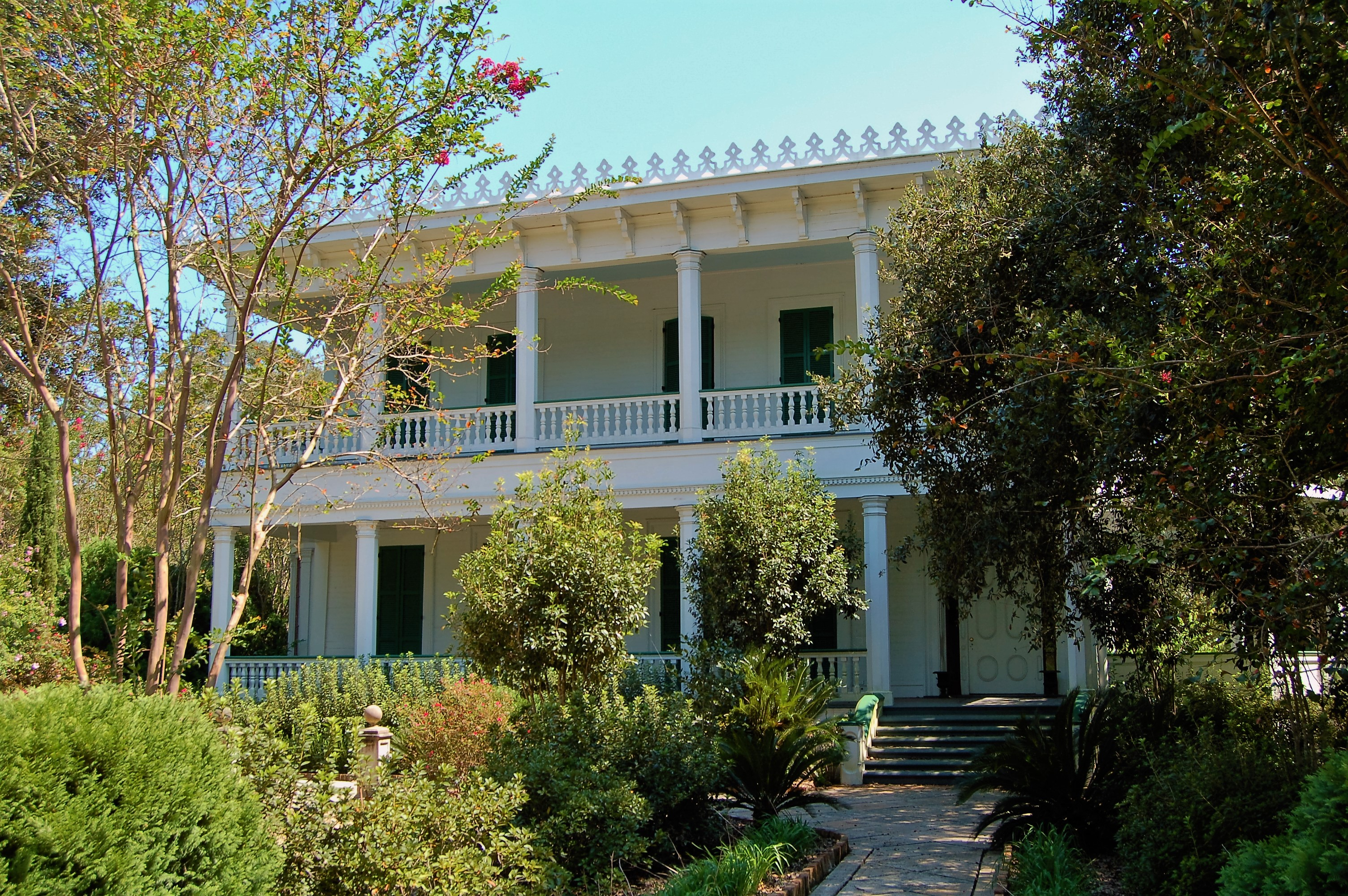
- White Hall Plantation House

- Location of Lettsworth in Louisiana
- Coordinates: 30°56′01″N 91°42′17″W
- Country: United States
- State: Louisiana
- Parish: Pointe Coupee
- Elevation: 39 ft (12 m)

Population (2000)
  - Total: 202
- Time zone: UTC-6 (CST)
  - Summer (DST): UTC-5 (CDT)
- ZIP code: 70753
- Area code: 225
- GNIS feature ID: 555026
- FIPS code: 22-43500

Lettsworth is an unincorporated community located in the northern tip of Pointe Coupee Parish, Louisiana, United States. It lies on the east bank of the Atchafalaya River near its intersection with the Mississippi and Red rivers at the Old River Control Structure. As of 2005, the population is 202. The town's zip code is 70753.

Blues musician Buddy Guy was born in Lettsworth in 1936. The father of journalist Howard K. Smith was originally from Lettsworth.

On the northern end of Lettsworth, bordering the Atchafalaya River, is White Hall Plantation House, an 1840s antebellum structure designed by architect Henry Howard, and once the home of state senator Bennet Barton Simmes (1811–1888), founder of the river town of Simmesport on the opposite bank of the river.
