= Belle Grove =

Belle Grove or Bell Grove may refer to:

== Places ==
=== United States ===
==== Virginia ====
- Belle Grove, Pittsylvania County, Virginia, a 1790s Federal-style home owned by the Whitmell P. Tunstall family
- Belle Grove (Delaplane, Virginia), a 19th-century Federal-style house and farm
- Belle Grove Plantation (Middletown, Virginia), an 18th-century Federal-style plantation house
  - Cedar Creek and Belle Grove National Historical Park, encompassing the above since 2002
- Belle Grove Plantation (Port Conway, Virginia), birthplace of President James Madison

==== Louisiana ====
- Belle Grove Plantation (Iberville Parish, Louisiana), 19th-century plantation house
- Belle Grove (Terrebonne Parish, Louisiana), 19th-century plantation house

==== Other places ====
- Belle Grove Historic District, Fort Smith, Arkansas
- Belle Grove Wildlife Management Area, Maryland
- Bell Grove, Missouri

=== United Kingdom ===
- Belle Grove, London (also Bell Grove or Bellegrove), archaic placename, today part of Welling, in the London Borough of Bexley

== Other uses ==
- Battle of Belle Grove (1864), American Civil War battle in the Virginia counties of Frederick, Shenandoah, and Warren
- USS Belle Grove (LSD-2), a 1943 Ashland-class dock landing ship
