= Old Fort House =

Old Fort House may refer to:

- Harlow Old Fort House, Plymouth, Massachusetts, listed on the NRHP in Massachusetts
- Old Fort House (Columbus, Mississippi), listed on the NRHP in Mississippi
- Old Fort House (Fort Edward, New York), listed on the NRHP in New York
