= Henry Howard (architect) =

American architect

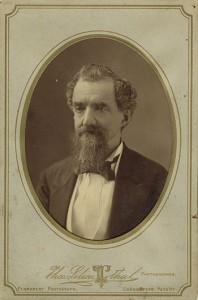
- Born: February 8, 1818; Cork, Ireland
- Died: November 25, 1884 (aged 66); New Orleans, Louisiana, U.S.
- Occupation: Architect
- Spouse: Caroline Richards
- Children: 11
- Military career
- Allegiance: Confederate States of America (1861–1865)
- Branch: Confederate States Navy
- Service years: 1861–1865

Henry Howard (1818–1884) was an Irish-born American architect. Over the course of four decades, he designed over 280 buildings in Louisiana, including several plantation houses during the antebellum era. After the Civil War, he designed many town houses in New Orleans.

== Early life ==
Henry Howard was born on February 8, 1818, in Cork, Ireland. There he learned the architectural trade at his father's architectural office. He emigrated to the United States in 1836, first living in New York City. Within a year, he joined his brother in New Orleans, Louisiana.

== Career ==
Howard first worked as a builder/carpenter in New Orleans, where he built residential stairs. He was employed by architects James H. Dakin and Henry Molhausen. A few years later, he completed the Pontalba Buildings, started by James Gallier.

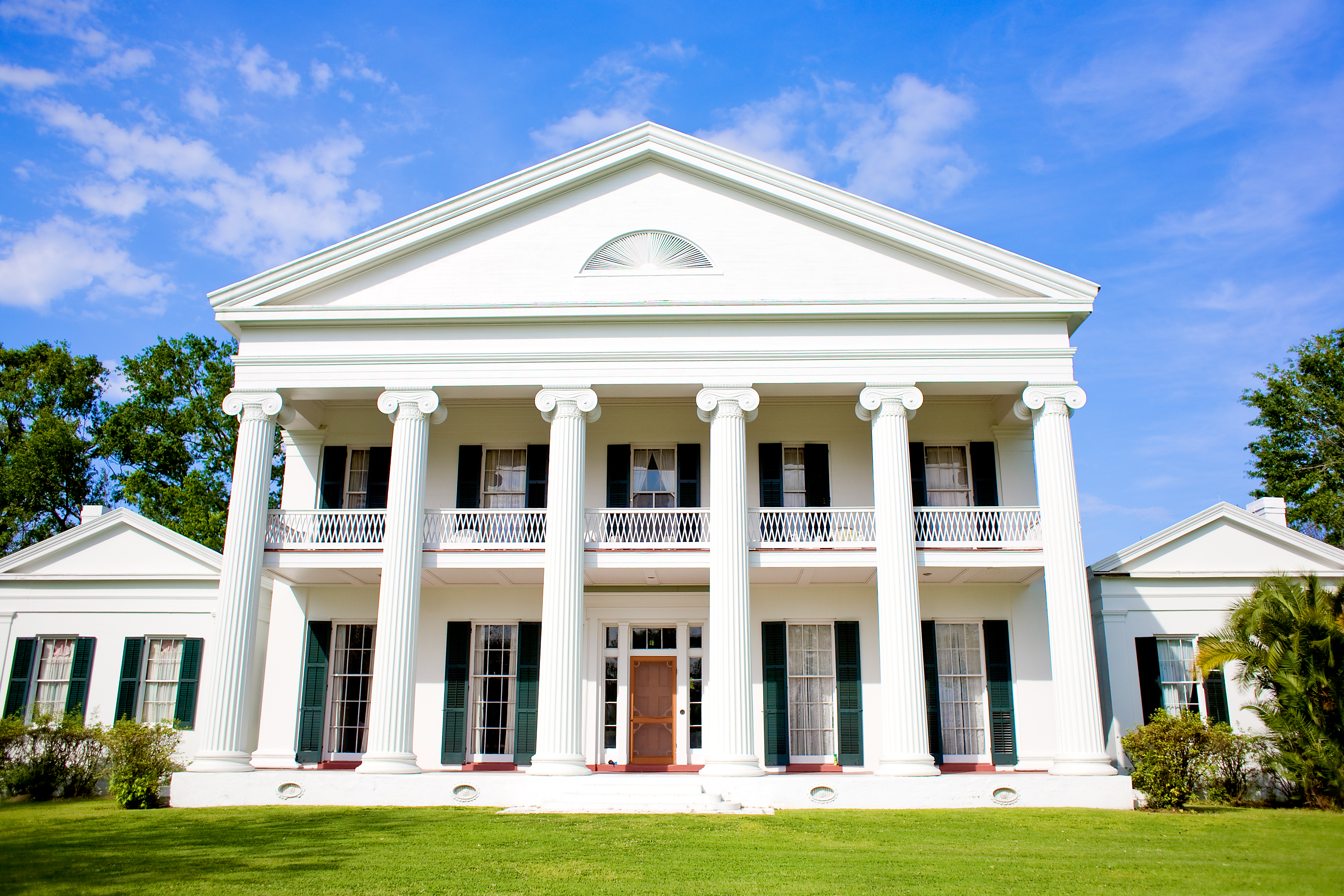
Madewood Plantation House, designed by Howard in 1848.

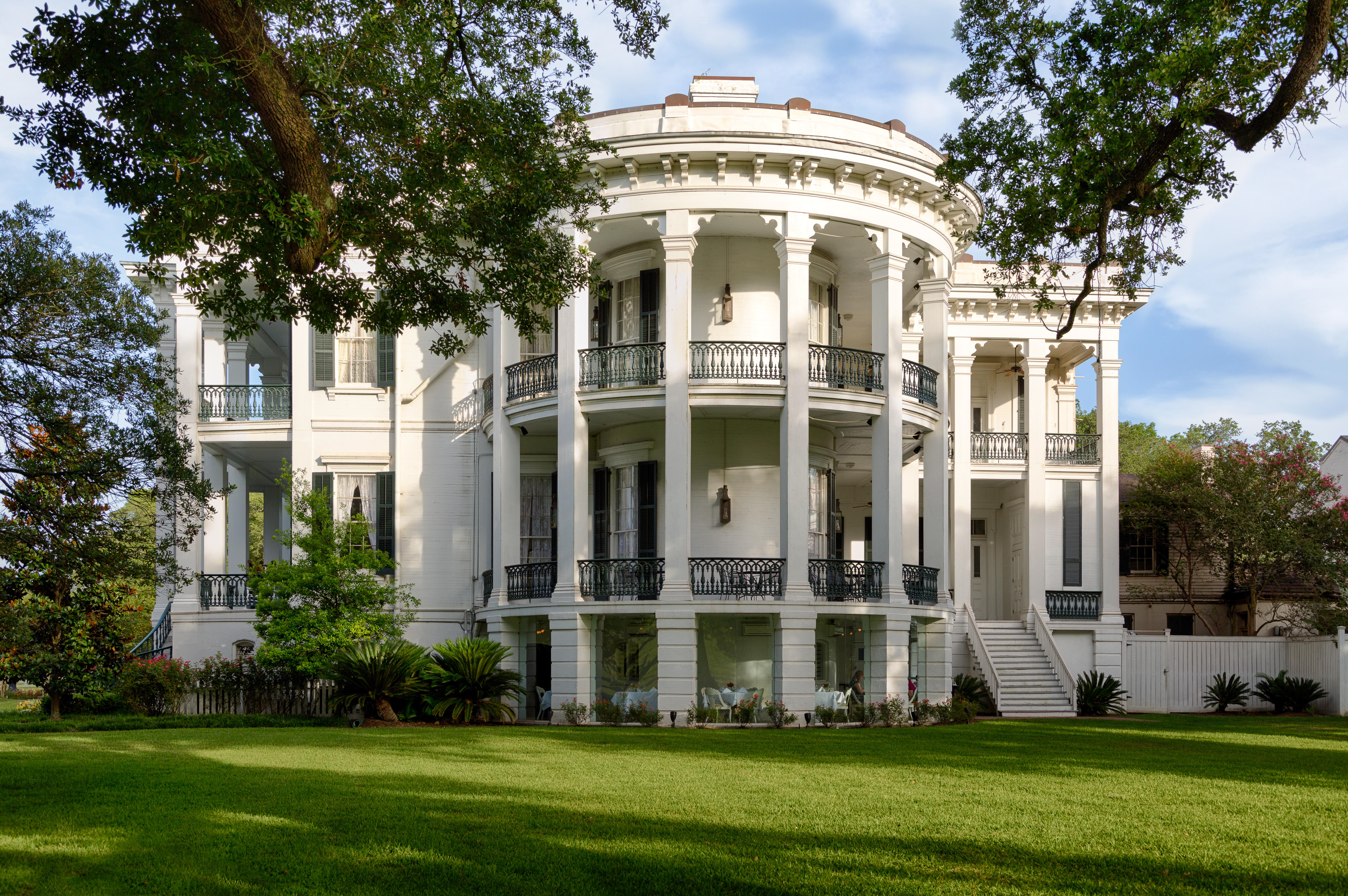
Nottoway Plantation house, completed by Howard in 1859.

By 1848, he designed the Madewood Plantation House near Napoleonville. He went on to design several other plantation mansions, such as Nottoway (1859, which was largest surviving plantation house in the South prior to a fire May 15, 2025 which destroyed much of the main house), Belle Alliance, Indian Camp Plantation (1859), Belmont Plantation in St. James Parish, and Edgewood (1859) in Natchez, Mississippi .

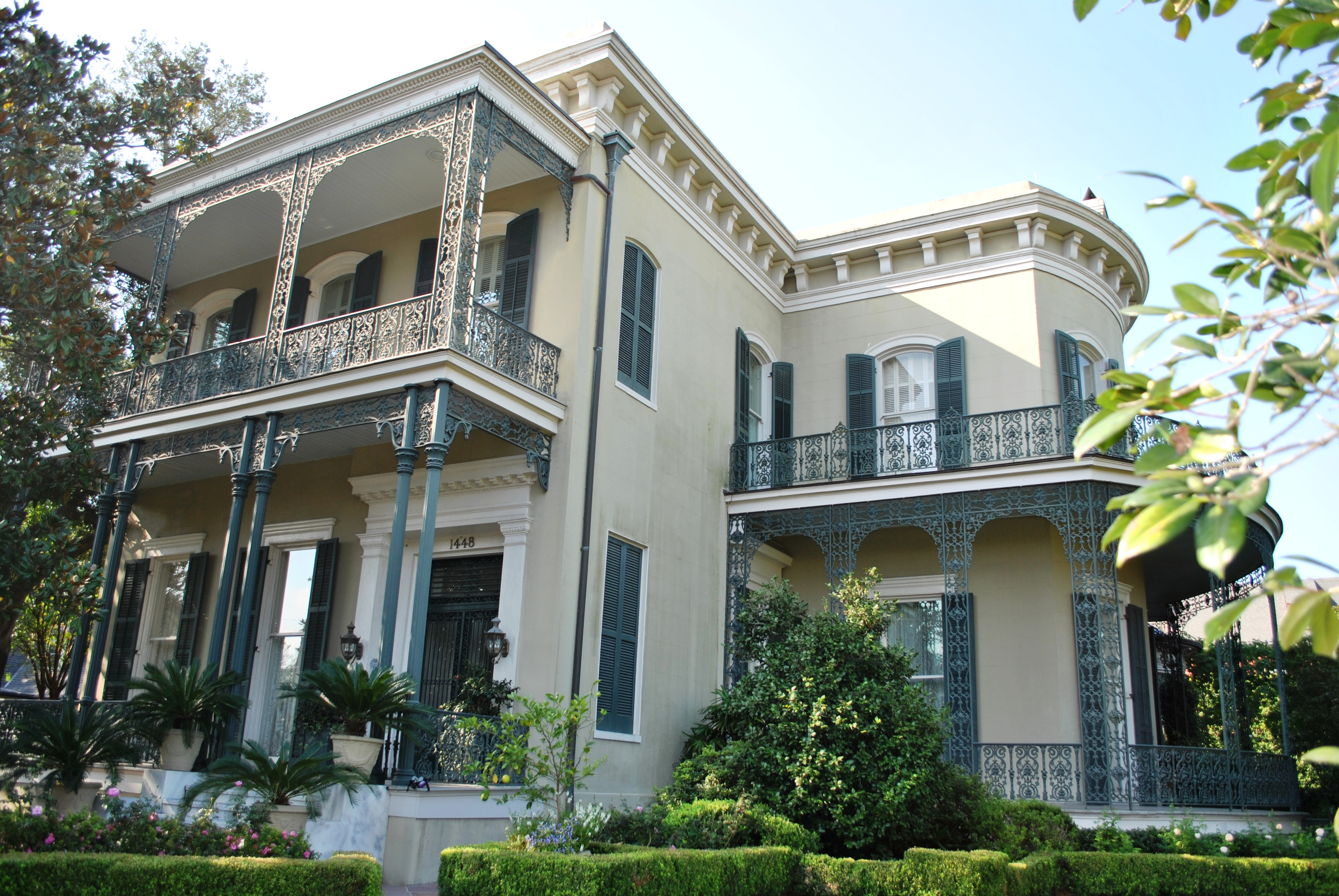
Robert H. Short House

Howard also designed town houses like the Samuel W. Logan House, the Robert H. Short House and the Goldsmith-Godchaux House (1859). The Goldsmith-Godchaux House is "significant for its painted interiors. Has more fresco wall decoration and stenciling than probably any other mid-nineteenth century residence in the South."

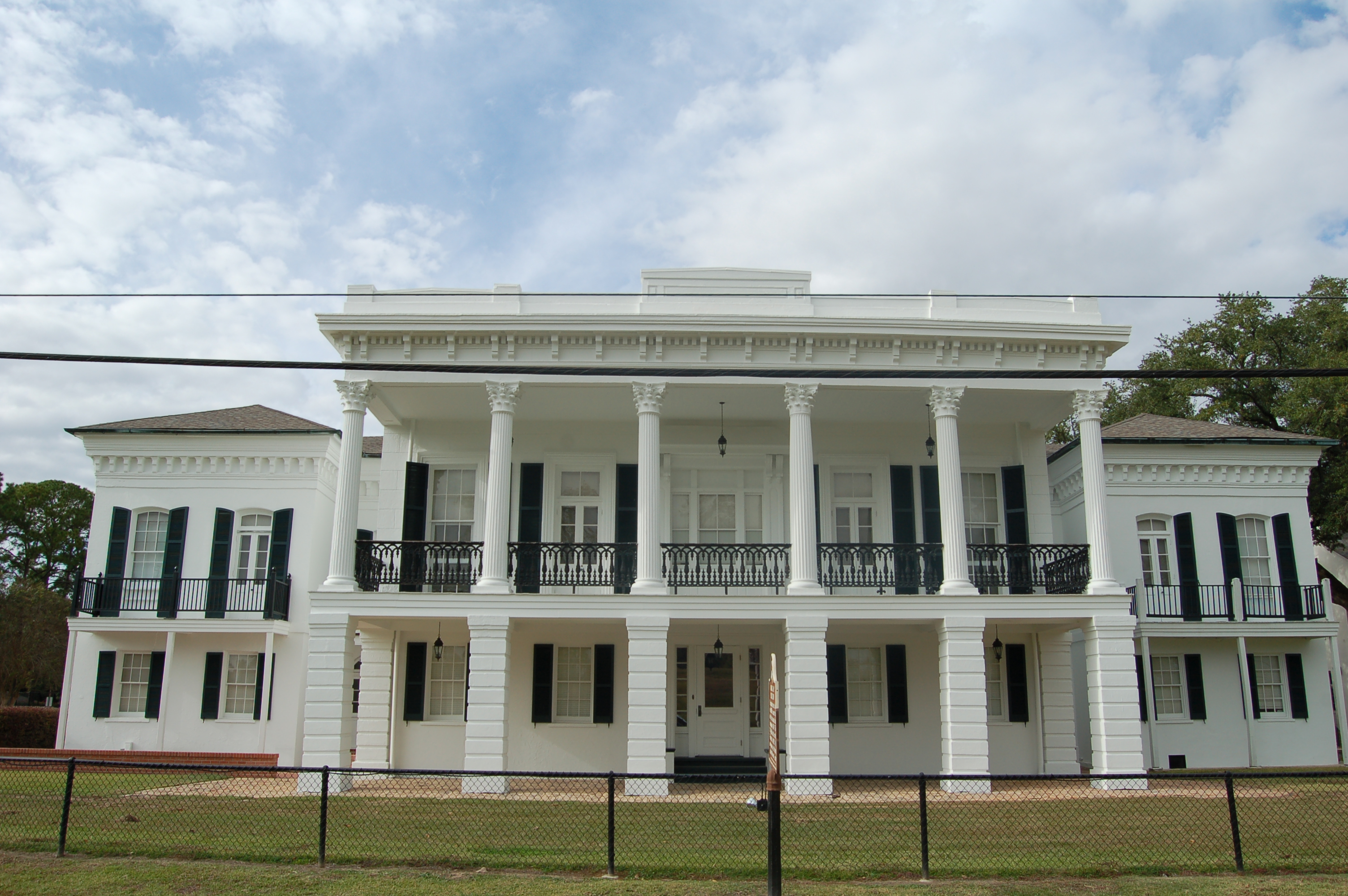
Indian Camp Plantation House, designed in 1859.

In at least a few of these projects, Howard worked with a partner, Albert Diettel, including Edgewood and possibly Indian Camp Plantation.

During the American Civil War of 1861-1865, Howard joined the Confederate States Navy and worked at the Confederate Naval Iron Works in Columbus, Georgia.

After the war, Howard resumed designing houses. Over the course of his career, he designed over 280 buildings, some of which were wrongly attributed to James Gallier.

== Other works ==
- Belle Grove Plantation, Iberville Parish, Louisiana
- Carrollton Courthouse, New Orleans
- White Hall Plantation House, Pointe Coupee Parish

== Personal life and death ==
Howard married Caroline Richards of New York; they had 11 children. He died of paralysis on November 25, 1884, in New Orleans.
