= White Hall Plantation House =

Historic house in Louisiana, United States

- U.S. National Register of Historic Places
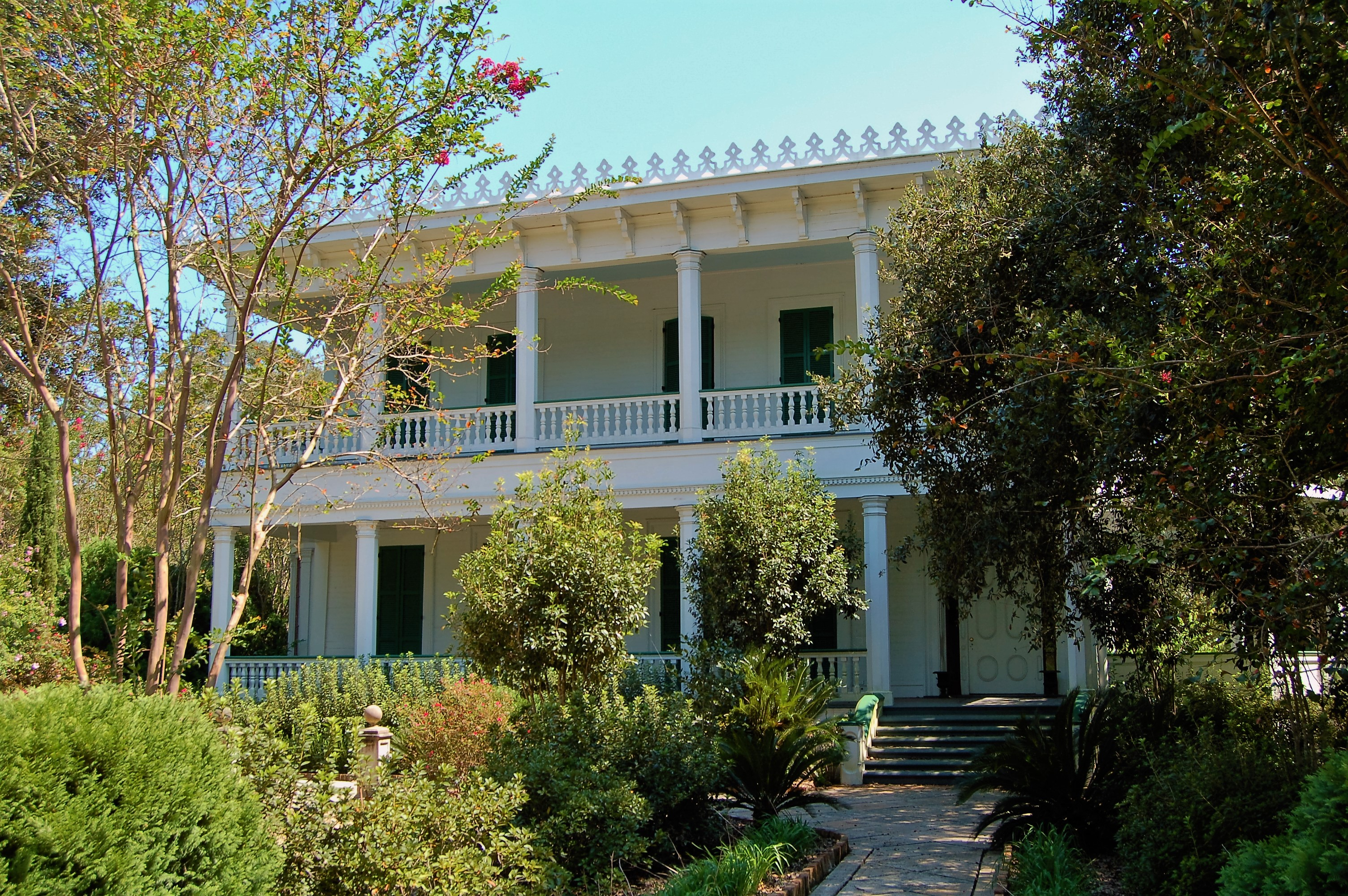

- Location within Louisiana Location within the United States
- Nearest city: Lettsworth, Louisiana, U.S.
- Coordinates: 30°58′59″N 91°46′42″W
- Built: 1849
- Architectural style: Greek Revival, Italianate
- NRHP reference No.: 77000677
- Added to NRHP: May 26, 1977

White Hall Plantation House is an 1840s Italianate and Greek Revival plantation house attributed to the architect Henry Howard and built in 1848-49 by Elias Norwood. It is located in Legonier, a hamlet on the east bank of the Atchafalaya River, today part of the unincorporated town of Lettsworth, Louisiana. White Hall's most notable owner and slaveholder was Bennet Barton Simmes, founder of Simmesport, state senator, and contributor to the Louisiana Articles of Secession prior to the Civil War. He is also said to have been a steamboat captain and Confederate general. The home is listed on the National Register of Historic Places.

Union General Nathaniel P. Banks used the house as a military headquarters in 1863. During the 20th century, the mansion was twice moved back from the encroaching river waters. In late 2013, after a decade of restoration work, the White Hall Plantation & Gardens were opened to public view for the first time.

== See also ==
- List of plantations in Louisiana
- National Register of Historic Places listings in Pointe Coupee Parish, Louisiana
