= Nottoway Plantation =

Historic plantation in Louisiana, United States

- Nottoway Plantation House
- U.S. National Register of Historic Places
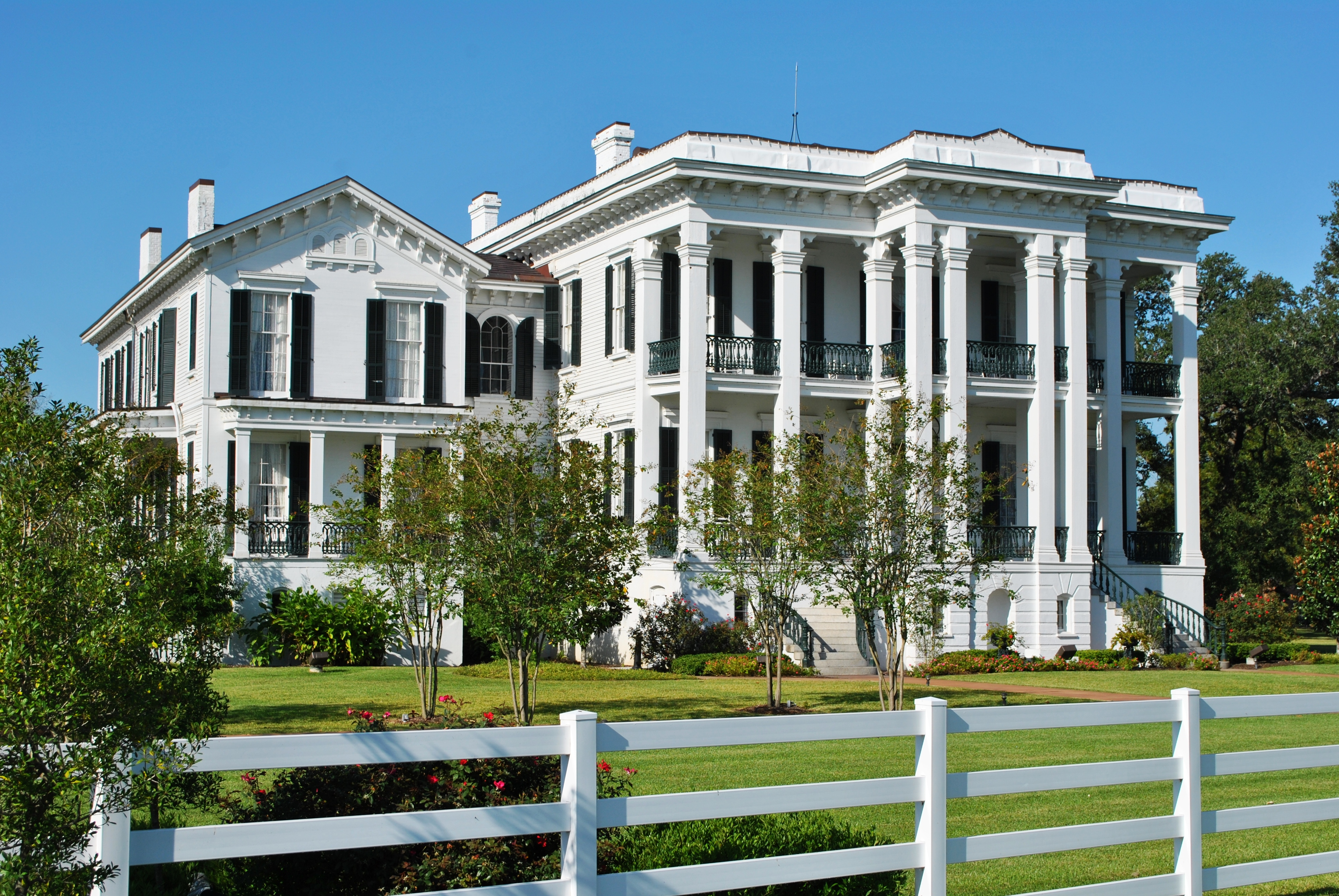
- Plantation big house, Nottoway (2011)

- Location within Louisiana Location within the United States
- Interactive map showing the location of Nottoway Plantation
- Location: 31025 LA 1
- Nearest city: White Castle, Louisiana
- Coordinates: 30°11′11″N 91°10′01″W
- Area: 15 acres (6.1 ha)
- Built: 1859
- Architect: Henry Howard
- Architectural style: Greek Revival, Italianate
- Demolished: May 15, 2025
- NRHP reference No.: 80001733
- Added to NRHP: June 6, 1980

Nottoway Plantation, also known as Nottoway Resort, and Nottoway Plantation House, is a historic plantation complex located near White Castle, Louisiana, United States. The plantation house, which was destroyed by fire in 2025, was a Greek Revival and Italianate-styled mansion built for John Hampden Randolph in 1859. With 53,000 square feet (4,900 m^{2}) of floor space, it was the second largest antebellum plantation house ever constructed in the Southern United States, sitting just behind neighboring Belle Grove Plantation in Iberville Parish. Several dependencies and historic structures remain intact on site despite the loss of the main house.

== Mansion and grounds ==
=== Architecture ===
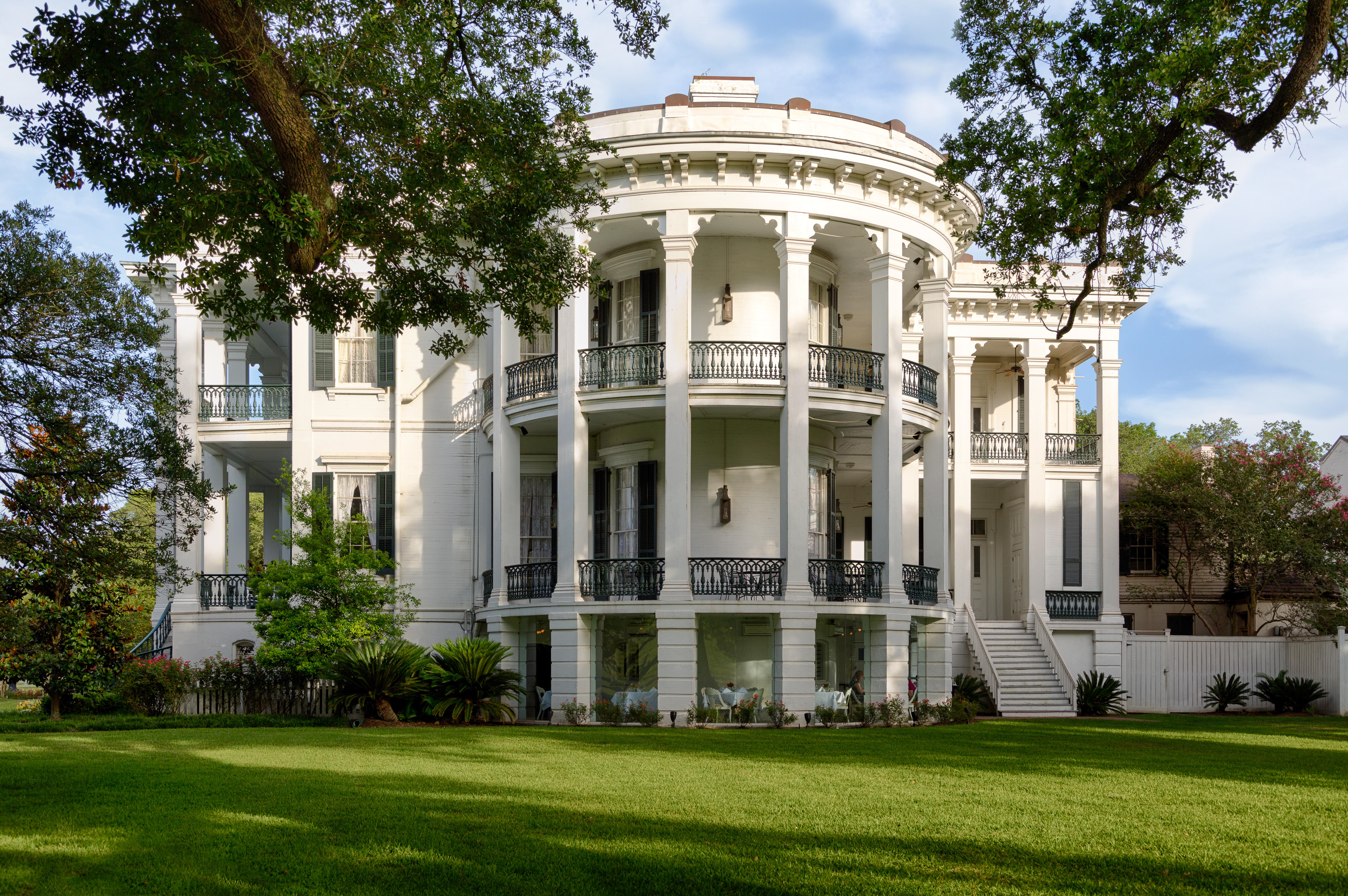
North portico of Nottoway

John Randolph commissioned renowned architect Henry Howard of New Orleans with the task of designing the grand mansion, with the intention that no expense would be spared in the construction. Howard situated the three-story wooden frame house, which includes a one-story rusticated stucco-covered brick base on a concrete foundation, to face east towards the Mississippi River. The entrance facade was asymmetrically balanced, with a projecting bedroom wing to the left side and a large curved bay with galleries on the right. The main five-bay structure, with a central projecting portico, emphasized height rather than width, with the main living areas on the second and third stories both being 15.5 feet (4.7 m) in height above the one-story basement, scored to appear as stone, and featuring an arched niche flanked with narrow fenestrations. The galleries were embellished with custom ornamental iron railings made in New Orleans and capped with molded wooden handrails. Double curved granite staircases, installed by skilled mason, Newton Richards, rose to the second story. These steps were built with the left side intended for ladies and the right for gentlemen. The boot scraper at the bottom also identified the steps for the men. The separate staircases were so that the men would not see the women's ankles beneath their skirts as they climbed, which was considered a severe breach of social etiquette at the time. The close spacing and angularity of the gallery's 22 square columns and elongated capitals also emphasized the vertical qualities of the house. Above the capitals, small brackets branched out to carry a tall entablature decorated with modillions, supporting a projecting cornice that nearly covered the hipped roof that was pierced with six chimneys. In the rear of the house was a two-story garçonnière wing where the Randolph sons resided.

Construction of Nottoway was completed in 1859 at an estimated cost of $80,000 (~$2.23 million in 2024). Randolph destroyed the architect's plans after completion to prevent any duplicate homes from being built. With 53,000 square feet (4,900 m^{2}) of floor space, it was one of the largest antebellum plantation homes in the United States, surpassed in size only by Belle Grove Plantation in neighboring Iberville Parish and potentially the Windsor Plantation in Mississippi, neither of which exist today.

=== Interiors ===
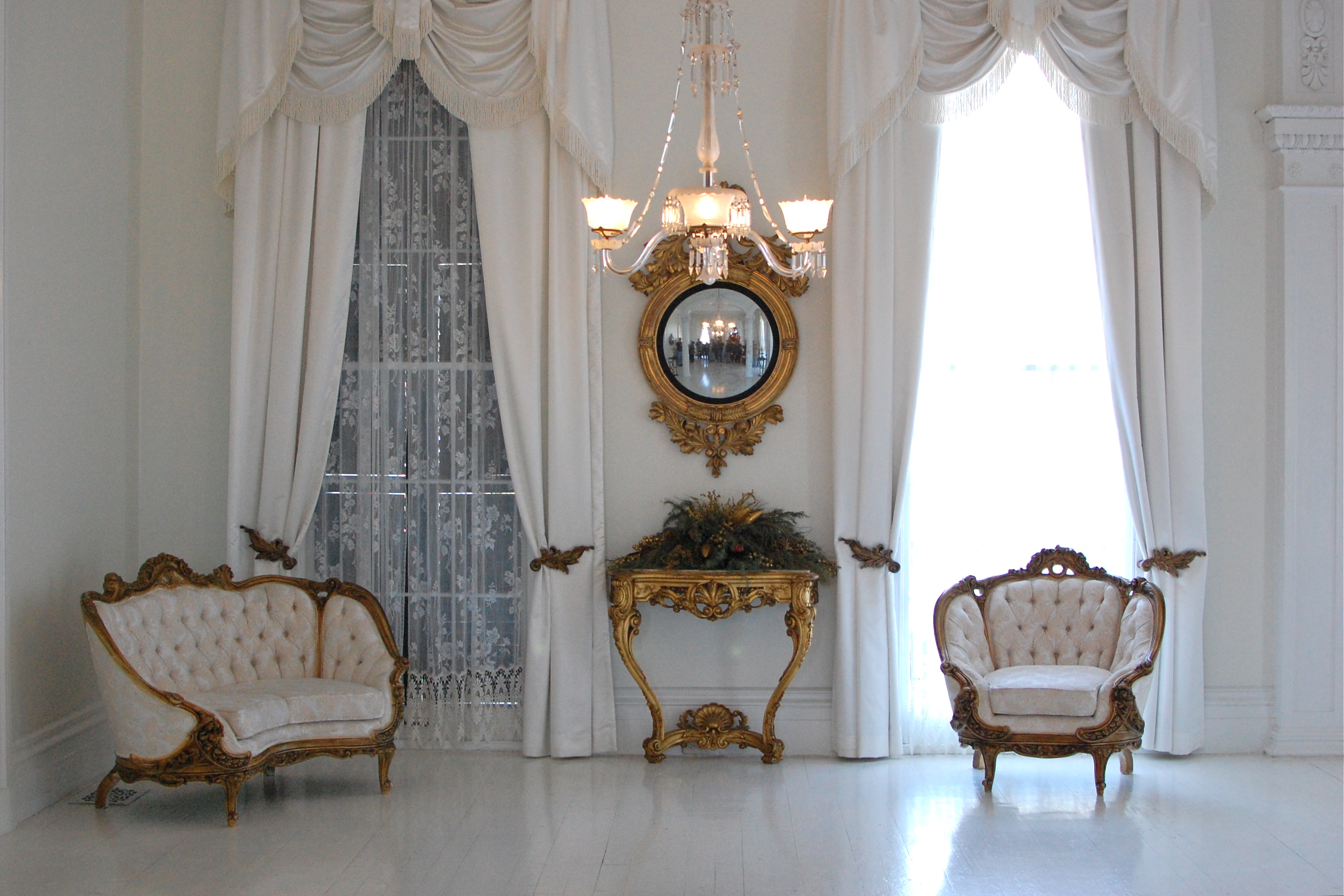
The White Ballroom

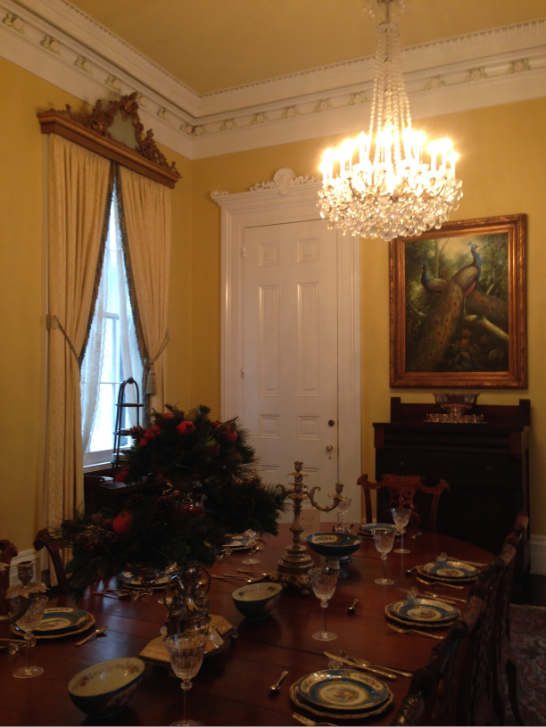
Dining Room

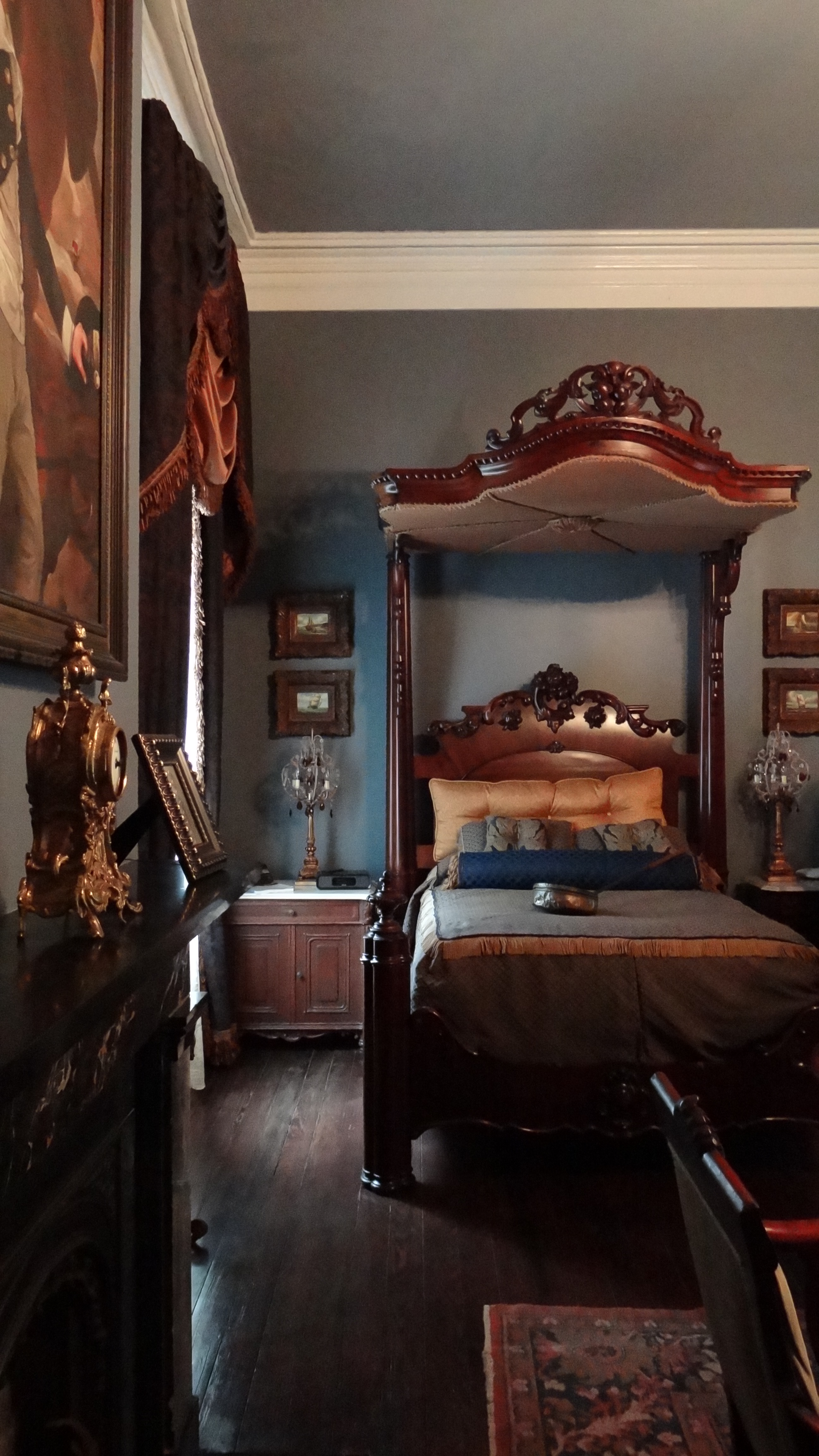
Bedroom

Nottoway had over an acre (4,050 m^{2}) of floor space spread out over three floors and a total of 64 rooms with 165 doors and 200 windows, most of which could double as doors. The house enjoyed 19th-century novelties such as a bathroom on each floor with flushing toilets and hot and cold running water, gas lighting throughout the house, and a complex servant call-bell system. The principal rooms of the house were located on the second floor. The entrance hall ran the length of the house and was 12 feet (3.7 m) wide and 40 feet (12 m) long. Large Baccarat crystal and brass chandeliers hung from the 15.5-foot (4.7 m) high ceilings, and the doors with hand-painted German Dresden porcelain doorknobs and matching keyhole covers, leading to the adjacent rooms, were 11 feet (3.4 m) tall. Above the doors and along the ceilings were plaster frieze moldings, with modillions interspersed with paterae, made from mud, clay, horse hair, and Spanish moss. To the right of the entrance hall was the most unusual, and John Randolph's favorite room in the house: the White Ballroom. With Composite columns, hand-cast archways, and an L-shaped extension into a curved bay, Randolph had it painted entirely white, including the flooring, to show off the natural beauty of his seven daughters, six of whom were married there. Featuring two fireplaces with hand-carved rococo white marble mantles, there was also an original mirror placed so that the women could see if their ankles or hoops were showing beneath their skirts. Over one of the fireplaces, there was a painting of Mary Henshaw (no relation to the family), whose eyes were said to follow the viewer around the room. Flanking the entrance hall to the left was a gentleman's study, a stair hall, and the formal dining room. The study and the dining room featured black Italian hand-carved marble mantles on their coal-burning fireplaces, and the rooms were filled with period antique furniture. The dining room plasterwork showcased pink camellias, Emily Randolph's favorite flower, and was the only plasterwork in the house to have color.

The main staircase of Honduran mahogany was covered in green velvet and ascended to the Ancestral Hall on the third floor. The hall was used by the Randolphs as a family parlor, as a central thoroughfare to many of the adjacent bedrooms, and gave access to the third-floor gallery with views of the Mississippi River. Nearby was the main bedroom, with one of the three original bathrooms, as well as a small room that was used as a nursery for Julia Marceline, Randolph's last and only child born at Nottoway. During the Civil War, Emily Randolph utilized a bedpost to hide valuable jewelry at the end of the bed. Though originally bedrooms, one had been made into a music room displaying 19th-century musical instruments, and another, known as the Wicker Room, featured wicker furniture owned by the Randolph family.

The first-floor basement had been transformed into a restaurant and a small museum about the Randolph family and the history of the plantation. Initially, the space held the laundry, dairy, wine cellar, slave quarters, and a 10-pin bowling alley for the children's amusement.

=== Grounds ===
John Nelson of New Orleans designed the Nottoway landscape to include 120 fruit and citrus trees, 12 magnolia trees, poplar, live oak trees, 75 rose bushes, 150 strawberry plants, and a variety of flower and vegetable gardens. However, due to neglect and the erosion of six and a half acres of land by the Mississippi River, the gardens designed by Nelson no longer exist. Today, the house sits only 200 feet behind a river levee, and the grounds include a small formal hedge garden adjacent to the garçonnière where the detached kitchen once stood, and a fountain courtyard in front of the southern bedroom wing. Surrounding the house are modern ancillary buildings that house offices and event facilities. The owners expanded the property in 2008 by building a carriage house, ballroom, and nine Acadian-style cottages modeled after the property's original slave quarters, while the plantation was closed to the public for repairs, as a result of damage incurred by Hurricane Gustav. To the north of the house is the reconstructed stables, now re-purposed as a ballroom, and the Randolph cemetery where the remains of the family were reinterred in 2003.

== History ==
=== 19th century ===
John Hampden Randolph was born in Virginia in 1813, a member of the prominent Randolph family. He migrated with his family to Mississippi when his father, Peter Randolph Jr., was appointed a federal judge in Woodville, Mississippi, by President James Monroe in 1820.

John Randolph married Emily Jane Liddell in 1837 and had eleven children. Randolph devoted most of his time to his cotton plantation, but believing growing sugar cane and producing sugar would be more lucrative, he decided to move his family to southern Louisiana in 1842, where he purchased a 1,650 acres (6.7 km^{2}) cotton plantation that he named Forest Home. Converting the plantation to the new crop two years later and constructing Iberville Parish's first steam-powered sugar cane mill, Randolph was able to triple his earnings over his cotton production. Within ten years, Randolph had increased his holdings to 7,116 acres (28.80 km^{2}) and acquired 176 slaves, making him one of the more prominent slaveowners in the Southern United States. In 1855, Randolph purchased an additional 400 acres (1.6 km^{2}) of highland, and 620 acres (2.5 km^{2}) of swamp and Mississippi River-front land, where he sought to build a more prestigious home that he named "Nottoway", after Nottoway County, Virginia, where he was born.

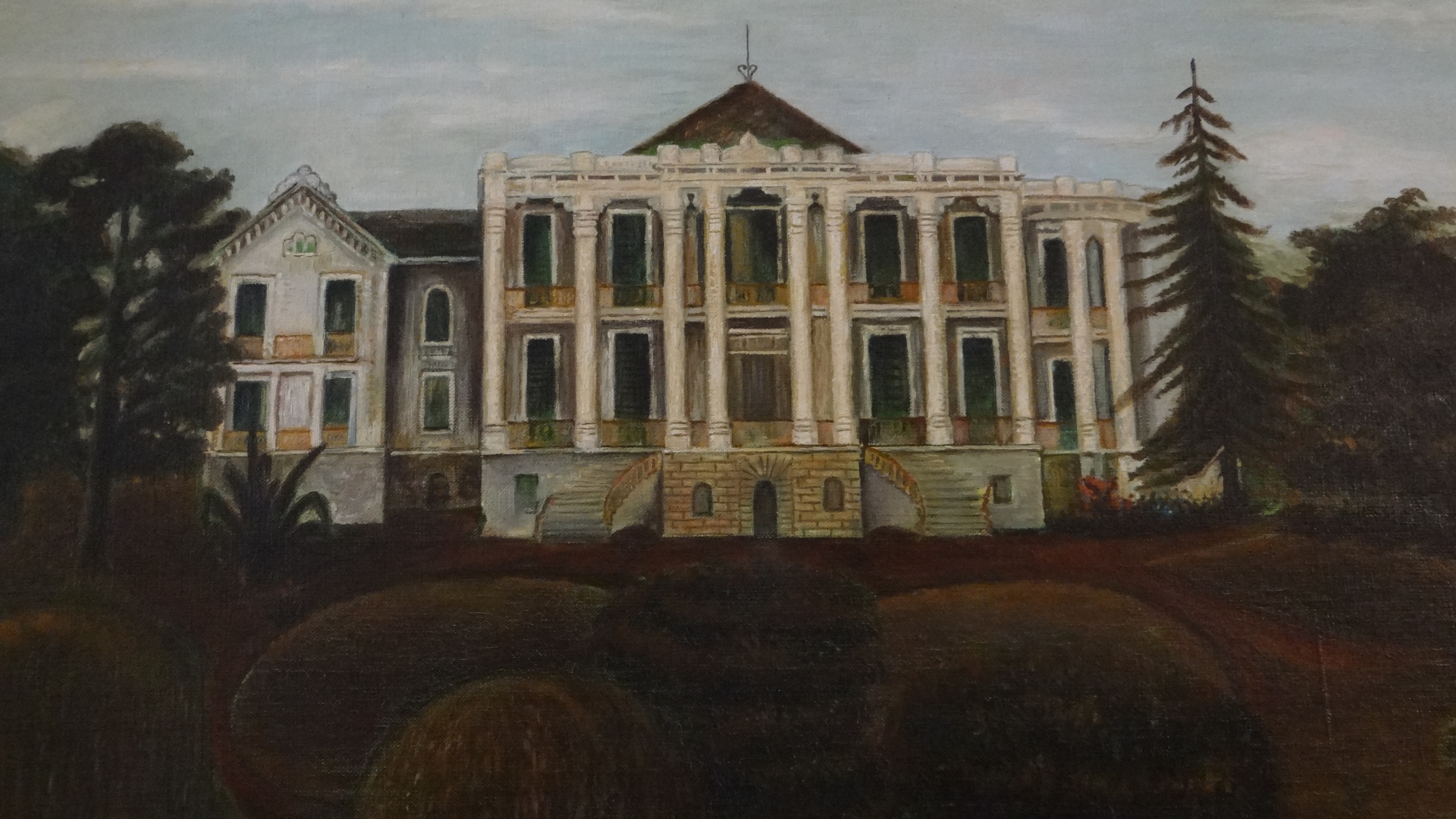
Painting by Cornelia Randolph showing original garden landscape

Randolph hired architect Henry Howard to build the plantation house. Howard also designed the neighboring Belle Grove, now also destroyed. Randolph and the owner of Belle Grove, John Andrews, were known to have had a rivalry of sorts that extended to their homes. Compiling the materials for his plantation home, cypress logs were cut and cured under water for six years, then cut into planks and dried into what is called virgin cypress. The wood's most notable feature is its durability and resistance to termites. Handmade bricks were baked in kilns by slaves and 40 carpenters, brick masons, and plumbers were hired by Howard, who lived in tents at the construction site while doing their work. The massive home was completed in 1859, along with various other buildings, including quarters for slaves, a schoolhouse, greenhouse, stable, steam-powered sugar house, wood cisterns, and other necessary buildings for an agricultural operation.

Soon after the house was completed, the American Civil War began. Randolph backed the Confederacy financially once the war began. He sent his three sons to fight for the Confederate Army, losing his oldest son, Algernon Sidney Randolph, at the Battle of Vicksburg. With the war coming ever closer to Nottoway, Randolph decided to take 200 slaves to Texas, and grow cotton there while his wife, Emily, stayed at Nottoway with the youngest children, hoping that their presence would save it from destruction. The plantation was occupied by U.S. Army and Confederate troops. Though the grounds were damaged and the animals were taken, Nottoway survived the war with only a single grapeshot to the far left column that did not fall out until 1971.

Despite the passing of the Thirteenth Amendment, 53 former slaves continued in his service as low-paid laborers. When he returned to Nottoway after the Civil War, most, having few other choices, returned with him. The sugar business was not as profitable after the war, and by 1875, Nottoway was reduced to 800 acres (3.2 km^{2}). John Randolph died at Nottoway on September 8, 1883, leaving the plantation to his wife.

Emily Randolph sold the plantation in 1889 for $50,000, which she divided equally among her nine surviving children and herself. She died in Baton Rouge in 1904.

=== 20th century ===
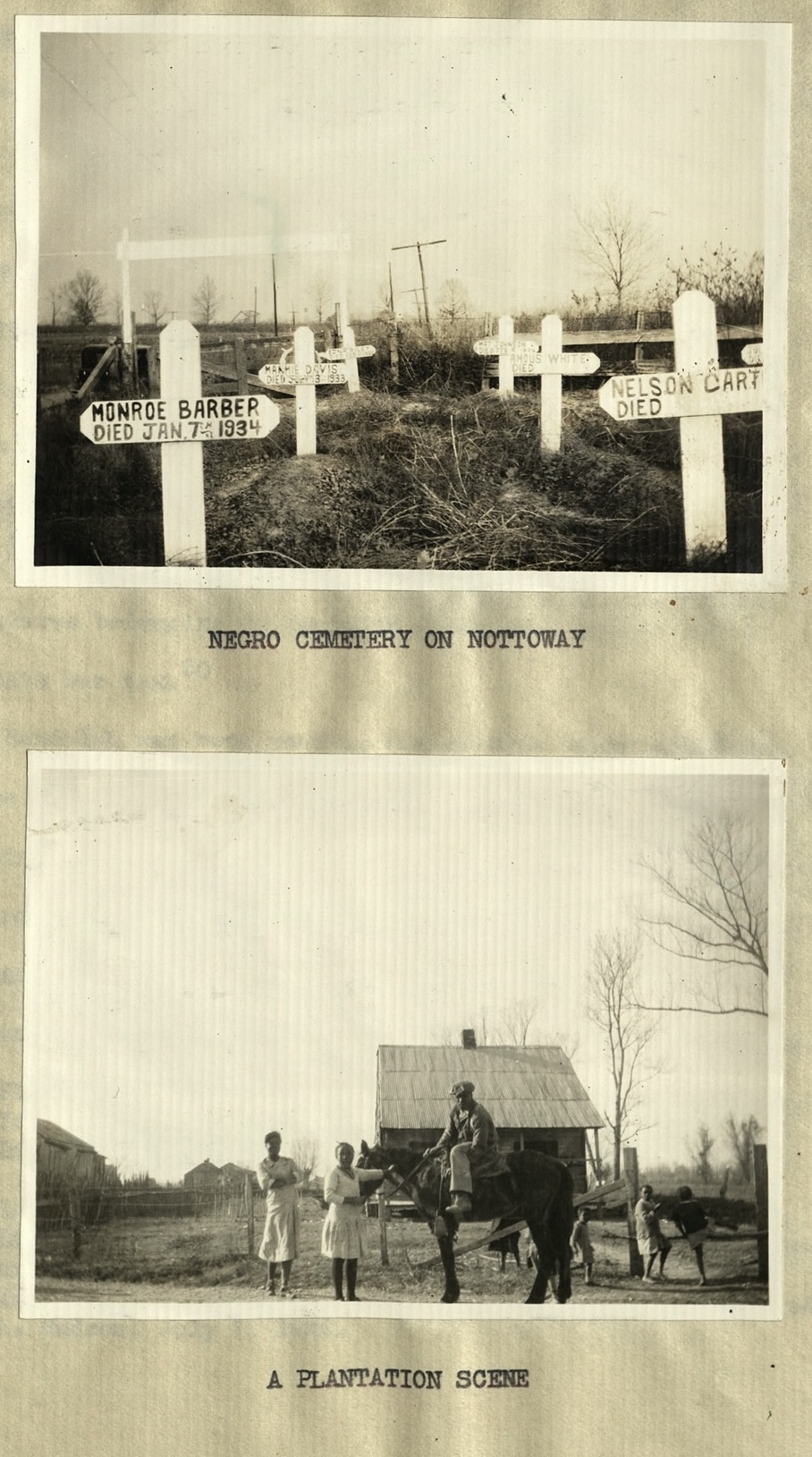
Photographs from Paul Everett Postell's 1936 thesis on John Hampden Randolph

The new owners of Nottoway were Désiré Pierre Landry and his father-in-law, Jean Baptiste Dugas, whose family owned the plantation until 1909 when Landry's widow sold Nottoway to sugar planter Alfonse Hanlon. Soon after, Hanlon lost Nottoway to foreclosure in 1913 due to crop failures the previous two years that resulted in tax problems and accrued medical bills by his wife's failing health. Dr. Whyte G. Owen purchased the plantation out of foreclosure for $10,000.

Dr. Owen, one-time Surgeon General of Louisiana, attempted to run the estate as a sugar plantation but was unsuccessful. He sold off 1,193 acres (483 ha), keeping the house and surrounding property. After he died in 1949, Nottoway was inherited by his son Stanford who lived with his wife Odessa in the house until he died in 1974. After that, Odessa Owen lived alone in the massive house, trying to maintain it with her limited resources. Knowing she was unable to care for the house adequately, Owen sold the plantation to Arlin K. Dease in 1980, who had restored three other antebellum mansions, including the Myrtles Plantation in St. Francisville, Louisiana, with the proviso that she be allowed to live in the house until her death. After she died in 2003, the house ceased to be a private home. Dease restored Nottoway, working a crew of 40 to 60 men for 12 hours a day, and opened the house to the public three months after his purchase. Arlin Dease sold Nottoway to Paul Ramsay, an Australian health care billionaire of Sydney, Australia, and Robert E. Galloway, a native of Norfolk, Virginia, in 1985, Paul Ramsay and Robert Galloway, business partners in the Ramsay Hospital Corporation, Boston, Massachusetts, also owned Sabine Medical Center, in Many, Louisiana. The Ramsay Hospital Corporation had purchased the newly built unopened River West Medical Center, in Plaquemine, opening the hospital on June 6, 1984. They envisioned the Nottoway property having the potential as an extension of health care services in the market to include a congregate care opportunity with a planned expansion of single family homes for the nearby aging population. Both had stayed at the property while in the area after opening the hospital. The Ramsay Hospital Corporation created Nottoway Properties, Inc., and operated Nottoway for many years. Nottoway was purchased for $4.5 million, and Ramsay spent more than $15 million over a two decades on the property, with expanded accommodations and amenities.

=== 21st century ===
Ramsay died in 2014. Under his tenure, Nottoway became a resort destination. The house was listed on the National Register of Historic Places in 1980 and was a popular tourist attraction in southern Louisiana. The current owner of the home is Dan Dyess, an attorney.

On May 15, 2025, a fire broke out in the southern portion of the plantation house, severely damaging much of the main house. Several structures were spared, including the garçonnière, the Overseer's Cottage, surrounding cottages, the Randolph Ballroom, and the Randolph family cemetery.

While the fire was initially contained to the south bedroom wing of the mansion, embers reignited by 6:00 PM CDT, spreading to the main block of the mansion. The main house was destroyed by the fire. The concrete foundations comprising the ground floor and remnants of the southeast side of the mansion are all that remain. Initially, the current owners of Nottoway stated they plan to rebuild and restore the historic mansion.

The fire provoked polarized reactions, with some people, particularly African Americans, celebrating the destruction of the plantation. Some news outlets criticized the plantation's marketing as a resort, arguing it downplayed the role of slavery at Nottoway. Many contrasted it with the slave-centered narratives presented at Whitney Plantation and other former plantations.

== See also ==
- National Register of Historic Places listings in Iberville Parish, Louisiana
- List of plantations in Louisiana
