= Madewood Plantation House =

- U.S. National Register of Historic Places
- U.S. National Historic Landmark
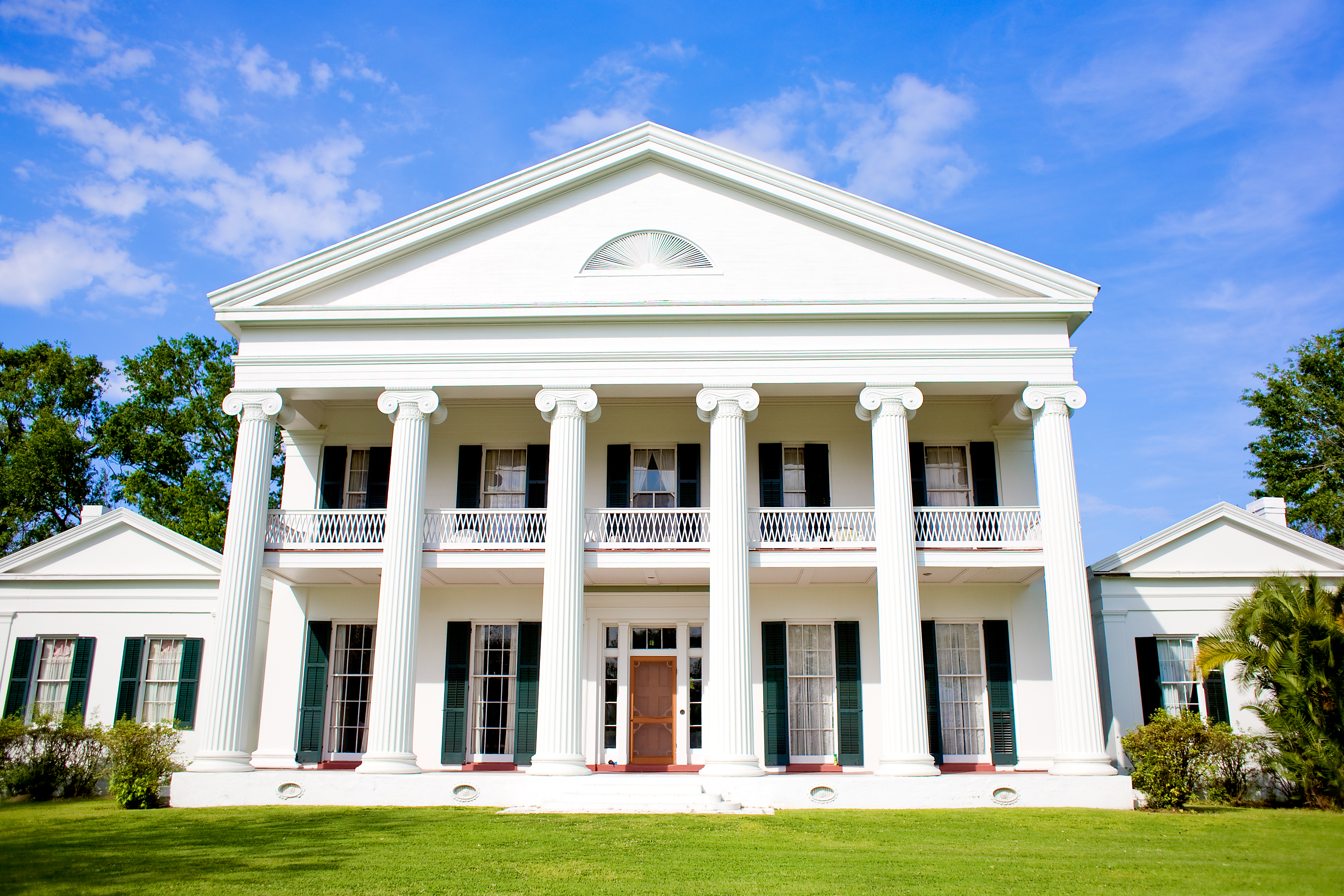
- Front of the house

- Location within Louisiana
- Location: On Madewood Road, about 2 miles (3.2 km) southeast of Napoleonville
- Coordinates: 29°55′37″N 90°59′40″W
- Area: 18 acres (7.3 ha) (landmarked area); 10,000 acres (4,000 ha) (maximum plantation size)
- Built: 1846
- Architect: Henry Howard
- Architectural style: Greek Revival
- NRHP reference No.: 73000860

Significant dates
- Added to NRHP: October 30, 1973
- Designated NHL: May 4, 1983

Madewood Plantation House, also known as Madewood, is a former sugarcane plantation house on Bayou Lafourche, near Napoleonville, Louisiana. It is located approximately two miles east of Napoleonville on Louisiana Highway 308. A National Historic Landmark, the 1846 house is architecturally significant as the first major work of Henry Howard, and as one of the finest Greek Revival plantation houses in the American South.

== Description ==
The Madewood Plantation House is located on the northern bank of Bayou Lafourche, on manicured grounds separated from the bayou by Highway 308. It is a two-story 15,000 sq ft (1,400 m^{2}) masonry, built with massive brick walls that have been finished with stucco scored to resemble stone blocks. Its five-bay facade is fronted by a six-column Greek Revival temple front, that has Ionic columns rising to a broad entablature and fully pedimented gable with a half-round louver at the center. The second-level gallery has a delicate carved balustrade. The main block is flanked on the right by a rectangular ell, and the left by an L-shaped one that extends beyond the rear of the main block. The interior exhibits high quality woodwork, mostly cypress, with some of it painted to resemble other materials, such as marble, oak, and other exotic woods.

== History ==
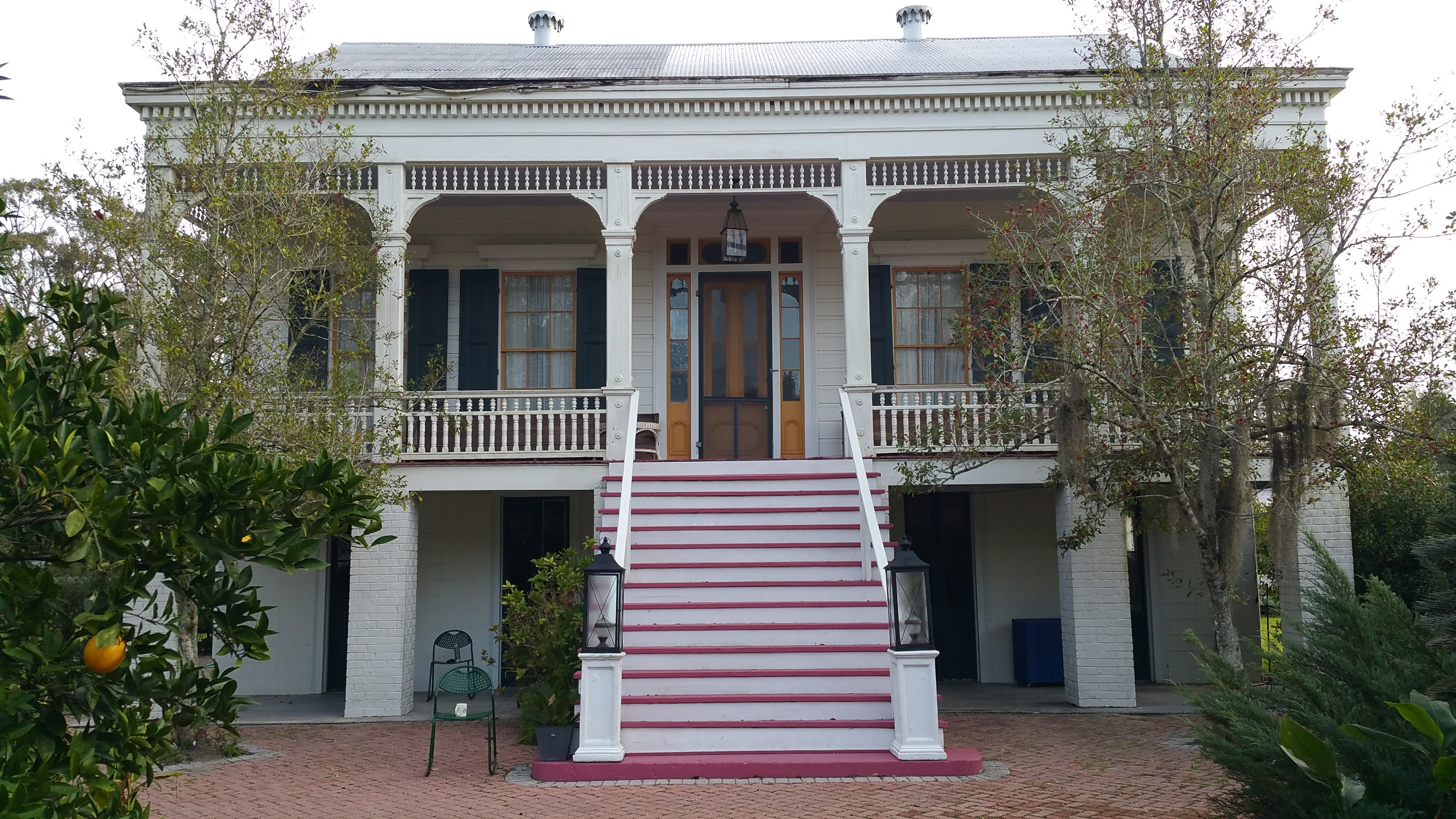
The Charlet House, the historic former home of a riverboat captain that was relocated to the grounds of Madewood by Keith Marshall when faced with demolition.

Historical marker at Madewood

The mansion was built for Colonel Thomas Pugh in 1846 and was designed by architect Henry Howard in Greek Revival style. The house was originally the manor house for a 10,000-acre (4,000 ha) sugar plantation.

Thomas Pugh was the half brother of William Whitmell Hill Pugh, who owned the Woodlawn plantation, and Alexander Franklin Pugh, part owner of the Augustin, Bellevue, Boatner, and New Hope plantations. Thomas Pugh died of yellow fever in 1852. During the Civil War, the lawns were used by Union troops as a hospital.

Robert Lee Baker purchased the house and plantation in 1916. It comprised 3,000 acres, of which 1,000 acres were under cultivation.

The Madewood house was then purchased by Harold ("H.K.") and Naomi Damonte Marshall in 1964. Naomi led a major restoration that was completed in 1978 and secured National Historic Landmark status. Their sons, Keith and Don Marshall, co-founded the Madewood Arts Festival in 1979, which featured performers from the Metropolitan Opera, the English National Opera, and New York City Opera. In 1983, Keith opened the home to the public and started a bed and breakfast on the property.

During the period of the Marshalls' stewardship, Madewood was featured in the New York Times, the Los Angeles Times, Country Roads Magazine, and other publications. In 1966, Naomi Damonte Marshall hosted future first lady Pat Nixon and her daughters Tricia and Julie Nixon.

Madewood was sold by Keith Marshall to artist Hunt Slonem in March 2018. In June 2026, Slonem sold the property.

== In popular culture ==
The plantation has been featured in several film and television productions, including A Woman Called Moses (1978), Sister, Sister (1987), and The Beguiled (2017).

Portions of Beyonce's visual album Lemonade (2016) were filmed at the location.

The music video for J. Cole's "G.O.M.D." (2015) was filmed at the plantation.

The music video for Aztec Camera's "Oblivious" (1983) was filmed at the plantation

Actor Brad Pitt once stayed at Madewood while practicing his lines for Interview with the Vampire, which was filming nearby.

Louisiana Public Broadcasting's A Taste of Louisiana with Chef John Folse & Co. featured Madewood on Episode 4 of Season 5.

Photographer Clarence John Laughlin photographed Madewood for the The Waters of Memory (Madewood Plantation) and The Luminous Columns (No. 3).

== See also ==
- National Register of Historic Places listings in Assumption Parish, Louisiana
- List of National Historic Landmarks in Louisiana
