= Old Fort House (Columbus, Mississippi) =

Historic house in Mississippi, United States

- U.S. National Register of Historic Places
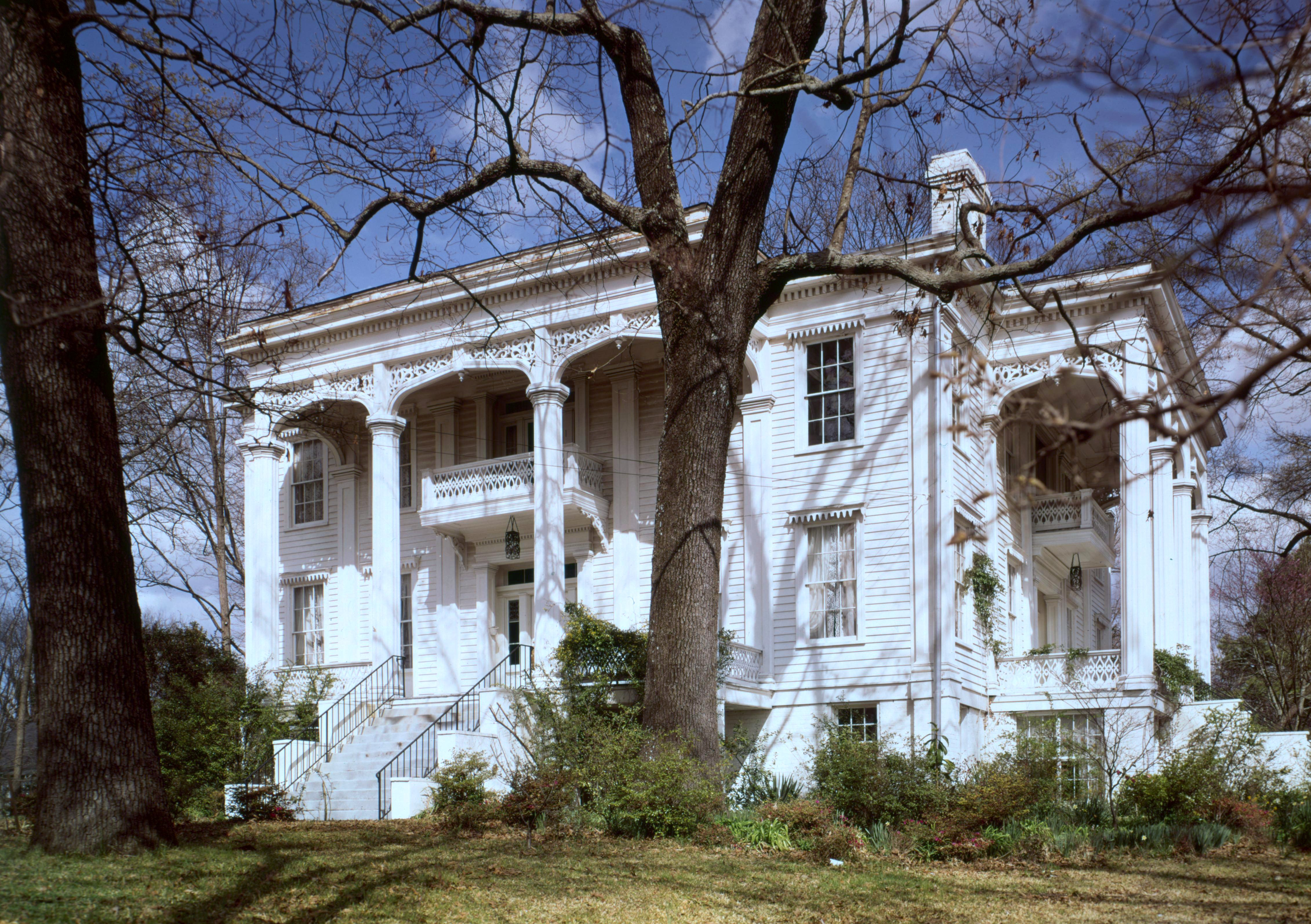

- Location within Mississippi
- Location: 510 Seventh St. N, Columbus, Mississippi
- Coordinates: 33°30′0″N 88°25′34″W
- Area: 3 acres (1.2 ha)
- Built: 1844
- Architectural style: Greek Revival, Italianate, Gothic Revival
- NRHP reference No.: 85003444
- Added to NRHP: October 31, 1985

The Old Fort House, also known as Themerlaine, is a historic Antebellum architecture mansion in Columbus, Mississippi, U.S.. Built in 1844, it was home to the wealthy Fort family, who were planters. Martha Williams Battle Fort lived here as a widow with four children after her husband, Elias Fort, died in 1834. Martha was largely responsible for the development and appearance of the house as it is today. She remained in residence until her death in 1876. Old Fort House has been listed on the National Register of Historic Places since October 31, 1985.
