= Belle Grove (Terrebonne Parish, Louisiana) =

Human settlement in Louisiana, United States of America

Coordinates: 29.57°N 90.72°W

Belle Grove (Terrebonne Parish, Louisiana) (Louisiana)

Belle Grove, was a sugarcane plantation, on the banks of the Bayou Black, Terrebonne Parish, Louisiana, built in 1847. In 1881, it was purchased by James M. McBride from the Marcellus Daunis heirs. It was demolished in the 1950s.

== See also ==
- Belle Grove Plantation (Iberville Parish, Louisiana)
