= Antebellum architecture =

19th-century Southern US architecture

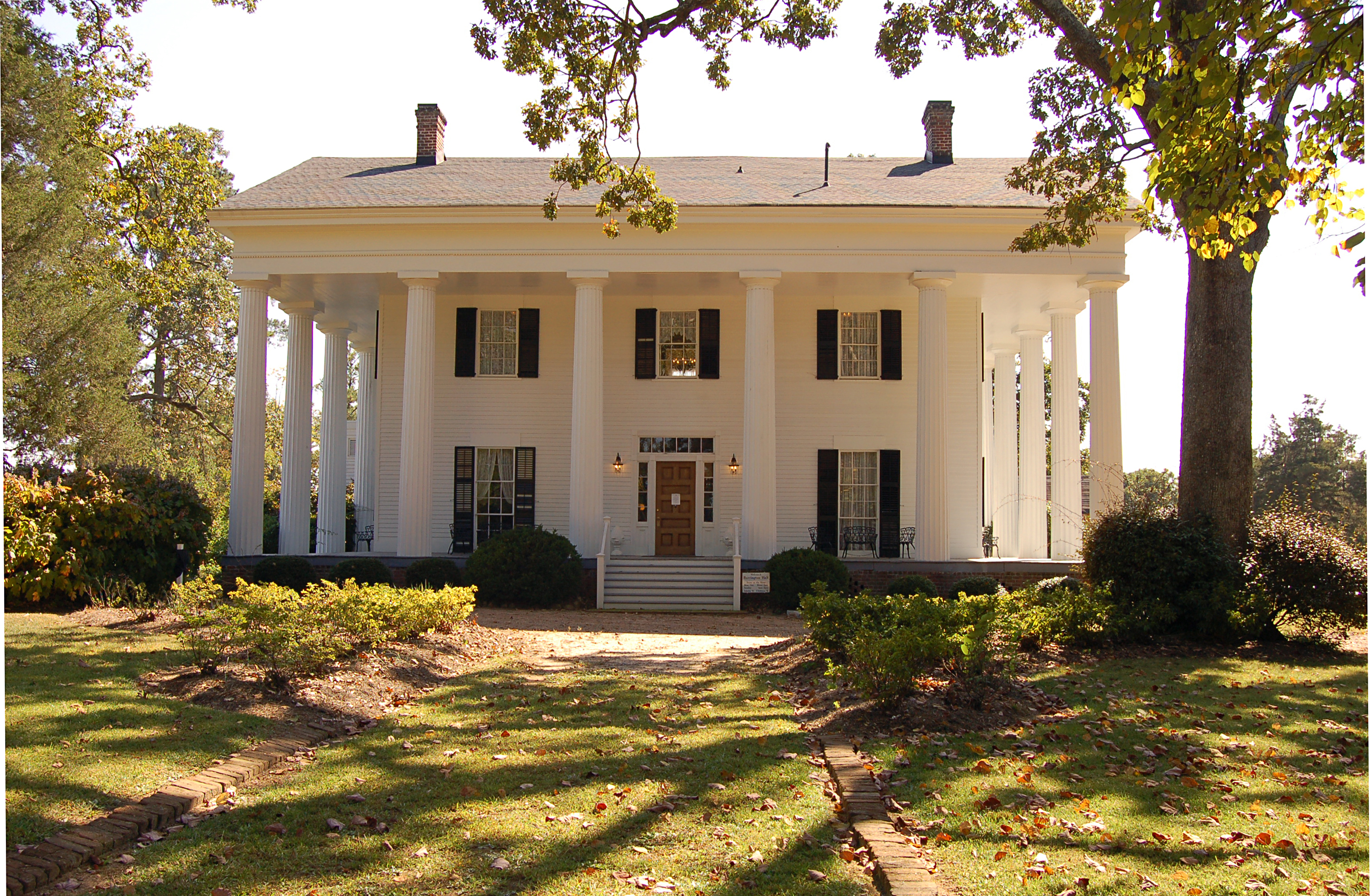
Barrington Hall is one classic example of an antebellum home.

Antebellum architecture (from Antebellum South, Latin for "pre-war") is the neoclassical architectural style characteristic of the 19th-century Southern United States, especially the Deep South, from after the birth of the United States with the American Revolution, to the start of the American Civil War. Antebellum architecture is especially characterized by Georgian, Neo-classical, and Greek Revival style homes and mansions. These plantation houses were built in the southern American states during roughly the 30 years before the American Civil War; approximately between the 1830s to 1860s.

== Characteristics ==
The Neoclassical roots of Antebellum architecture are apparent in many characteristics of the style. For example, the Greek Revival influenced Antebellum doorways, often recessed and flanked by pilastered and entablatured columns. Similarly, influences of Georgian architecture can be seen in the highly decorated entrances of Antebellum many homes, featuring colonnades and lunettes over doors.

Nevertheless, several adaptations were made from these Neoclassical influences in order to compensate for the hot subtropical climate of the southern United States. A key adaptation is a balcony, supported by large columns, that runs along the whole outside edge of the house, creating a porch that offers shade and spot to enjoy a breeze (sometimes a second-story porch, potentially for slave monitoring), and a sitting area in the cooler evenings. Additionally, evenly spaced large windows ventilated the warm air outside.

Furthermore, Antebellum-style exteriors usually featured expansive, symmetrical facades as well as elaborate decorative details. Most homes had large centered entrances at the front and rear. Hipped and gabled roof are common in antebellum architecture and often feature a cupola. Antebellum mansions were also often surrounded by grand gardens with geometrically cut bushes that complemented the symmetry of the houses. Antebellum architectural structures often have multiple stories or levels.

The interior of these mansions commonly featured enormous foyers, sweeping open stairways, ballrooms, grand dining rooms, and detailed design work. The design work included intricate shapes and patterns made from plaster used to adorn walls and furniture. It was also used to create wood and floor designs. Designs additionally include friezes, large pier glasses, and marble mantels.

=== Regional variations ===
The characteristics of Antebellum architecture can vary by region. For example, the architecture of Middle Georgia, particularly in the Oconee region, diverges from other Antebellum architecture with its use of locally sourced brick, acting as an insulator against a hotter summer climate.

== History ==
The features associated with antebellum architecture were introduced by people of largely British descent who settled in the Southern states during the colonial period and in U.S. territories after the Louisiana Purchase of 1803 along with a wave of immigration from Europe in 1812. Great numbers of Europeans seeking economic opportunities emigrated to America after Napoleon's defeat and the end of the war of 1812. This new wave of entrepreneurs began to dominate not only the economy, but also the architecture of the first half of the 19th century.

A prime example of the influence of these immigrants in antebellum architecture is Stanton Hall, a mansion whose namesake is Frederick Stanton, an immigrant from Belfast who made his fortune in trading cotton. The design was based on the Revival style. The Hall's architecture shows the increasingly connected national and global economy in which antebellum architecture emerged. The house used mantel pieces from New York, gas-burning chandeliers from Philadelphia, and mirrors from France. Similar to many antebellum homes, Stanton Hall was built using a fortune Stanton made trading cotton. During the Civil War, like many other plantation houses, the Hall was occupied by Union soldiers.

President Andrew Jackson's home, The Hermitage, is another example of antebellum architecture and the social conditions in which it arose. It was built in the Federal Style which, while losing favor in the more trendy East, was still popular in Western slave states like Tennessee. Later, renovations made the house more in line with contemporary styles, adding Doric columns and making it more Classical and Revivalist in appearance. Like other homes of its time, the Hermitage was built in a symmetrical design with equal amounts of corridors and rooms. Not just reflecting the cultural differences between the West and East in this time, the Hermitage also was part of the South's economy. The Hermitage was an active plantation which grew the period's dominant cash crop, cotton.

Antebellum architecture holds close ties with social and racial structures that existed throughout the 19th-century Southern United States. Plantations and other grand antebellum architecture constructions stood as displays of wealth and power for white Southerners, reflecting the success of the slave-based plantation economies. The design and placement of these buildings, often in the Greek Revival style, symbolized the control and dominance of the plantation economy. In contrast, the slaves who worked on these plantations saw them as representations of their oppression and subjugation.

Driskell and Trawalter (2021) explored how perception of antebellum architecture varied by race, with white Southerners viewing the buildings as symbols of identity and status, while Black individuals and enslaved people saw them largely as symbols of oppression. These differing perspectives held a role in reinforcing the social structures of the time. The relationship between antebellum architecture and the social hierarchy of the 19th century continues to be studied, as modern views of these buildings address both their architectural beauty and their historical associations with slavery.

Georgia's Old Governor's Mansion is an example of the High Greek Revival architecture of this period. The mansion, located in Milledgeville, was designed by Charles Cluskey, an Irish immigrant who emigrated to New York City in 1827 where he trained to be an architect under the firm Town and Davis, and was built by Timothy Porter in 1839. Like other antebellum homes, this mansion has Ionic columns, a covered porch, and symmetrically placed windows. For over thirty years, this mansion housed many Georgian chief executives such as George Crawford, Howell Cobb and Joseph E. Brown. It was used as a stage for their speeches, and a place to introduce important guests. This mansion also played a part in the Civil War; General William T. Sherman headquartered in the building in 1864 and it was claimed as a prize in the "March to the Sea." After the war, the mansion was abandoned when Georgia's government was moved to Atlanta.

=== Present status ===
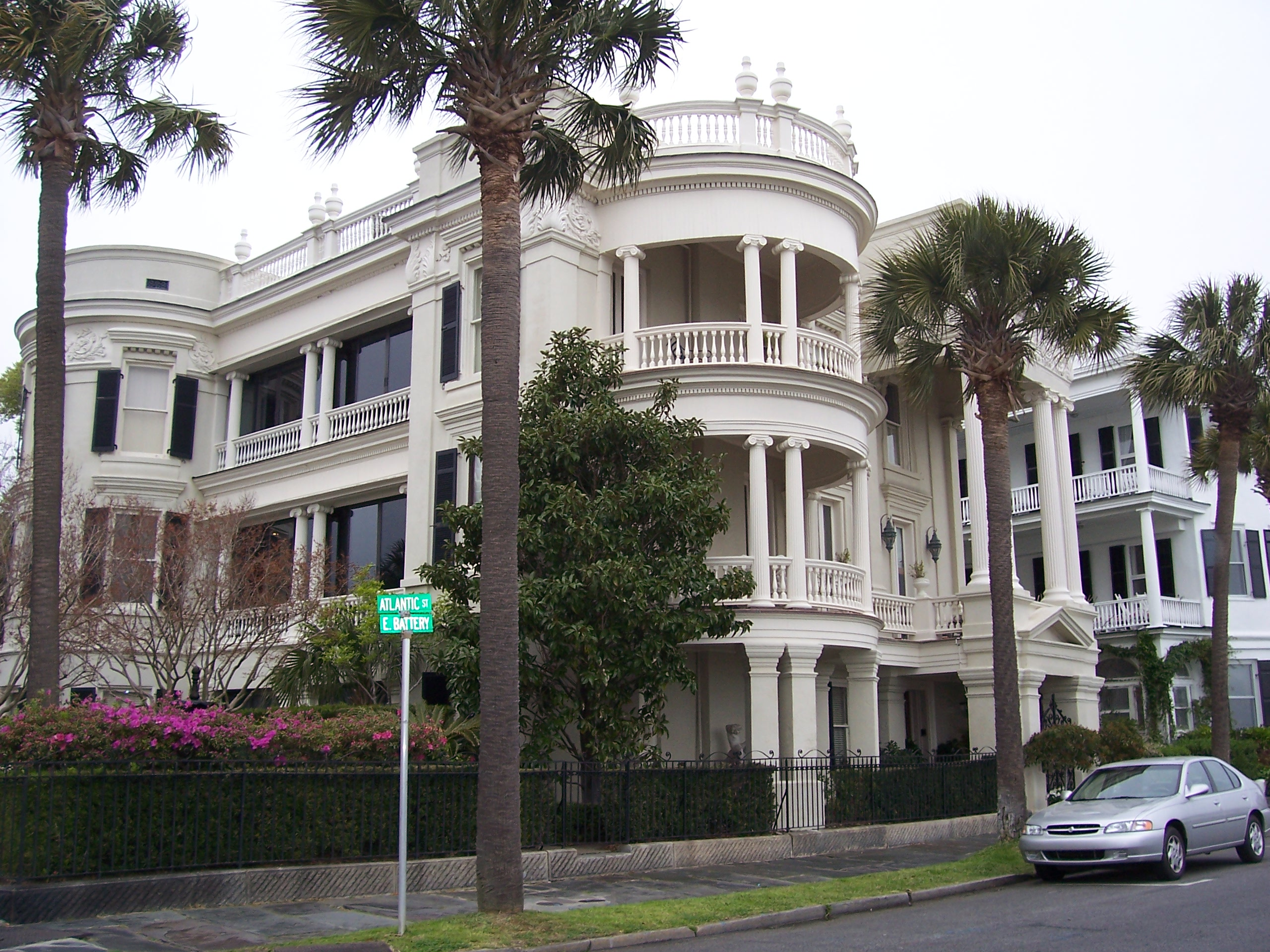
A historic home on the Battery in Charleston

An estimated 20% of antebellum mansions remain intact in the South today due to many being burned during the Civil War, as well as natural disasters and neglect. Stanton Hall, for example, was owned by the descendants of Stanton for several decades after the Civil War, but eventually the financial burden was too much and it became the Stanton College for Young Ladies.

Today, many antebellum buildings serve as museums. These museums, especially the museums located at former plantations, often attempt to show both sides of the architectural style. While celebrating the beauty of the buildings, they also tell the story of the slaves who worked the land. Boone Hall is a prime example of modern antebellum museums. The museum uses nine of the original slave cabins built between 1790 and 1810 as part of its "Black History in America" exhibit. In the exhibit, each cabin presents different aspects of slave life on the plantation, presenting to the public the country's history of slavery. Another example is Georgia's Old Governor's Mansion, which belongs to Georgia College and is its most treasured structure. In 2001, the structure began its restoration, and now serves as a museum that exhibits artifacts and gardens that showcase its history. Tours are available today that focus on the history of the building, gardens, and artifacts. The mansion was declared a National Historic Landmark in 1973.

In 2005, Hurricane Katrina struck Louisiana and Mississippi. Its effects damaged or destroyed many antebellum buildings throughout the South. This destruction once again raised the question of whether or not these buildings, as symbols of a wealthy society propped up by slavery, should be preserved. For example, Grass Lawn, an antebellum mansion in Gulfport, Mississippi, was totally destroyed by the hurricane. As the community began to raise funds to rebuild the mansion, it faced resistance from parts of the community who opposed the symbolism of the mansion. Though it eventually passed through city council, the bill funding the reconstruction was at first even voted down.

Many prime examples of antebellum architecture did not receive the same support as Grass Lawn. In the wake of Katrina, cleanups of cities often did not follow the guidelines of the National Historic Preservation Act. Hundreds of properties were destroyed with little hope of being reconstructed or commemorated. There are movements however, to preserve these historic properties. The Federal Emergency Management Agency, for example, helps to preserve important architectural properties, especially those affected by Katrina.

== Examples ==
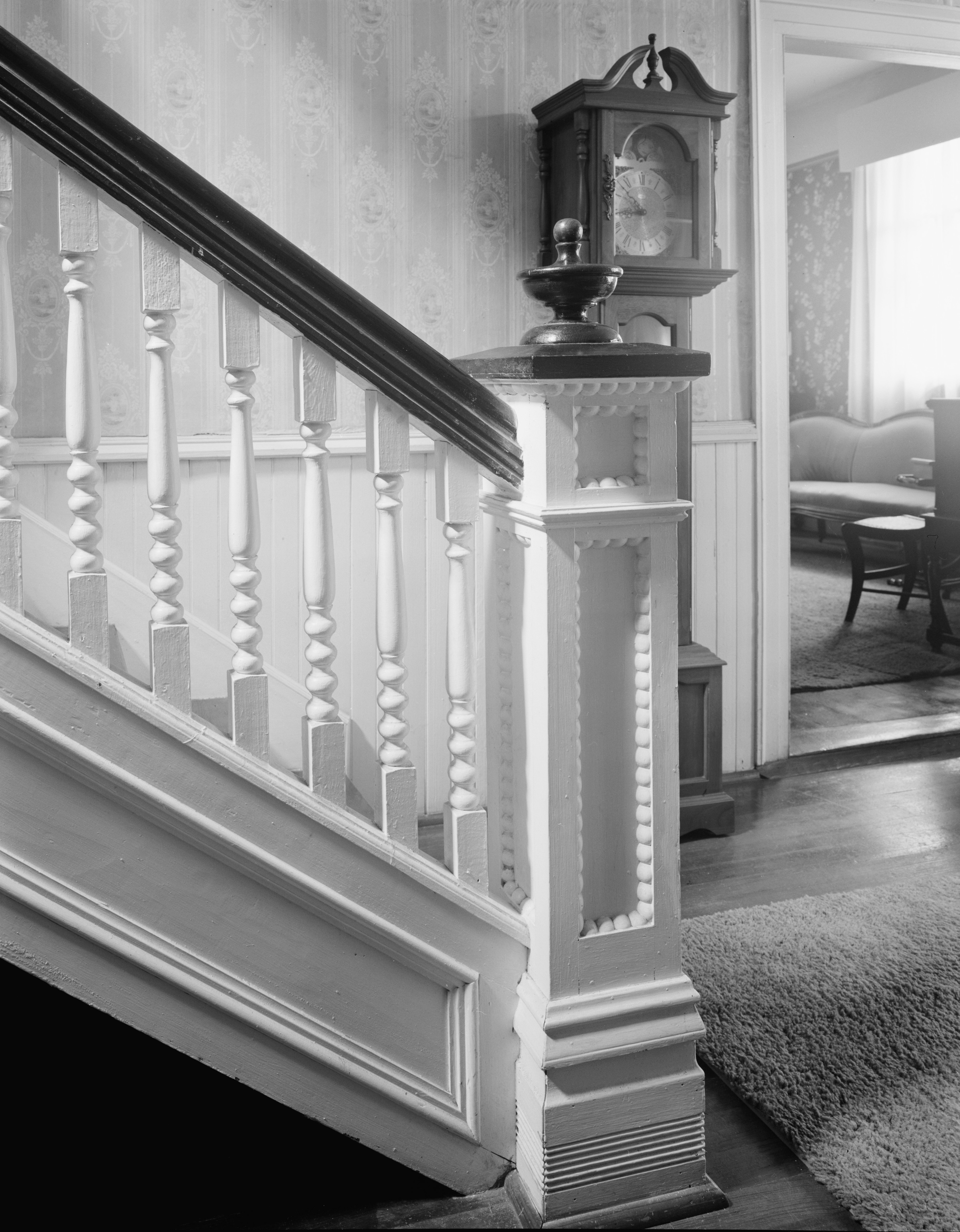
The Herndon Glanton Reeves house, built in 1845 in Troup County, Georgia, was home to several prominent citizens and used as a hospital for both Confederate and Union soldiers during the Civil War. The detail on the staircase newel and on the wall are both common features of antebellum architecture.

Many plantation houses still standing are of this style, including:

- Aduston Hall in Gainesville, Alabama
- Arlington House, The Robert E. Lee Memorial in Arlington, Virginia
- Barrington Hall in Roswell, Georgia
- Belle Grove Plantation in Iberville Parish, Louisiana, the largest plantation house ever built in the South.
- Belle Meade Plantation in Belle Meade, Tennessee
- Bermuda Hill in Prairieville, Alabama
- Berry Hill Plantation in South Boston, Virginia
- Boone Hall, near Charleston, South Carolina; built in 1936, but in the antebellum style.
- Bulloch Hall in Roswell, Georgia
- Carnton Plantation in Franklin, Tennessee
- Evergreen Plantation in Wallace, Louisiana
- Gamble Plantation Historic State Park in Ellenton, Florida
- Glen Mary Plantation in Sparta, Georgia
- Goodman-LeGrand House in Tyler, Texas
- Hunter-Dawson Home in New Madrid, Missouri
- Lansdowne in Natchez, Mississippi
- Longwood in Natchez, Mississippi
- Millford Plantation in Pinewood, South Carolina
- Monmouth Plantation, in Natchez, Mississippi
- Myrtles Plantation, in St. Francisville, Louisiana
- Nottoway Plantation in White Castle, Louisiana
- Oak Alley Plantation in Vacherie, Louisiana
- Old Fort House (Columbus, Mississippi) in Columbus, Mississippi
- Orton Plantation in Brunswick County, North Carolina
- Rippavilla Plantation in Spring Hill, Tennessee
- Rosedown Plantation in St. Francisville, Louisiana
- The Grove Plantation in Tallahassee, Florida
- The Hermitage, near Nashville, Tennessee
- Ward Hall in Georgetown, Kentucky
- Waverley in West Point, Mississippi

== See also ==
- Federal architecture
- John Scudder
