= Belle Grove Plantation (Iberville Parish, Louisiana) =

Human settlement in Louisiana, United States of America

Belle Grove
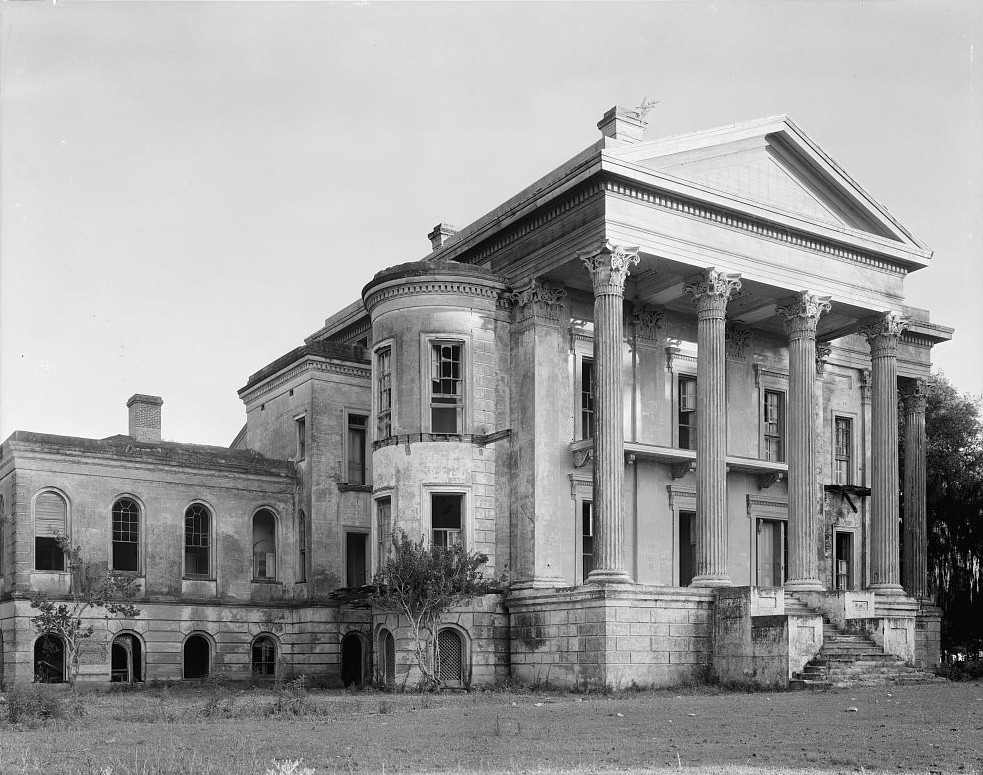
- Front (River facade) of Belle Grove in 1938
- Interactive map of Belle Grove
- 30.184507°N 91.119770°W
- Location: White Castle, Louisiana vicinity

History
- Built: 1852–1857
- Demolished: 1952

Site notes
- Architectural styles: Greek Revival and Italianate
- Governing body: Private

Belle Grove, also known as Belle Grove Plantation, was a plantation and elaborate Greek Revival and Italianate-style plantation mansion near White Castle in Iberville Parish, Louisiana. Completed in 1857, it was one of the largest mansions ever built in the Southern United States before burning down in 1952; it even surpassed that of the neighboring Nottoway, its architectural rival at the time, of which has since also been destroyed by fire. The masonry structure stood 62 feet (19 m) high and measured 122 feet (37 m) wide by 119 feet (36 m) deep, with seventy-five rooms (including a jail cell) spread over four floors.

== History ==
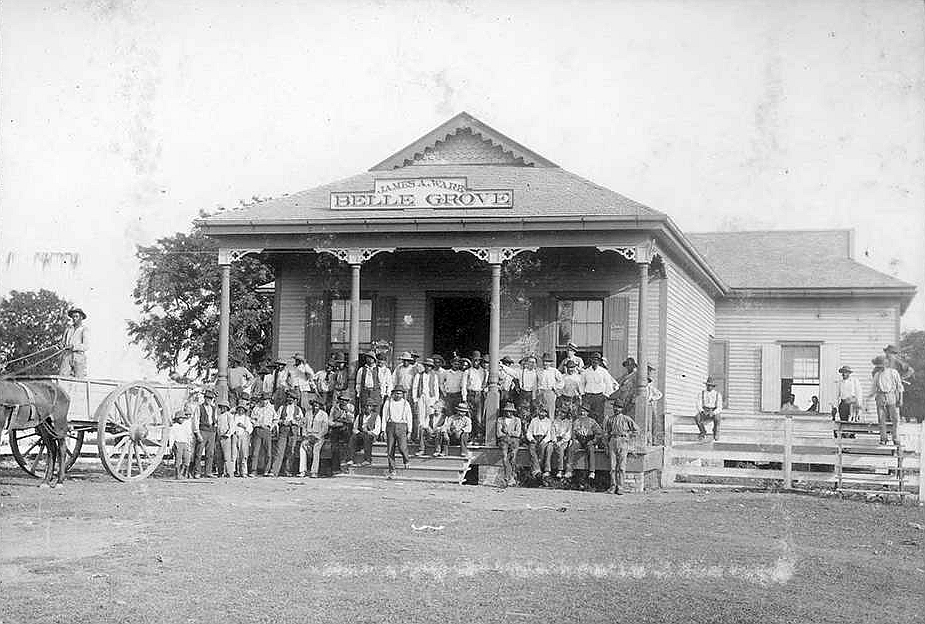
Commissary, c.1880-1917

Belle Grove was owned by John Andrews, a wealthy sugar planter originally from Virginia. He owned over 7,000 acres (2,800 ha) spread over several plantations, with Belle Grove having 3/4 mile (1.2 km) of river frontage, worked by a large community of enslaved laborers. He founded Belle Grove during the 1830s, with Dr. John Phillip Read Stone as a partner. Andrews assumed full ownership in 1844 when the partnership was dissolved. By the 1850s, the more than 150 people, mostly slaves, were producing over one-half million pounds of sugar each year.

Andrews built the mansion from 1852 to 1857 at a cost of $80,000. The house was designed by New Orleans architect Henry Howard. Andrews had a legendary rivalry with the owner of Nottoway Plantation, John Randolph. This competition even extended to their mansions, with both massive structures designed by Howard in a mix of the Greek Revival and Italianate styles.

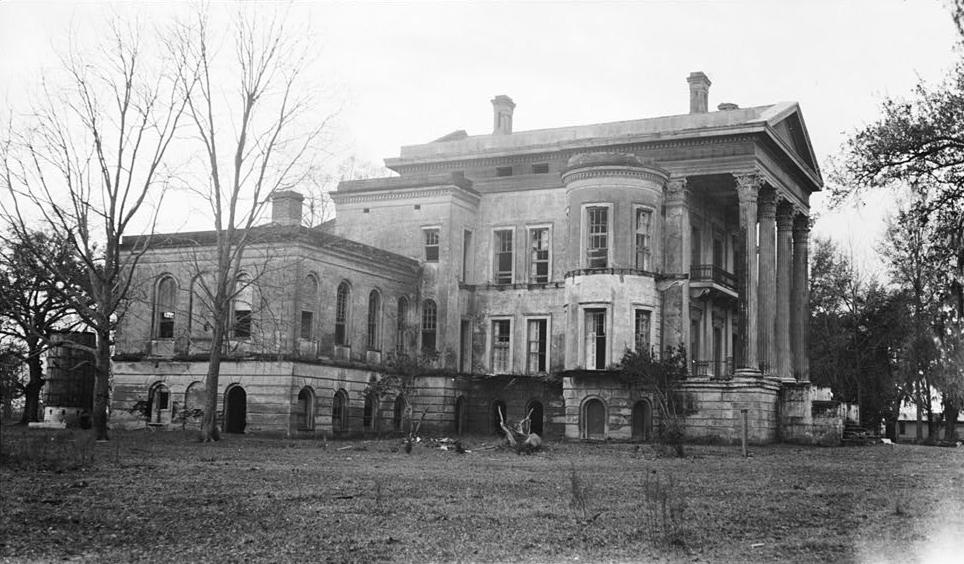
North side of the mansion in 1936

Following the American Civil War and ensuing collapse of the slave-based plantation economy, Andrews sold the home and plantation in 1868 to Henry B. Ware, for the meager sum of $12,000 (~$234,908 in 2024). Ware and his descendants owned and operated the plantation for 65 years, and two of his sons, James Andrew Ware and John M. Ware, eventually acquired it. James married Mary Eliza Stone and John married Marie-Louise Dupré, who was related to Jacque Dupré, former governor of Louisiana.

Eventually, James and Mary Eliza acquired the entire estate. James died in 1908, leaving the plantation to their son, J. Stone Ware, who oversaw the operations of the plantations until a "run of mosaic disease decimated the crops" in the mid 1920s, causing the family to abandon the plantation for good.

The succeeding decades saw the finely crafted home rot away in Louisiana's harsh environment. Neglect allowed a roof leak to expand and destroy one wing. In 1943, Frederick J. Nehrbass purchased the house and 17 acres of its original land for $2,000 (~$28,912 in 2024) with aspirations to restore it. On March 17, 1952, a mysterious fire during the night destroyed what remained of the house.

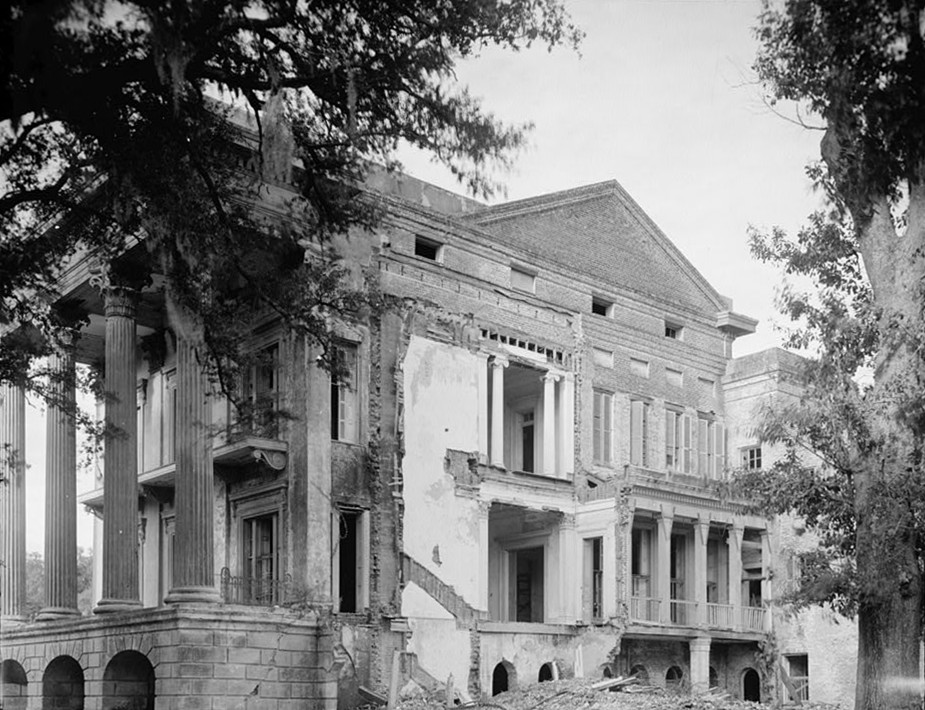
Rear view in 1936, showing total collapse of three-story rear wing

Dozens of accounts have been written about Belle Grove's beauty and charm, and hundreds of photographs of it have been published. During the late 1930s a comprehensive set of photos and architectural drawings were produced for the Historic American Buildings Survey. This material, an inventory of the house's contents made on the death of Isayah E. Henry in 1908, and a drawing of the missing wing, are available on the website of the Library of Congress.

Photographer Clarence John Laughlin described Belle Grove in his work, Ghosts Along the Mississippi:

When completed, its tremendous mass rose on huge brick foundation arches over twelve feet above the surrounding earth, its walls and mantels were plastered and carved by the most expert European craftsmen money could secure, its great flight of brick steps was covered with imported marble, its door knobs and keyhole guards were of silver, its pillars bore Corinthian capitals six feet high but of the utmost refinement. Its theatrical magnificence would have delighted the Bibiena family - seventeenth century designers of the most elaborate and grandiose stage sets for kings. Yet it was not heavy, or pompous. It managed somehow, to combine vastness with delicacy; titanic proportions with grace and warmth....

== See also ==
- Belle Grove (Terrebonne Parish, Louisiana), on Bayou Black
- List of plantations in Louisiana
