= List of census-designated places in Louisiana =

This article lists census-designated places (CDPs) in the U.S. state of Louisiana. As of the 2020 census, there were a total of 184 census-designated places in Louisiana.

== Census designated places in Louisiana ==
CDP	Parish	Parish location	Population (2020)	Population (2010)	Population (2000)	Population (1990)	Population (1980)	Notes
Ama	St. Charles		1,290	1,316	1,285	x	x	
Amelia	St. Mary		2,132	2,459	2,423	2,447	3,617	Listed as an unincorporated community in the 1970 U.S. census (pop. 2,292)
Arabi	St. Bernard		4,533	3,635	8,093	8,787	10,248	
Avondale	Jefferson		4,582	4,954	5,441	5,813	6,699	
Banks Springs	Caldwell		1,136	1,192	x	x	x	
Barataria	Jefferson		1,057	1,109	1,333	1,160	1,123	
Bawcomville	Ouachita		3,472	3,588	x	x	x	Formed out of the deleted Brownsville-Bawcomville CDP after the 2000 U.S. census
Bayou Blue	Lafourche and Terrebonne		13,352	12,352	x	x	x	
Bayou Cane	Terrebonne		19,770	19,335	17,046	15,876	15,723	Listed as an unincorporated community in the 1970 U.S. census (pop. 9,077), 1960 U.S. census (pop. 3,173), and 1950 U.S. census (pop. 2,212)
Bayou Corne	Assumption		32	x	x	x	x	
Bayou Country Club	Lafourche		1,304	1,396	x	x	x	
Bayou Gauche	St. Charles		2,161	2,071	1,770	x	x	
Bayou Goula	Iberville		514	612	x	x	x	
Bayou L'Ourse	Assumption		1,806	1,978	x	x	x	
Bayou Vista	St. Mary		4,213	4,652	4,351	4,733	5,805	Listed as an unincorporated community in the 1970 U.S. census (pop. 5,121)
Belle Chasse	Plaquemines		10,579	12,679	9,848	8,512	5,412	
Belle Rose	Assumption		1,698	1,902	1,944	x	x	
Belmont	Sabine		305	361	x	x	x	
Boothville	Plaquemines		718	854	x	x	x	Formed out of the Boothville-Venice CDP after the 2000 U.S. census
Bordelonville	Avoyelles		458	525	x	x	x	
Bourg	Terrebonne		2,375	2,579	x	x	x	
Boutte	St. Charles		3,054	3,075	2,181	2,702	x	
Branch	Acadia		431	388	x	x	x	
Bridge City	Jefferson		7,219	7,706	8,323	8,327	x	
Brownfields	East Baton Rouge		5,145	5,401	5,222	5,229	x	
Brownsville	Ouachita		4,353	4,317	x	x	x	Formed out of the deleted Brownsville-Bawcomville CDP after the 2000 U.S. census
Buras	Plaquemines		1,109	945	x	x	x	Formed out of the Buras-Triumph CDP after the 2000 U.S. census
Cade	St. Martin		1,874	1,723	x	x	x	
Calhoun	Ouachita		670	679	x	x	x	
Cameron	Cameron		315	406	1,965	2,041	1,736	
Carlyss	Calcasieu		5,101	4,670	4,049	3,305	1,806	
Catahoula	St. Martin		988	1094	x	x	x	
Cecilia	St. Martin		1,807	1,980	1,505	1,374	x	
Center Point	Avoyelles		520	492	x	x	x	
Centerville	St. Mary		499	x	x	x	x	
Chackbay	Lafourche		5,370	5,177	4,018	2,276	x	
Chalmette	St. Bernard		21,562	16,751	32,069	31,860	33,847	
Charenton	St. Mary		1,699	1,903	1,944	1,584	x	
Chauvin	Terrebonne		2,575	2,912	3,229	3,375	3,338	
Choctaw	Lafourche		775	879	x	x	x	
Claiborne	Ouachita		12,631	11,507	9,830	8,300	6,278	
Convent	St. James		483	711	x	x	x	
Crescent	Iberville		811	959	x	x	x	
Cut Off	Lafourche		5,533	5,976	5,635	5,325	5,049	
Darrow	Ascension		200	x	x	x	x	
Delacroix	St. Bernard		48	x	x	x	x	
Des Allemands	Lafourche and St. Charles		2,179	2,505	2,500	2,504	2,920	
Destrehan	St. Charles		11,340	11,535	11,260	8,031	2,382	
Deville	Rapides		1,761	1,764	1,007	1,113	x	
Dorseyville	Iberville		159	x	x	x	x	
Dulac	Terrebonne		1,241	1,463	2,458	3,273	x	
Eastwood	Bossier		4,390	4,093	3,374	2,987	x	
Echo	Rapides		352	x	x	x	x	
Eden Isle	St. Tammany		7,782	7,041	6,261	3,768	x	
Edgard	St. John the Baptist		1,948	2,441	2,637	2,753	x	
Egan	Acadia		618	631	x	x	x	
Elmwood	Jefferson		5,649	4,635	4,270	x	x	
Empire	Plaquemines		905	993	2,211	2,654	x	
Erwinville	West Baton Rouge		2,275	2,192	x	x	x	
Estelle	Jefferson		17,952	16,377	15,880	14,091	x	
Fifth Ward	Avoyelles		921	800	x	x	x	
Fort Jesup	Sabine		494	509	x	x	x	
Fort Johnson North	Vernon		2,179	2,864	3,279	3,819	1,644	
Fort Johnson South	Vernon		7,950	9,038	11,000	10,911	12,498	
Frierson	DeSoto		132	143	x	x	x	
Galliano	Lafourche		7,100	7,676	7,356	4,294	5,159	
Gardere	East Baton Rouge		13,203	10,580	8,992	7,209	x	
Garyville	St. John the Baptist		2,123	2,811	2,775	3,181	2,856	Listed as an unincorporated community in the 1970 U.S. census (pop. 2,474), 1960 U.S. census (pop. 2,839), and 1950 U.S. census (pop. 1,850).
Gillis	Calcasieu		800	657	x	x	x	
Glencoe	St. Mary		132	211	x	x	x	
Gloster	DeSoto		53	94	x	x	x	
Good Pine	LaSalle		259	x	x	x	x	
Grand Point	St. James		2,241	2,473	x	x	x	
Gray	Terrebonne		5,518	5,584	4,958	4,260	x	
Hackberry	Cameron		926	1,261	1,699	1,664	1,601	
Hahnville	St. Charles		2,959	3,344	2,792	2,599	2,947	Listed as an unincorporated community in the 1970 U.S. census (pop. 2,483) and 1960 U.S. census (pop. 1,297).
Harvey	Jefferson		22,236	20,348	22,226	21,222	22,709	First appeared as an unincorporated community in the 1970 U.S. census (pop. 6,347).
Hayes	Calcasieu		676	780	x	x	x	
Hester	St. James		483	498	x	x	x	
Jefferson	Jefferson		10,633	11,193	11,843	14,521	15,550	Listed as an unincorporated place in the 1970 U.S. census (pop. 16, 489) and the 1960 U.S. census (pop. 19,353).
Jordan Hill	Winn		196	211	x	x	x	
Joyce	Winn		328	384	x	x	x	
Killona	St. Charles		724	793	797	x	x	
Kraemer	Lafourche		877	934	x	x	x	
Labadieville	Assumption		1,715	1,854	1,811	1,821	2,138	
Lacassine	Jefferson Davis		490	480	x	x	x	
Lacombe	St. Tammany		8,657	8,679	7,518	6,523	x	
Lafitte	Jefferson		1,014	972	1,576	1,507	1,312	First appeared as an unincorporated place in the 1970 U.S. census (pop. 1,223).
Lafourche Crossing	Lafourche		2,427	2,002	x	x	x	
Lakeshore	Ouachita		1,988	1,930	x	x	x	
Lakeview	Caddo		818	948	x	x	x	
Laplace	St. John the Baptist		28,841	29,872	27,684	24,194	16,112	Listed as an unincorporated community in the 1970 U.S. census (pop. 5,953), 1960 U.S. census (pop. 3,541), and 1950 U.S. census (pop. 5,953).
Larose	Lafourche		6,763	7,400	7,306	5,772	5,234	Listed as an unincorporated community in the 1970 U.S. census (pop. 4,267), 1960 U.S. census (pop. 2,796), and 1950 U.S. census (pop. 1,286).
Lawtell	St. Landry		1,066	1,198	x	x	x	
Lemannville	Ascension and St. James		695	860	x	x	x	
Lewisburg	St. Tammany		420	x	x	x	x	
Lockport Heights	Lafourche		1,171	1,286	x	x	x	
Longville	Beauregard		545	635	x	x	x	
Luling	St. Charles		13,716	12,119	11,512	2,803	4,006	Listed as an unincorporated community in the 1970 U.S. census (pop. 3,255) and 1960 U.S. census (pop. 2,122).
Lydia	Iberia		892	952	1,079	1,136	x	
Marrero	Jefferson		32,382	33,141	36,165	36,671	36,548	First appeared as an unincorporated community in the 1970 U.S. census (pop. 29,015).
Marthaville	Natchitoches		90	x	x	x	x	
Mathews	Lafourche		2,273	2,209	2,003	3,009	x	
Meraux	St. Bernard		6,804	5,816	10,192	8,849	x	
Merrydale	East Baton Rouge		9,227	9,772	10,427	9,227	x	
Metairie	Jefferson		143,507	138,481	146,136	149,428	164,160	First appeared as an unincorporated community in the 1970 U.S. census (pop. 135,816).
Midland	Acadia		249	x	x	x	x	
Midway	LaSalle		1,157	1,586	1,505	1,586	x	
Milton	Lafayette		2,590	3,030	x	x	x	
Minorca	Concordia		2,156	2,317	x	x	x	
Montegut	Terrebonne		1,465	1,540	1,803	1,784	x	
Monterey	Concordia		474	439	x	x	x	
Monticello	East Baton Rouge		5,431	5,172	4,763	4,710	x	
Montz	St. Charles		2,106	1,918	1,120	x	x	
Moonshine	St. James		168	194	x	x	x	
Morrow	St. Landry		149	x	x	x	x	
Moss Bluff	Calcasieu		12,522	11,557	10,535	8,039	7,004	
Natalbany	Tangipahoa		2,510	2,984	1,739	1,289	x	
New Orleans Station	Plaquemines		2,508	x	x	x	x	
New Sarpy	St. Charles		1,169	1,464	1,568	2,946	1,643	Listed as an unincorporated community in the 1970 U.S. census (pop. 1,643) and 1960 U.S. census (pop. 1,259).
Norco	St. Charles		2,984	3,074	3,579	3,385	4,416	Listed as an unincorporated community in the 1970 U.S. census (pop. 4,773) and 1960 U.S. census (pop. 4,682).
North Vacherie	St. James		2,093	2,346	2,411	2,354	x	
Oretta	Beauregard		371	418	x	x	x	
Ossun	Lafayette		2,145	2,144	x	x	x	
Paincourtville	Assumption		857	911	884	1,550	2,004	
Paradis	St. Charles		1,242	1,298	1,252	x	x	
Paulina	St. James		1,778	1,178	x	x	x	
Perry	Vermilion		1,171	x	x	x	x	
Pierre Part	Assumption		3,024	3,169	3,239	3,053	3,153	
Pitkin	Vernon		455	576	x	x	x	
Pleasure Bend	St. John the Baptist		212	250	x	x	x	
Pointe a la Hache	Plaquemines		183	187	x	x	x	
Point Place	Natchitoches		382	400	x	x	x	
Port Sulphur	Plaquemines		1,677	1,760	3,115	3,523	3,318	
Poydras	St. Bernard		2,536	2,351	3,886	4,029	5,722	
Prairieville	Ascension		33,197	26,895	x	x	x	
Presquille	Terrebonne		1,703	1,807	x	x	x	
Prien	Calcasieu		7,745	7,810	7,215	6,448	6,224	
Prospect	Grant		380	476	x	x	x	
Raceland	Lafourche		9,768	10,193	10,224	5,564	6,302	Listed as an unincorporated community in the 1970 U.S. census (pop. 4,880), 1960 U.S. census (pop. 3,666), and 1950 U.S. census (pop. 2,025)
Red Chute	Bossier		7,065	6,261	5,984	5,431	x	
Reddell	Evangeline		904	733	x	x	x	
Reserve	St. John the Baptist		8,541	9,766	9,111	8,847	7,288	Listed as an unincorporated community in the 1970 U.S. census (pop. 6,381), 1960 U.S. census (pop. 5,297), and 1950 U.S. census (pop. 4,465).
Rio	Washington		137	x	x	x	x	
River Ridge	Jefferson		13,591	13,494	14,588	14,800	17,146	
Roanoke	Jefferson Davis		491	546	x	x	x	
Rock Hill	Grant		260	274	x	x	x	
Romeville	St. James		99	130	x	x	x	
St. James	St. James		592	828	x	x	x	
St. Maurice	Winn		266	323	x	x	x	
St. Rose	St. Charles		7,504	8,122	6,450	6,259	x	Listed as an unincorporated community in the 1970 U.S. census (pop. 2,106) and 1960 U.S. census (pop. 1,099). The census did not survey the CDP in the 1980 U.S. Census.
Schriever	Terrebonne		6,711	6,853	5,880	4,958	x	
Singer	Beauregard		303	287	x	x	x	
Siracusaville	St. Mary		297	422	x	x	x	
Sorrel	St. Mary		711	766	x	x	x	
South Vacherie	St. James		3,388	3,642	3,543	3,462	x	
Spokane	Concordia		378	442	x	x	x	
Starks	Calcasieu		659	664	x	x	x	
Start	Richland		982	905	x	x	x	
Sugartown	Beauregard		33	54	x	x	x	
Supreme	Assumption		839	1,052	1,119	1,020	x	
Swartz	Ouachita		4,354	4,536	4,247	3,698	x	
Taft	St. Charles		61	63	0	x	x	
Terrytown	Jefferson		25,278	23,319	25,430	23,787	23,548	First appeared as an unincorporated community in the 1970 U.S. census (pop. 13,832).
Timberlane	Jefferson		10,364	10,243	11,405	12,614	11,579	
Triumph	Plaquemines		268	216	x	x	x	Formed out of the Buras-Triumph CDP after the 2000 U.S. census
Trout	LaSalle		104	x	x	x	x	
Union	St. James		735	892	x	x	x	
Venice	Plaquemines		162	202	x	x	x	Formed out of the Boothville-Venice CDP after the 2000 U.S. census
Ventress	Pointe Coupee		800	890	x	x	x	
Vienna Bend	Natchitoches		1,314	1,251	x	x	x	
Violet	St. Bernard		5,758	4,973	8,555	8,574	11,678	
Waggaman	Jefferson		9,835	10,015	9,435	9,405	9,004	
Wallace	St. John the Baptist		755	671	570	x	x	
Wallace Ridge	Catahoula		572	710	x	x	x	
Watson	Livingston		956	1,047	x	x	x	
Welcome	St. James		672	800	x	x	x	
Woodmere	Jefferson		11,238	12,080	13,058	x	x	

== Former census designated places in Louisiana ==
CDP	Population	Parish	Population (2020)	Population (2010)	Population (2000)	Population (1990)	Population (1980)	Notes
Brownsville-Bawcomville	Ouachita		x	x	7,616	7,397	7,616	Split into the Bawcomville and Brownsville CDPs prior to the 2010 U.S. census
Boothville-Venice	Plaquemines		x	x	2,220	2,743	x	Split into the Boothvill and Venice CDPs prior to the 2010 U.S. census
Buras-Triumph	Plaquemines		x	x	3,358	4,133	4,908	Appeared as an unincorporated plave in the 1970 U.S. census (pop. 4,133), the 1960 U.S. census (pop 4,908), and the 1950 U.S. census (pop. 1,799). Split into the Buras and Triumph CDPs prior to the 2010 U.S. census
Inniswold	East Baton Rouge		5,987	6,180	4,944	3,474	x	Absorbed into the newly formed city of St. George after the 2020 U.S. census
Oak Hills Place	East Baton Rouge		9,239	8,195	7,996	5,479	x	Absorbed into the newly formed city of St. George after the 2020 U.S. census
Old Jefferson	East Baton Rouge		7,339	6,980	5,631	4,531	x	Absorbed into the newly formed city of St. George after the 2020 U.S. census
Shenandoah	East Baton Rouge		19,292	18,399	17,070	13,429	x	Absorbed into the newly formed city of St. George after the 2020 U.S. census
Village St. George	East Baton Rouge		7,677	7,104	6,993	6,242	x	Absorbed into the newly formed city of St. George after the 2020 U.S. census
West Ferriday	East Baton Rouge		x	x	1,541	1,632	1,399	Deleted prior to the 2010 U.S. census
Westminster	East Baton Rouge		2,791	3,008	2,515	2,582	x	Absorbed into the newly formed city of St. George after the 2020 U.S. census

== See also ==
- List of cities, towns, and villages in Louisiana
- List of unincorporated communities in Louisiana
- Louisiana census statistical areas
