= Romeville, Louisiana =

- Unincorporated community
- Location within Louisiana Location within the United States
- Coordinates: 30°03′45″N 90°50′48″W
- Country: United States
- State: Louisiana
- Parish: St. James

Area
  - Total: 3.56 sq mi (9.23 km^{2})
  - Land: 3.24 sq mi (8.40 km^{2})
  - Water: 0.32 sq mi (0.83 km^{2})
- Elevation: 23 ft (7.0 m)

Population (2020)
  - Total: 99
  - Density: 30.5/sq mi (11.78/km^{2})
- Time zone: UTC-6 (Central (CST))
  - Summer (DST): UTC-5 (CDT)
- Area code: 225
- GNIS feature ID: 1628069

Romeville is an unincorporated community and census-designated place in St. James Parish, Louisiana, United States. Located on the east bank of the Mississippi River along Louisiana Highway 44, it lies within Louisiana’s River Parishes region. Romeville first appeared as a census-designated place in the 2010 United States Census, when its population was 130; by 2020, the population had declined to 99.

== History ==
Romeville is part of the historic Acadian Coast in St. James Parish, Louisiana, an area settled by French-speaking Acadians after their expulsion from Nova Scotia in the mid-18th century. These settlers arrived between 1756 and 1765, establishing small farms along the east bank of the Mississippi River and contributing to the region’s strong Creole and Cajun cultural heritage.

The parish was created in 1807 as one of the original nineteen parishes of the Territory of Orleans, and Romeville developed as part of the rural plantation economy that dominated the lower Mississippi Valley during the 19th century. Sugarcane became the primary crop in the region after Etienne de Boré successfully granulated sugar in 1795, sparking a boom in sugar production that shaped the economy and landscape of St. James Parish for generations.

Romeville’s name likely reflects French and Spanish colonial naming traditions common in Louisiana, though its exact origin is unclear. The community remained small and agricultural throughout the antebellum period, with large plantations lining the river and enslaved labor forming the backbone of sugar production until the American Civil War.

A post office operated in the area under the name Colomb beginning in 1889, later renamed Romeville before its discontinuation in 1915. Early post offices were often located inside plantation commissaries, serving as hubs for rural residents. By the early 20th century, Romeville remained a small settlement with limited commercial development, and it was first recognized as a census-designated place in the 2010 United States Census.

== Geography ==
Romeville is located on the east bank of the Mississippi River in St. James Parish, Louisiana, at approximately 30°03′45″N 90°50′48″W and an elevation of about 23 feet (7.0 m). According to the U.S. Census Bureau, the CDP has a total area of 3.56 square miles (9.2 km^{2}), of which 3.25 square miles (8.4 km^{2}) is land and 0.32 square miles (0.83 km^{2}) is water. The community lies within the Mississippi River alluvial plain, characterized by flat terrain and fertile soils.

== Demographics ==
Romeville first appeared as a census-designated place in the 2010 United States census.

Historical population
Census	Pop.	Note	%±
2010	130		—
2020	99		−23.8%
U.S. Decennial Census

Romeville CDP, Louisiana – Racial and ethnic composition Note: the U.S. census treats Hispanic/Latino as an ethnic category. This table excludes Latinos from the racial categories and assigns them to a separate category. Hispanics/Latinos may be of any race.
Race / Ethnicity (NH = Non-Hispanic)	Pop 2010	Pop 2020	% 2010	% 2020
White alone (NH)	21	18	16.15%	18.18%
Black or African American alone (NH)	109	74	83.85%	74.75%
Native American or Alaska Native alone (NH)	0	2	0.00%	2.02%
Asian alone (NH)	0	0	0.00%	0.00%
Native Hawaiian or Pacific Islander alone (NH)	0	0	0.00%	0.00%
Other race alone (NH)	0	0	0.00%	0.00%
Mixed race or Multiracial (NH)	0	4	0.00%	4.04%
Hispanic or Latino (any race)	0	1	0.00%	1.01%
Total	130	99	100.00%	100.00%

Its population was 130 in 2010 and 99 in 2020.

== Economy ==
Romeville’s economy is primarily based on agriculture, with sugarcane as the dominant crop in St. James Parish, Louisiana. Sugarcane is grown on approximately 26,000 acres parish-wide and contributes more than $34 million annually to the local economy. Other crops include soybeans and the specialty tobacco known as perique tobacco, which is unique to the region.

The community lies within Louisiana’s industrial corridor, often called Cancer Alley, an 85-mile stretch along the Mississippi River between Baton Rouge and New Orleans that hosts numerous petrochemical plants and refineries. These facilities provide employment opportunities but have also raised concerns about environmental health and safety.

Romeville itself has few commercial establishments, limited to small grocery, hardware, and automotive shops, and most residents commute to nearby towns for work. Economic indicators show significant challenges: the median household income is about $33,125, unemployment exceeds 30%, and more than half of residents live below the poverty line.

== Education ==
Romeville is served by St. James Parish Public Schools, which operates six public schools in the parish. The district ranks among the top 20% of Louisiana school systems and reports a graduation rate of 92%.

Historically, Romeville was home to Romeville Elementary School, located in Convent, Louisiana. The school served grades PK–6 and had 119 students and 13 teachers during its final years, with a student–teacher ratio of 9:1. Minority enrollment was 99% African American. The school closed in 2012 due to declining enrollment and population shifts toward industrial development, and its students were reassigned primarily to Paulina Elementary School and later transitioned to Lutcher High School.

Today, Romeville students attend schools in nearby communities, including:

- Paulina Elementary School (PK–3)
- Lutcher High School (grades 7–12)
- St. James High School (grades 7–12)

== Transportation ==
Romeville is located along Louisiana Highway 44, which parallels the east bank of the Mississippi River and connects communities between Prairieville and LaPlace. The nearest major interstate is Interstate 10, accessible via Gonzales, about 15 miles northwest.

The closest major airports are Louis Armstrong New Orleans International Airport (MSY) and Baton Rouge Metropolitan Airport (BTR), each roughly 44 miles away. The community is also near the Port of South Louisiana, one of the largest tonnage ports in the Western Hemisphere.

== Culture ==
Romeville’s culture reflects its rural character and close-knit community traditions. Social life historically centered around family gatherings, church activities, and seasonal events tied to agriculture, particularly sugarcane harvests. Residents maintain culinary traditions common to the River Parishes, with home-prepared dishes such as gumbo, jambalaya, and crawfish boils often featured at community and family celebrations.

Religious life plays a significant role in Romeville’s cultural identity. The community is predominantly Roman Catholic, and local church events have historically served as focal points for social interaction and charitable activities. While Romeville does not host major festivals, residents often participate in parish-wide traditions and maintain strong ties to Creole and Cajun heritage through language, music, and foodways passed down through generations.

== Landmarks ==
Romeville contains a small community park, Romeville Park, which offers a playground, walking track, and ball fields. The historic Pleasant Hill Cemetery and adjacent Baptist church are located at the intersection of Louisiana Highway 44 and Pleasant Hill Street.

Several notable landmarks are located nearby along the Mississippi River corridor, including:

- Laura Plantation, a Creole heritage site offering guided tours.
- Evergreen Plantation, known for its preserved slave quarters and appearances in films.
- St. Joseph Plantation, a historic sugar plantation.
- Veterans Memorial Bridge, a major crossing over the Mississippi River.

A historical marker commemorating the former Romeville Post Office (1889–1915) is displayed at the LSU Rural Life Museum in Baton Rouge.

== Infrastructure and environment ==
Romeville does not operate its own utility systems; water, sewer, and drainage services are managed by St. James Parish. Electricity is provided by Entergy Louisiana and Cleco Power, regulated by the Louisiana Public Service Commission. The community has limited broadband access, though parish-wide improvements are underway through state and federal programs.

Romeville lies within Louisiana’s industrial corridor known as Cancer Alley, and nearby petrochemical facilities have raised concerns about air quality and environmental health. The community also faces flood risk due to its proximity to the Mississippi River. While levees provide protection, Romeville is vulnerable to heavy rainfall and storm surge during hurricanes.
