= Daniel Blank =

Convicted serial killer on death row in Louisiana (born 1962)

Daniel Joseph Blank
- 1997 booking photo of Daniel Blank
- Born: June 28, 1962 (age 64); Paulina, Louisiana, U.S.
- Other name: The River Parishes serial killer
- Status: Incarcerated on death row in Louisiana
- Motive: Robbery
- Conviction: First-degree murder (x5)
- Penalty: 1999; Death; 2000–2001; Life imprisonment without parole (x4)

Details
- Victims: 6 murdered, 2 survived
- Date: 1996 – 1997
- Country: United States
- Locations: River Parishes, Louisiana
- Imprisoned at: Louisiana State Penitentiary

Daniel Joseph Blank (born June 28, 1962) is an American convicted serial killer sentenced to death in Louisiana. Dubbed The River Parishes serial killer, Blank had killed a total of six elderly people between 1996 and 1997 within the perimeters of River Parishes in Louisiana. Blank was found guilty of the April 10, 1997 murder of 71-year-old Lillian Philippe, and sentenced to death on December 9, 1999. Blank was also given multiple life sentences for the other cases that were taken to trial, including one for the May 14, 1997 murder of 55-year-old Joan Brock, which had originally been a death sentence but was later commuted to life. Blank remains incarcerated on death row as of 2025.

== Murders ==
Daniel Joseph Blank, who was a mechanic residing in Louisiana, committed a total of six murders between October 1996 and May 1997 in River Parishes, Louisiana. According to the police, Blank had committed these murders in the course of robberies to finance his gambling habit.

Victor Rossi

On October 27, 1996, Blank murdered his employer, 41-year-old Victor Rossi, at his home in St. Amant. Based on sources, prior to his murder, Rossi has hired Blank as his new employee of his auto repair shop in Prairieville. Blank had killed Rossi while robbing him for money.

Barbara Bourgeois

On the night of March 18, 1997, Blank entered the home of 58-year-old Barbara Bourgeois in Paulina, for the purpose of committing robbery. Blank disabled the telephone wires at her residence and ransacked the house for money when Bourgeois woke up from her sleep and confronted Blank. Upon being caught red-handed, Blank armed himself with a vacuum cleaner and hit her repeatedly in the head and body, and as a result of the attack, Bourgeois suffered from multiple injuries, consisting of large hematomas, mass blunt trauma to the face, fractured nasal bones, a fractured sternum and hemorrhage which caused her death.

Lillian Philippe

On April 9, 1997, Blank invaded the house of 71-year-old Lillian Philippe in Gonzales, and while he was ransacking the house, Blank came face to face with Philippe, who saw Blank after coming out of the bathroom. Blank assaulted and stabbed Philippe to death during the confrontation, and escaped after he stole from her house. Philippe's body was discovered the next day by her sister-in-law.

Sam Arcuri and Louella Arcuri

On May 9, 1997, Blank targeted an elderly couple, 76-year-old Sam Arcuri and his 69-year-old wife Louella Arcuri, and subsequently robbed and murdered them by bludgeoning inside their home at LaPlace.

Joan Brock

On May 14, 1997, 55-year-old Joan Brock became Blank's sixth and final murder victim. Brock was the wife of Blank's former employer, and at her home in LaPlace, Blank had robbed Brock before he fatally assaulted her in her backyard.

Apart from the six murders, Blank also attempted to kill a couple, Leonce and Joyce Millet (both aged 66), on July 7, 1997. The couple were shot outside their home in Gonzales but survived the shooting.

== Murder trials ==
=== Charges and pre-trial updates ===
Five months after the murder of Joan Brock, on November 14, 1997, Daniel Blank was arrested in Onalaska, Texas, where he opened a mechanic's shop in August 1997. Upon his arrest, Blank gradually confessed to all the murders he committed. Authorities reportedly expressed their intent to seek the death penalty for Blank.

Prior to December 9, 1997, Blank was first indicted for three counts of first-degree murder pertaining to the deaths of Brock and the Arcuris. On December 12, 1997, Blank was indicted on two more counts of first-degree murder for the deaths of Victor Rossi and Lillian Philippe, bringing the total murder indictment to five. By January 1998, Blank was indicted on all six counts of first-degree murder for the serial killings and two counts of attempted murder for the shooting of the Millets, but he pleaded innocent to all charges.

Before his trial process could be expedited, a court order was issued in April 1998 to keep the evidence confidential from the public to avoid publicity from affecting Blank's right to a fair trial.

In December 1998, during his court appearance, Blank attempted to escape from the courtroom but was ultimately caught by the police.

=== 1999 ===
Daniel Blank first stood trial for the murder of Lillian Philippe.

The trial of Blank began on July 21, 1999, with an Ascension Parish jury presiding the case. Despite his confession, Blank claimed he was innocent and his lawyers argued that the taped confession, which was about 12 hours long, was being made under coercion and that he did not understand his rights. However, detectives refuted the defence's contention and stated that Blank had voluntarily confessed to the murders of Philippe and five others.

On September 3, 1999, the jury found Blank guilty of murdering Philippe in the first degree, after about 2 1/2 hours of deliberation.

On September 4, 1999, the jury returned with their verdict on sentence, unanimously recommending the death penalty for Blank.

On December 9, 1999, State District Judge John L. Peytavin formally sentenced 37-year-old Daniel Blank to death for the murder of Lillian Philippe.

=== 2000 ===
After his sentencing for the murder of Philippe, Blank's second murder trial for the death of Joan Brock commenced in 2000.

On April 8, 2000, a second jury found Blank guilty of the first-degree murder of Brock despite his claims of innocence. Likewise, the prosecution sought the death penalty for Blank.

On October 20, 2000, 40th District Judge J. Sterling Snowdy sentenced Blank to death for murdering Brock, marking the second time Blank was sentenced to death. Snowdy cited that the death of Brock caused irreparable damage to the Brock family, the local community and the state.

=== 2001 ===
On February 7, 2001, a day after his third murder trial for the second-degree murder of Barbara Bourgeois began, Blank, who initially pleaded innocent to Bourgeois's killing, changed his plea to guilty. As a result of this plea of guilt, Blank was sentenced to life imprisonment without the possibility of parole by Judge Alvin Turner.

In October 2001, Blank expressed his intention to plead guilty to two more counts of first-degree murder for the deaths of Sam and Louella Arcuri. On November 14, 2001, Blank pleaded guilty in a fourth trial to two counts of first-degree murder for the double murder of the Arcuris. State District Judge J. Sterling Snowdy sentenced Blank to two additional terms of life without parole for the Arcuri murders, thus sparing Blank the possibility of more death sentences.

After his fourth trial, however, Blank was not tried for the sixth charge of first-degree murder pertaining to the death of Victor Rossi.

== Appeal process ==
On November 27, 2001, the 5th Circuit Court of Appeal of Louisiana rejected Daniel Blank's appeal against his conviction for the murder of Barbara Bourgeois. Blank argued in that appeal that he was innocent and his confession was coerced, but his arguments were all thrown out.

In 2006, Blank's conviction and death sentence for the murder of Joan Brock were vacated in favour of a new trial, after a clerical error was discovered to be made during the trial procedure of that case. Three years later, in July 2009, Blank decided to plead guilty to avoid a new trial, and as a result, Blank was re-sentenced to a fourth life term without parole, although his death sentence for the murder of Lillian Philippe still remains.

On April 11, 2007, the Louisiana Supreme Court dismissed Blank's appeal against his conviction and death sentence for the murder of Lillian Philippe.

On January 25, 2011, the 5th Circuit Court of Appeal of Louisiana rejected Blank's appeal against his conviction for murdering Brock.

In July 2015, Blank filed another appeal to challenge his conviction for Philippe's murder and maintained he was innocent. On September 30, 2015, State District Judge Jessie LeBlanc rejected Blank's appeal, after finding no merit in the claims of innocence submitted by Blank's lawyers and adopted the view that Blank's "detailed" confession was something only the real killer would provide.

On May 13, 2016, the Louisiana Supreme Court dismissed Blank's second appeal against his death sentence and conviction for Philippe's murder.

On October 5, 2021, U.S. District Judge Brian A. Jackson approved Blank's petition for new DNA testing of the forensic evidence behind the murders. However, the DNA testing procedure was delayed for two years as an expert witness for the defence had died, compounded by the authorities seeking agreement from Blank to not sue the state should he potentially be exonerated, and while Blank agreed not to do so, Jackson issued another court order in December 2023 for the authorities to comply with his original judgement. The testing procedures were completed in January 2024, but a review is currently ongoing.

== Execution stay and current status ==
After his death sentencing in 1999, Daniel Blank was incarcerated on death row at the Louisiana State Penitentiary while pending his appeals against the death sentence for murdering Lillian Philippe.

On January 20, 2016, State District Judge Jessie LeBlanc signed the death warrant of Daniel Blank, scheduling his death sentence to be carried out on March 14, 2016. Despite the approval of Blank's execution date, it was widely speculated that Blank would not be executed, given that the state was experiencing a shortage of lethal injection drugs required to carry out death sentences in the state, and the possibility of more appeals. Ultimately, on February 17, 2016, the Louisiana Supreme Court issued a stay of execution for Blank.

In 2023, Louisiana Governor John Bel Edwards, nearing the end of his term, publicly expressed his opposition to the death penalty and called for its abolition in the state. However, on May 24, 2023, the Louisiana legislature voted against a bill that would have ended capital punishment in the state. In June 2023, a month later, all but one of the 56 death row inmates in Louisiana, including Blank, filed clemency petitions in hopes of having their death sentences commuted to life imprisonment by Edwards before the end of his term. These petitions were reviewed by the Louisiana Board of Pardons and Committee on Parole.

However, in July 2023, the Board rejected all 56 clemency petitions, ruling that the inmates were ineligible due to the timing of their filings, as they had submitted their petitions too soon after recent judicial rulings on appeals (clemency petitions could only be filed at least one year after the final appeal ruling). In October 2023, the Board also denied further clemency requests from five death row inmates, including Antoinette Frank.

Two years after Blank's clemency bid, in February 2025, the state of Louisiana announced its plans to revive executions after a 15-year moratorium on executions since 2010. A month after the announcement, convicted rapist-killer Jessie Hoffman Jr. was put to death by nitrogen hypoxia on March 18, 2025, thus ending the moratorium. As of March 17, 2025, the eve of Hoffman's execution, Blank was one of 56 inmates to remain on Louisiana's death row; the number fell to 55 after Hoffman's death sentence was carried out.

As of 2025, Daniel Joseph Blank remains on death row at the Louisiana State Penitentiary.

== See also ==
- Capital punishment in Louisiana
- List of death row inmates in the United States § Louisiana
- List of serial killers in the United States
- List of people sentenced to more than one life imprisonment
