= Grand Point, Louisiana =

- Unincorporated community
- Location within Louisiana Location within the United States
- Coordinates: 30°03′41″N 90°45′12″W
- Country: United States
- State: Louisiana
- Parish: St. James

Area
  - Total: 4.57 sq mi (11.83 km^{2})
  - Land: 4.29 sq mi (11.12 km^{2})
  - Water: 0.27 sq mi (0.71 km^{2})
- Elevation: 7 ft (2.1 m)

Population (2020)
  - Total: 2,241
  - Density: 522.0/sq mi (201.54/km^{2})
- Time zone: UTC-6 (Central (CST))
  - Summer (DST): UTC-5 (CDT)
- Area code: 225
- GNIS feature ID: 560881

Grand Point is an unincorporated community and census-designated place (CDP) in St. James Parish, Louisiana, United States. Located in the River Parishes region along the east bank of the Mississippi River, it is part of the Baton Rouge metropolitan area. The community first appeared as a CDP in the 2010 United States Census, when it recorded a population of 2,473; by the 2020 United States Census, the population had declined to 2,241.

== History ==
Grand Point’s origins are closely tied to the agricultural and cultural development of Louisiana’s River Parishes. The area was historically part of the Acadian Coast, settled by French-speaking Acadians after 1765 following their expulsion from Nova Scotia. These settlers established farms along the Mississippi River and contributed to the region’s strong Roman Catholic heritage, which shaped local institutions and traditions. St. James Parish itself was created in 1807 as one of the original nineteen parishes of the Territory of Orleans, and its population largely consisted of Acadian descendants and French Creoles.

Grand Point developed as a small rural community centered on farming and local commerce. In the late 18th century, the area became notable for perique tobacco, a rare variety originally cultivated by Choctaw and Chickasaw peoples using a unique pressure-curing process. French settler Pierre Chenet learned this technique in the 1790s and helped popularize perique, which remains produced in the region to this day. Grand Point, along with nearby Garyville and Paulina, became one of the primary sites for perique farming, a distinction that continues as part of its cultural identity.

By the late 19th century, Grand Point had grown into a modest but vibrant settlement with stores, bars, schools, and its own Catholic chapel. Michel Martin donated land for St. Vincent de Paul Chapel in 1874, which later became St. Philomena de las Grande Pointe Catholic Chapel after reconstruction in 1911. The chapel served the community until 1929, reflecting the importance of local religious life in an era when travel to larger towns was difficult. A private Catholic school operated alongside the chapel, further underscoring the community’s educational and spiritual priorities.

Although Grand Point never incorporated as a municipality, its identity as a farming community persisted through the 20th century. Historic maps from the United States Geological Survey show gradual changes in land use and infrastructure from the late 1800s onward, but the area retained its rural character. Today, Grand Point is recognized as a Census-designated place, first appearing in the 2010 United States Census.

== Geography ==
Grand Point is situated in the River Parishes region of southeastern Louisiana, along the east bank of the Mississippi River. It lies at 30°03′41″N 90°45′12″W, approximately midway between the communities of Paulina and Gramercy. The area is part of the low-lying Mississippi River Delta, characterized by fertile alluvial soils and a network of natural levees and bayous.

According to the United States Census Bureau, Grand Point encompasses a total area of 4.57 square miles (11.8 km^{2}), of which 4.25 square miles (11.0 km^{2}) is land and 0.32 square miles (0.83 km^{2}) (about 7%) is water. The community sits at an elevation of roughly 7 feet (2.1 m) above sea level, making it vulnerable to flooding during high river stages and tropical weather events.

== Demographics ==
According to the United States Census Bureau, Grand Point first appeared as a census-designated place in the 2010 United States census.

The population was 2,473 in 2010 and declined to 2,241 by 2020.

Historical population
Census	Pop.	Note	%±
2010	2,473		—
2020	2,241		−9.4%
U.S. Decennial Census

=== Racial and ethnic composition ===
The U.S. Census Bureau treats Hispanic/Latino as an ethnic category; Hispanics/Latinos may be of any race.

Grand Point CDP, Louisiana – Racial and ethnic composition
Race / Ethnicity	2010	2020
White (non-Hispanic)	1,813 (73.3%)	1,703 (76.0%)
Black or African American (non-Hispanic)	640 (25.9%)	468 (20.9%)
Native American or Alaska Native	3 (0.1%)	3 (0.1%)
Asian	0 (0.0%)	2 (0.1%)
Native Hawaiian or Pacific Islander	3 (0.1%)	0 (0.0%)
Two or more races	5 (0.2%)	34 (1.5%)
Hispanic or Latino (any race)	8 (0.3%)	31 (1.4%)
Total	2,473	2,241
