= Cory Geason =

American football player (born 1975)

No. 85, 88
- Position: Tight end

Personal information
- Born: August 12, 1975 (age 51); Saint James Parish, Louisiana, U.S.
- Listed height: 6 ft 4 in (1.93 m)
- Listed weight: 270 lb (122 kg)

Career information
- High school: St. James (LA)
- College: Tulane
- NFL draft: 1998: undrafted

Career history
- Dallas Cowboys (1998)*; Amsterdam Admirals (1999); Tampa Bay Buccaneers (1999)*; Pittsburgh Steelers (1999–2001); Buffalo Bills (2002); Green Bay Packers (2003)*
- * Offseason or practice squad member only
- Stats at Pro Football Reference

Cory E. Geason (born August 12, 1975, in Louisiana) is an American former professional football player in the NFL. He played college football for the Tulane Green Wave.

== Playing career ==
=== College career ===
Geason played collegiately at Tulane University.

=== Professional career ===
Geason played tight end in the NFL with the Pittsburgh Steelers from 2000 to 2001 and with the Buffalo Bills in 2002. Geason caught three passes with the Steelers for 66 yards.
