= Dexter McCoil =

American gridiron football player and coach (born 1991)

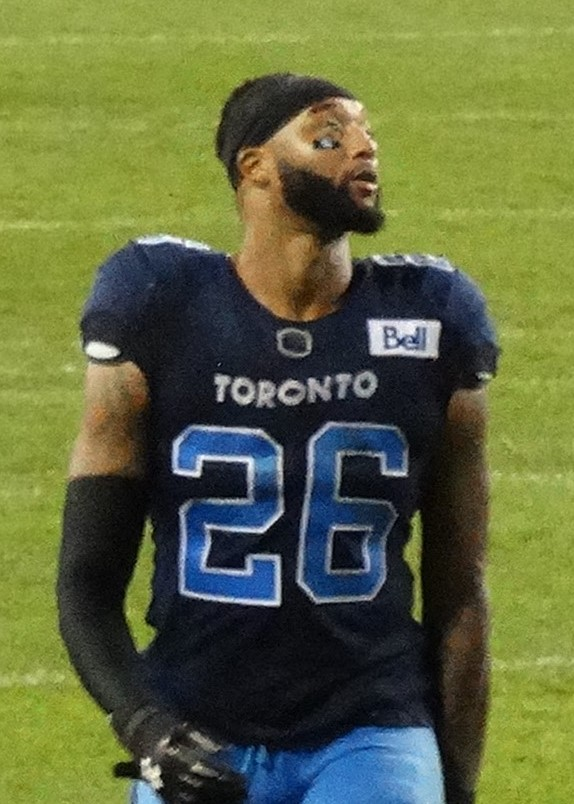
- McCoil with the Toronto Argonauts in 2021

Louisiana Tech Bulldogs
- Title: Safeties coach

Personal information
- Born: September 5, 1991 (age 35); Metairie, Louisiana, U.S.
- Listed height: 6 ft 4 in (1.93 m)
- Listed weight: 220 lb (100 kg)

Career information
- Positions: Safety, linebacker (No. 45, 23, 27, 26)
- High school: Lutcher (Lutcher, Louisiana)
- College: Tulsa
- NFL draft: 2013: undrafted

Career history

Playing
- Los Angeles Kiss (2014); Edmonton Eskimos (2014–2015); San Diego / Los Angeles Chargers (2016–2017); San Francisco 49ers (2017–2018); Los Angeles Chargers (2018)*; Calgary Stampeders (2019); St. Louis BattleHawks (2020); Toronto Argonauts (2021)
- * Offseason or practice squad member only

Coaching
- Incarnate Word (2022) Safeties coach; Texas State (2023) Safeties coach; Texas State (2024–2025) Defensive coordinator; Louisiana Tech (2026–present) Safeties coach

Awards and highlights
- Grey Cup champion (2015); CFL All-Star (2014); 2× CFL West All-Star (2014, 2015); Jackie Parker Trophy (2014); CFL's Most Outstanding Rookie Award (2014); First-team All-C-USA (2012); Second-team All-C-USA (2011)

Career NFL statistics
- Total tackles: 30
- Pass deflections: 5
- Interceptions: 1
- Stats at Pro Football Reference

Career CFL statistics
- Tackles: 136
- Sacks: 6
- Interceptions: 10
- Special teams tackles: 20
- Stats at CFL.ca

Career AFL statistics
- Total tackles: 13
- Sacks: 0.5
- Interceptions: 1
- Stats at ArenaFan.com

Dexter McCoil Sr. (born September 5, 1991) is an American college football coach and former safety, who was most recently the defensive coordinator for the Texas State Bobcats. He played college football at Tulsa. McCoil played professionally for the Los Angeles Kiss, Edmonton Eskimos, Los Angeles Chargers, San Francisco 49ers, Calgary Stampeders, St. Louis BattleHawks, and Toronto Argonauts.

== Early life ==
McCoil attended Lutcher High School in Lutcher, Louisiana, where he helped lead the Bulldogs to the 2008 3A State Championship. He was ranked as the 58th top prospect in the state of Louisiana by Rivals.com. He was named the District MVP following his senior season. He was an honorable mention all-state in his senior season. McCoil also earned the all-district, all-metro and all-River Parish honors following both his junior and senior seasons of high school.

College recruiting
Name	Hometown	School	Height	Weight	40^{‡}	Commit date
Dexter McCoil; Safety	Lutcher, Louisiana	Lutcher High School	6 ft 4 in (1.93 m)	168 lb (76 kg)	4.6 (According to scout.com)	Jan 20, 2009
Dexter McCoil; Safety	Recruit ratings: Scout: Rivals:					
Overall recruit ranking: Scout: 97 (WLB) Rivals: NR (S), NR (National), 58 (Louisiana)
‡ Refers to 40-yard dash; Note: In many cases, Scout, Rivals, 247Sports, On3, and ESPN may conflict in their listings of height, weight and 40 time.; In these cases, the average was taken. ESPN grades are on a 100-point scale.; Sources: "2009 Tulsa Football Commitments". Rivals.; "2009 Tulsa Football Recruiting Commits". Scout.; "Scout.com Team Recruiting Rankings". Scout.; "2009 Team Ranking". Rivals.com.

== College career ==
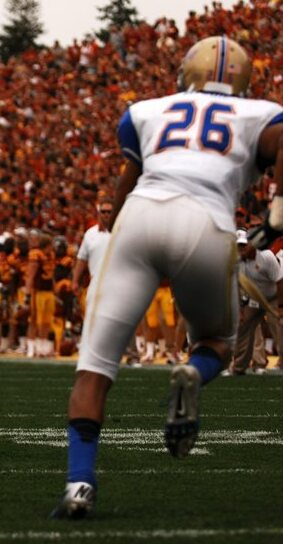
McCoil with Tulsa in 2012

McCoil was named the Defensive MVP following his performance in the 2011 Bell Helicopter Armed Forces Bowl. He also earned second-team all-Conference USA honors following his junior season. Prior to his senior season, he was selected on the Bronko Nagurski Trophy Watch List and also selected on the Jim Thorpe Award Watch List. In his four seasons at Tulsa, he finished with a total of 315 tackles, 18 Interceptions, 43 passes defensed, and one forced fumble.

== Professional career ==
McCoil went undrafted following the conclusion of the 2013 NFL draft. McCoil attended the Oakland Raiders rookie minicamp but failed to make the final cut on the preseason 90 man roster.

=== Los Angeles Kiss ===
On February 17, 2014, McCoil was assigned to the Los Angeles Kiss of the Arena Football League (AFL). In 5 games for the Kiss, McCoil managed several splash plays, including half a sack, and an interception returned 14 yards for a touchdown.

=== Edmonton Eskimos ===
On May 31, 2014, McCoil signed with the Edmonton Eskimos of the Canadian Football League. He won the CFL's Most Outstanding Rookie Award in 2014 for recording 67 tackles, four sacks and tying for the league lead with six interceptions. McCoil and the Eskimos had a contract dispute during the 2015 CFL season as he claimed that he was not offered the one-year contract (with a player option to extend to two years), rather he claimed the Eskimos only offered him the minimum two-year contract. On the field McCoil continued to be a key cog in the Eskimos defense recording 76 defensive tackles, two sacks, three interceptions and a fumble recovery. On December 6, 2015, after winning the 103rd Grey Cup to close the season, the Eskimos announced they had reached a settlement of all outstanding matters with Dexter McCoil, the CFL and the CFLPA. Starting on May 1, 2016, McCoil was free to attempt to sign with an NFL team. In the event that McCoil was unsuccessful in securing an NFL standard player contract for the 2016 NFL season, he entered into an agreement to play for the Eskimos for the 2016 and 2017 CFL seasons.

=== San Diego / Los Angeles Chargers ===
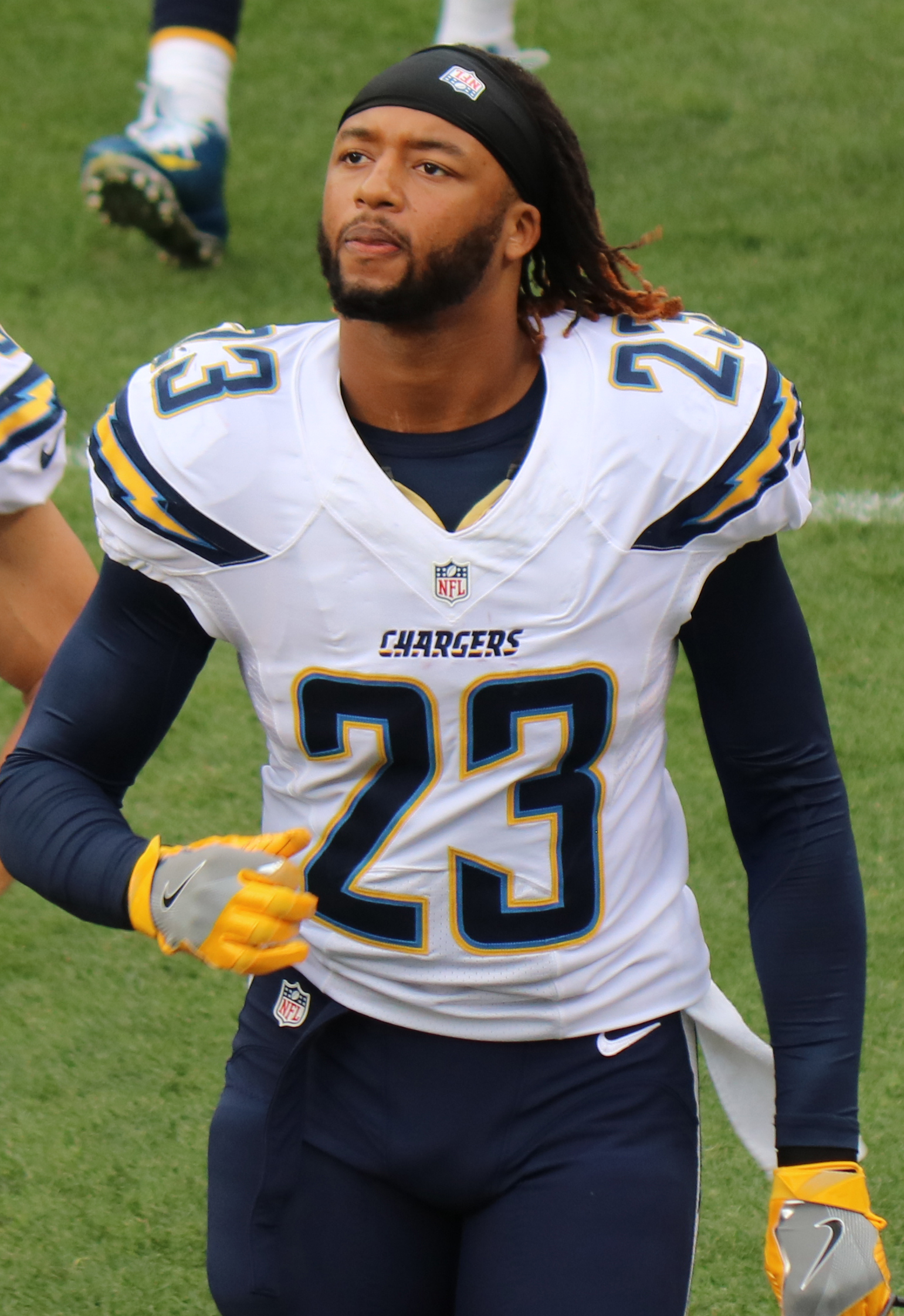
McCoil with the Chargers in 2016.

On January 12, 2016, McCoil signed with the San Diego Chargers. The Chargers tried him out at linebacker and at safety during their off-season workouts. On September 3, McCoil was listed on the Chargers' final 53-man roster. McCoil made his first start at safety for the Chargers on September 25, against the Indianapolis Colts. He played in all 16 games with two starts, recording 25 tackles, five passes defensed and one interception. On October 7, 2017, McCoil was waived by the Chargers.

=== San Francisco 49ers ===
On October 9, 2017, McCoil was claimed off waivers by the San Francisco 49ers.

McCoil was released by San Francisco on April 30, 2018. He was re-signed by the 49ers on August 17. McCoil was waived again as a part of final roster cuts on September 1. He was re-signed again to the team's practice squad on September 27. McCoil was released once more on October 9.

=== Los Angeles Chargers (second stint) ===
On January 2, 2019, McCoil was signed to the Los Angeles Chargers' practice squad.

=== Calgary Stampeders ===
On October 22, 2019 McCoil returned to the CFL, signing with the Calgary Stampeders near the end of the 2019 regular season. In two games played, McCoil managed two tackles on defense, three more on special teams, and an interception. Following Calgary's playoff defeat, during which McCoil put up four more defensive tackles and two more special teams stops, he was cut on November 25.

=== St. Louis BattleHawks ===
On October 16, 2019, several days prior to signing with the Stampeders, McCoil was drafted by the St. Louis BattleHawks in the fourth round of the defensive backs phase of the 2020 XFL draft. In 5 games played, McCoil finished tied for 3rd in the league in tackles (alongside several other players including teammate Terence Garvin) with 36, in addition to a quarterback sack. He had his contract terminated when the league suspended operations on April 10, 2020.

=== Toronto Argonauts ===
On June 28, 2021, McCoil signed with the Toronto Argonauts of the Canadian Football League.

== Personal life ==
His second cousin is former cornerback Corey Webster.
