= Moonshine, Louisiana =

- Unincorporated community and Census-designated place
- Interactive map of Moonshine, Louisiana
- Coordinates: 29°58′12″N 90°48′47″W
- Country: United States
- State: Louisiana
- Parish: St. James

Area
  - Total: 0.43 sq mi (1.1 km^{2})
  - Land: 0.36 sq mi (0.93 km^{2})
  - Water: 0.07 sq mi (0.18 km^{2})
- Elevation: 7 ft (2.1 m)

Population (2020)
  - Total: 168
  - Density: 461.54/sq mi (178.20/km^{2})
- Time zone: UTC-6 (Central (CST))
  - Summer (DST): UTC-5 (CDT)
- Area code: 225
- GNIS feature ID: 2583540

Moonshine is an unincorporated community and Census-designated place in St. James Parish, Louisiana, United States. It is located on the west bank of the Mississippi River, approximately 40 miles west of New Orleans and 35 miles southeast of Baton Rouge. The community was first listed as a CDP in the 2010 census with a population of 194; by 2020, the population declined to 168.

== History ==
Moonshine lies within the historic region known as the Second Acadian Coast, settled by French-speaking Acadians in the mid-18th century after their expulsion from Canada. These settlers established small farming communities along the Mississippi River, cultivating crops such as sugarcane and corn.

St. James Parish, where Moonshine is located, was created in 1807 as one of Louisiana’s original parishes. The area developed around plantation agriculture during the antebellum period, with sugar production becoming the dominant economic activity. Many plantations operated along the river near present-day Moonshine, supported by enslaved labor until the Civil War.

The name "Moonshine" appears on historical maps as a locale rather than a formal town, suggesting it originated as a descriptive name for a landing or settlement along the river. While the exact origin of the name is unclear, local historians note that many river communities adopted colorful names tied to natural features or colloquial expressions.

== Geography ==
Moonshine occupies 0.43 square miles (1.1 km^{2}), of which 0.36 square miles (0.93 km^{2}) is land and 0.07 square miles (0.18 km^{2}) is water. It sits at an elevation of approximately 7 feet above sea level, making it part of Louisiana’s Mississippi Alluvial Plain. The community is vulnerable to flooding during high river stages and relies on levee protection systems maintained along the Mississippi River.

== Demographics ==
According to the 2020 census, Moonshine had 168 residents, down from 194 in 2010. The population is predominantly Black or African American (85.71%), followed by White (4.76%), multiracial individuals (5.95%), and Hispanic or Latino (3.57%).

== Economy ==
Moonshine is primarily residential, with limited commercial activity. Historically, the economy of St. James Parish centered on sugarcane plantations and later on petrochemical industries along the Mississippi River corridor. Today, many residents commute to jobs in nearby industrial plants or service sectors in Baton Rouge and New Orleans.

== Culture ==
The community reflects the cultural heritage of the River Parishes, known for their French Creole traditions, Catholic churches, and annual festivals celebrating local food and music. St. James Parish hosts events such as the Bonfires on the Levee during Christmas Eve, a tradition dating back to the 19th century.

== See also ==
- St. James Parish, Louisiana
- Mississippi River
- Acadian Coast
