= St. James, Louisiana =

- Census-designated place
- Location within Louisiana
- Coordinates: 29°58′55″N 90°49′54″W
- Country: United States
- State: Louisiana
- Parish: St. James

Area
  - Total: 9.89 sq mi (25.61 km^{2})
  - Land: 8.39 sq mi (21.72 km^{2})
  - Water: 1.50 sq mi (3.88 km^{2})
- Elevation: 16 ft (5 m)

Population (2020)
  - Total: 592
  - Density: 70.6/sq mi (27.25/km^{2})
- Time zone: UTC-6 (Central (CST))
  - Summer (DST): UTC-5 (CDT)
- ZIP code: 70086
- Area code: 225
- GNIS feature ID: 1628114

St. James is a census-designated place in St. James Parish, Louisiana, United States on the west bank of the Mississippi River. It is part of the New Orleans metropolitan area. As of the 2020 census, St. James had a population of 592.

== Education ==
St. James Parish Public Schools operates public schools:

- St. Louis Academy (PreK-3)

== Demographics ==
Historical population
Census	Pop.	Note	%±
2010	828		—
2020	592		−28.5%
U.S. Decennial Census

St. James first appeared as a census designated place in the 2010 U.S. census.

St. James CDP, Louisiana – Racial and ethnic composition Note: the US Census treats Hispanic/Latino as an ethnic category. This table excludes Latinos from the racial categories and assigns them to a separate category. Hispanics/Latinos may be of any race.
Race / Ethnicity (NH = Non-Hispanic)	Pop 2010	Pop 2020	% 2010	% 2020
White alone (NH)	138	62	16.67%	10.47%
Black or African American alone (NH)	662	507	79.95%	85.64%
Native American or Alaska Native alone (NH)	0	0	0.00%	0.00%
Asian alone (NH)	0	0	0.00%	0.00%
Native Hawaiian or Pacific Islander alone (NH)	0	0	0.00%	0.00%
Other race alone (NH)	0	0	0.00%	0.00%
Mixed race or Multiracial (NH)	1	5	0.12%	0.84%
Hispanic or Latino (any race)	27	18	3.26%	3.04%
Total	828	592	100.00%	100.00%

In 2010, its population was 828. By 2020, its population declined to 592.
