= Acadiana Profile =

US magazine

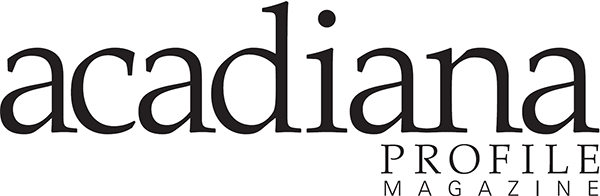

- Cover for the April/May 2021 issue
- Categories: Regional magazine
- Frequency: Bimonthly
- Founder: Robert Angers and Geraldine Angers
- Founded: 1968
- Company: Renaissance Publishing
- Country: United States
- Based in: Lafayette, Louisiana
- Language: English, French
- Website: www.acadianaprofile.com
- ISSN: 0001-4397

Acadiana Profile is a bi-monthly magazine published in the American state of Louisiana. It is the longest-running magazine in the state's history, and one of the most enduring regional publications in the United States. Subtitled "The Magazine of the Cajun Country", Acadiana Profile is published in Lafayette six times annually.

The publication was founded in 1968 by veteran newspaperman and businessman Robert Angers (1919-1988) of Lafayette, and his wife, the former Geraldine Beaulieu (born 1921). It is a general-interest magazine which circulates in the 22-parish section of South Louisiana known as Acadiana.

In 1985 Trent Michael Angers, son of the founders, assumed operation of the magazine. Renaissance Publishing acquired the magazine in 2011.

The magazine includes sections on Cajun cuisine, tourism, history, culture and humor. A recent article entitled "Trapped by Hurricane Audrey" recalls the 1957 storm that had been one of the worst to hit the Louisiana Gulf Coast prior to Katrina.
