= St. James High School (Louisiana) =

High school in Vacherie, Louisiana

Location
- 22187 Hwy. 20; Vacherie, Louisiana 70090; United States; 29°57′49″N 90°42′41″W

Information
- Type: Public school
- School district: SJBP
- Principal: Shawn Oubre
- Teaching staff: 54.69 (on an FTE basis)
- Grades: 7 to 12
- Enrollment: 616 (2023–2024)
- Student to teacher ratio: 11.26
- Colors: Black and Gold
- Team name: Wildcats
- Rival: West St. John Rams; Lutcher High School
- Website: sjh.stjames.k12.la.us

St. James High School is a senior high school and middle school in Vacherie, Louisiana in St. James Parish. It is a part of the St. James Parish Public Schools and serves grades 7–12.

== Athletics ==
St. James High athletics competes in the LHSAA.

There are a variety of sports that are available to students, including boys' basketball, girls' basketball, baseball, softball, track and field, bowling, football, volleyball, and swimming.

State Championships
(5) Football: 1959, 1960, 1966, 1979, 2019

== Notable alumni ==
- John Folse, Chef, television/radio host and author
- Cory Geason, NFL Tight end
- Sai'vion Jones, Defensive end for the Denver Broncos
- Rydell Melancon, NFL linebacker
- Shazz Preston, Wide receiver for Tulane University
- Corey Webster, NFL defensive back
