= Lionel Washington =

American football player and coach (born 1960)

No. 48, 23
- Position: Defensive back

Personal information
- Born: October 21, 1960 (age 66); New Orleans, Louisiana, U.S.
- Listed height: 6 ft 0 in (1.83 m)
- Listed weight: 188 lb (85 kg)

Career information
- High school: Lutcher (Lutcher, Louisiana)
- College: Tulane (1979–1982)
- NFL draft: 1983: 4th round, 103rd overall pick

Career history

Playing
- St. Louis Cardinals (1983–1986); Los Angeles Raiders (1987–1994); Denver Broncos (1995–1996); Oakland Raiders (1997)

Coaching
- Green Bay Packers (1999–2008) Cornerbacks coach & nickelbacks coach; Oakland Raiders (2009–2010) Defensive backs coach; Virginia Destroyers (2011) Defensive backs coach; Tulane (2012–2017) Co-defensive coordinator & defensive backs coach; Southern (2018–2021) Defensive coordinator & cornerbacks coach

Awards and highlights
- UFL champion (2011)
- Stats at Pro Football Reference

Lionel Washington (born October 21, 1960) is an American former college football coach and player. He played as a cornerback for 15 seasons in the National Football League (NFL). Washington played college football for Tulane.

Washington was a nickelbacks/cornerbacks coach for the Green Bay Packers from 1999 to 2008. He was let go after a disappointing 2008 season. Before the 2009 season the Oakland Raiders hired him to be their defensive secondary coach. In 2011, Washington became defensive backs coach of the United Football League (UFL)'s Virginia Destroyers. In 2012, he was named co-defensive coordinator of the Tulane Green Wave football team.

Washington is the father of Deron Washington, a professional basketball player who was selected in the second round of the 2008 NBA draft.
