= St. James Parish Public Schools =

School district in Louisiana, United States

The St. James Parish Public Schools is a school district headquartered in Lutcher, Louisiana, United States. The district serves all of St. James Parish.

== Schools ==
=== Secondary schools ===
- Grades 7-12
  - Lutcher High School (Lutcher)
  - St. James High School (Unincorporated area)

=== Primary schools ===
- Grades 2-6
  - Vacherie Elementary School (South Vacherie)
- Grades PK-6
  - Fifth Ward Elementary School (Unincorporated area)
  - Gramercy Elementary School (Gramercy)
  - Lutcher Elementary School (Lutcher)
  - Paulina Elementary School (Unincorporated area)
  - Romeville Elementary School (Unincorporated area)
  - Sixth Ward Elementary School (Unincorporated area)
- Grades PK-1
  - Vacherie Primary School (South Vacherie)

=== Other Campuses ===
- Career & Technology Center (Lutcher)
- Science & Math Academy (Unincorporated area)

== Demographics ==
- Total Students (as of October 1, 2007): 4,181
- Gender
  - Male: 51%
  - Female: 49%
- Race/Ethnicity
  - African American: 67.35%
  - White: 32.00%
  - Hispanic: 0.50%
- Asian: 0.12%
  - Native American: 0.02%
- Socio-Economic Indicators
  - At-Risk: 67.50%
  - Free Lunch: 60.34%
  - Reduced Lunch: 7.14%

== See also ==
- List of school districts in Louisiana
