= Union, Louisiana =

- Unincorporated community
- Location within Louisiana Location within the United States
- Coordinates: 30°05′14″N 90°54′17″W
- Country: United States
- State: Louisiana
- Parish: St. James

Area
  - Total: 10.68 sq mi (27.65 km^{2})
  - Land: 9.55 sq mi (24.73 km^{2})
  - Water: 1.13 sq mi (2.92 km^{2})
- Elevation: 23 ft (7.0 m)

Population (2020)
  - Total: 735
  - Density: 77.0/sq mi (29.73/km^{2})
- Time zone: UTC-6 (Central (CST))
  - Summer (DST): UTC-5 (CDT)
- Area code: 225
- GNIS feature ID: 1628401

Union is an unincorporated community and census-designated place in St. James Parish, Louisiana, United States. As of the 2020 census, Union had a population of 735. The community is located along Louisiana Highway 44 on the east bank of the Mississippi River.

== Geography ==
According to the U.S. Census Bureau, the community has an area of 10.634 square miles (27.54 km^{2}); 9.506 square miles (24.62 km^{2}) of its area is land, and 1.128 square miles (2.92 km^{2}) is water.

== Demographics ==
Historical population
Census	Pop.	Note	%±
2010	892		—
2020	735		−17.6%
U.S. Decennial Census

Union first appeared as a census designated place in the 2010 U.S. census.

Union CDP, Louisiana – Racial and ethnic composition Note: the US Census treats Hispanic/Latino as an ethnic category. This table excludes Latinos from the racial categories and assigns them to a separate category. Hispanics/Latinos may be of any race.
Race / Ethnicity (NH = Non-Hispanic)	Pop 2010	Pop 2020	% 2010	% 2020
White alone (NH)	175	153	19.62%	20.82%
Black or African American alone (NH)	715	565	80.16%	76.87%
Native American or Alaska Native alone (NH)	0	0	0.00%	0.00%
Asian alone (NH)	0	0	0.00%	0.00%
Native Hawaiian or Pacific Islander alone (NH)	0	0	0.00%	0.00%
Other race alone (NH)	0	0	0.00%	0.00%
Mixed race or Multiracial (NH)	0	14	0.00%	1.90%
Hispanic or Latino (any race)	2	3	0.22%	0.41%
Total	892	735	100.00%	100.00%

It first appeared in the 2010 census with a population of 892. In 2020, its population was 735.
