= Hester, Louisiana =

- Unincorporated community
- Location within Louisiana Location within the United States
- Coordinates: 30°01′40″N 90°46′16″W
- Country: United States
- State: Louisiana
- Parish: St. James

Area
  - Total: 4.04 sq mi (10.47 km^{2})
  - Land: 3.46 sq mi (8.96 km^{2})
  - Water: 0.58 sq mi (1.50 km^{2})
- Elevation: 7 ft (2.1 m)

Population (2020)
  - Total: 483
  - Density: 139.6/sq mi (53.89/km^{2})
- Time zone: UTC-6 (Central (CST))
  - Summer (DST): UTC-5 (CDT)
- Area code: 225
- GNIS feature ID: 2583537

Hester is an unincorporated community and census-designated place in St. James Parish, Louisiana, United States. It was first listed as a CDP in the 2010 census. As of the 2020 census, Hester had a population of 483. The community is located along Louisiana Highway 44 on the east bank of the Mississippi River.

== Geography ==
Hester is located at 30.0276541°N 90.7710381°W. According to the U.S. Census Bureau, the community has an area of 4.041 square miles (10.47 km^{2}); 3.460 square miles (8.96 km^{2}) of its area is land, and 0.581 square miles (1.50 km^{2}) is water.

== Demographics ==
Historical population
Census	Pop.	Note	%±
2010	498		—
2020	483		−3.0%
U.S. Decennial Census

Hester first appeared as a census designated place in the 2010 U.S. census.

Hester CDP, Louisiana – Racial and ethnic composition Note: the U.S. Census Bureau treats Hispanic/Latino as an ethnic category. This table excludes Latinos from the racial categories and assigns them to a separate category. Hispanics/Latinos may be of any race.
Race / Ethnicity (NH = Non-Hispanic)	Pop 2010	Pop 2020	% 2010	% 2020
White alone (NH)	457	456	91.77%	94.41%
Black or African American alone (NH)	30	11	6.02%	2.28%
Native American or Alaska Native alone (NH)	1	1	0.20%	0.21%
Asian alone (NH)	1	0	0.20%	0.00%
Native Hawaiian or Pacific Islander alone (NH)	0	0	0.00%	0.00%
Other race alone (NH)	1	1	0.20%	0.21%
Mixed race or Multiracial (NH)	6	5	1.20%	1.04%
Hispanic or Latino (any race)	2	9	0.40%	1.86%
Total	498	483	100.00%	100.00%

At the 2020 census, its population was 483, down from 498 in 2010.
