= Lemannville, Louisiana =

- Census-designated place
- Location within the state of Louisiana
- Coordinates: 30°6′33″N 90°55′13″W
- Country: United States
- State: Louisiana
- Parishes: Ascension, St. James

Area
  - Total: 1.27 sq mi (3.30 km^{2})
  - Land: 1.01 sq mi (2.62 km^{2})
  - Water: 0.26 sq mi (0.68 km^{2})
- Elevation: 21 ft (6.4 m)

Population (2020)
  - Total: 695
  - Density: 686.3/sq mi (264.98/km^{2})
- Time zone: UTC-6 (Central (CST))
  - Summer (DST): UTC-5 (CST)
- FIPS code: 22-43255

Lemannville is an unincorporated community and census-designated place in Ascension and St. James parishes, Louisiana, United States. It was first listed as a CDP in the 2010 Census. Per the 2020 census, the population was 695.

== Geography ==
Lemannville is located on the west bank of the Mississippi River along Louisiana Highway 18, 6 miles (10 km) east of Donaldsonville and 60 miles (100 km) west of New Orleans.

== Demographics ==
Historical population
Census	Pop.	Note	%±
2010	860		—
2020	695		−19.2%
U.S. Decennial Census; 2010 2020

Lemannville first appeared as a census designated place in the 2010 U.S. census.

Lemannville CDP, Louisiana – Racial and ethnic composition Note: the U.S. Census Bureau treats Hispanic/Latino as an ethnic category. This table excludes Latinos from the racial categories and assigns them to a separate category. Hispanics/Latinos may be of any race.
Race / Ethnicity (NH = Non-Hispanic)	Pop 2010	Pop 2020	% 2010	% 2020
White alone (NH)	250	135	29.07%	19.42%
Black or African American alone (NH)	599	533	69.65%	76.69%
Native American or Alaska Native alone (NH)	0	1	0.00%	0.14%
Asian alone (NH)	0	0	0.00%	0.00%
Native Hawaiian or Pacific Islander alone (NH)	0	0	0.00%	0.00%
Other race alone (NH)	0	0	0.00%	0.00%
Mixed race or Multiracial (NH)	2	8	0.23%	1.15%
Hispanic or Latino (any race)	9	18	1.05%	2.59%
Total	860	695	100.00%	100.00%
