= Lutcher High School =

Location
- 1901 West Main Street; Lutcher, Louisiana 70071; United States; 30°02′45″N 90°41′41″W

Information
- Established: 1907
- School district: LHSAA 10-3A
- Principal: Angie Poche
- Staff: 70.14 (on an FTE basis)
- Grades: 7–12
- Enrollment: 981 (2023–2024)
- Student to teacher ratio: 13.99
- Colors: Purple and Gold
- Nickname: Bulldogs
- Rival: St. James Wildcats
- Website: lhs.stjames.k12.la.us

Lutcher High School, established in 1907, is located in Lutcher, Louisiana, United States. Lutcher High School currently serves as the only source of secondary education on the east bank of St. James Parish.

== Activities ==
Lutcher High offers a variety of organizations for students.

Clubs

- Art Club
- Band
- Beta Club
- Book Club
- Fellowship of Christian Athletes -FCA
- 4-H CLUB
- Hope Squad
- Junior Beta Club
- Yearbook Committee
- Student Council

Corps Groups

- Cheerleading
- Dance Team
- Majorettes
- Flag Team
- Marching Band

== Athletics ==
Lutcher High athletics competes in the LHSAA.

Sports

- Baseball
- Basketball
- Bowling
- Cross Country
- Football
- Flag Football
- Golf
- Softball
- Soccer
- Swimming
- Tennis
- Track
- Volleyball
- Weightlifting
- Team Management/Trainer

=== Championships ===
(9) Football state championships: 1975, 1978, 1983, 2003, 2006, 2008, 2015, 2016, 2022

(5) Baseball state championships: 1951, 1967, 1975, 2013, 2022, 2023

(16) Girls' Powerlifting state championships: 2007, 2008, 2009, 2010, 2011, 2012, 2013, 2014, 2015, 2016, 2017, 2018, 2019, 2021, 2022, 2023, 2024

(2) Softball state championships: 1998, 2009, 2024

(11) Boys' Swimming state championships: 1996, 1997, 1998, 1999, 2000, 2001, 2005, 2006, 2007, 2008, 2009

(1) Girls' Swimming state championship: 1951

== Notable alumni ==
- Jontre Kirklin, NFL, UFL wide receiver
- Jarvis Landry, NFL wide receiver
- Dexter McCoil, NFL defensive back
- Jared Poché, MLB pitcher
- Tijuana Ricks, Actress
- Sonja Steptoe, Journalist for SI, Time
- Lionel Washington, NFL defensive back
- Lenny Webster, MLB catcher
- Lunch Winfield, college football quarterback
