= River Parishes =

Subdivision in Louisiana, United States

Coordinates: 30.05°N 90.68°W

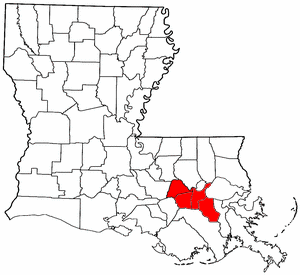
River Parishes. Ascension Parish in the north is not always considered a River Parish.

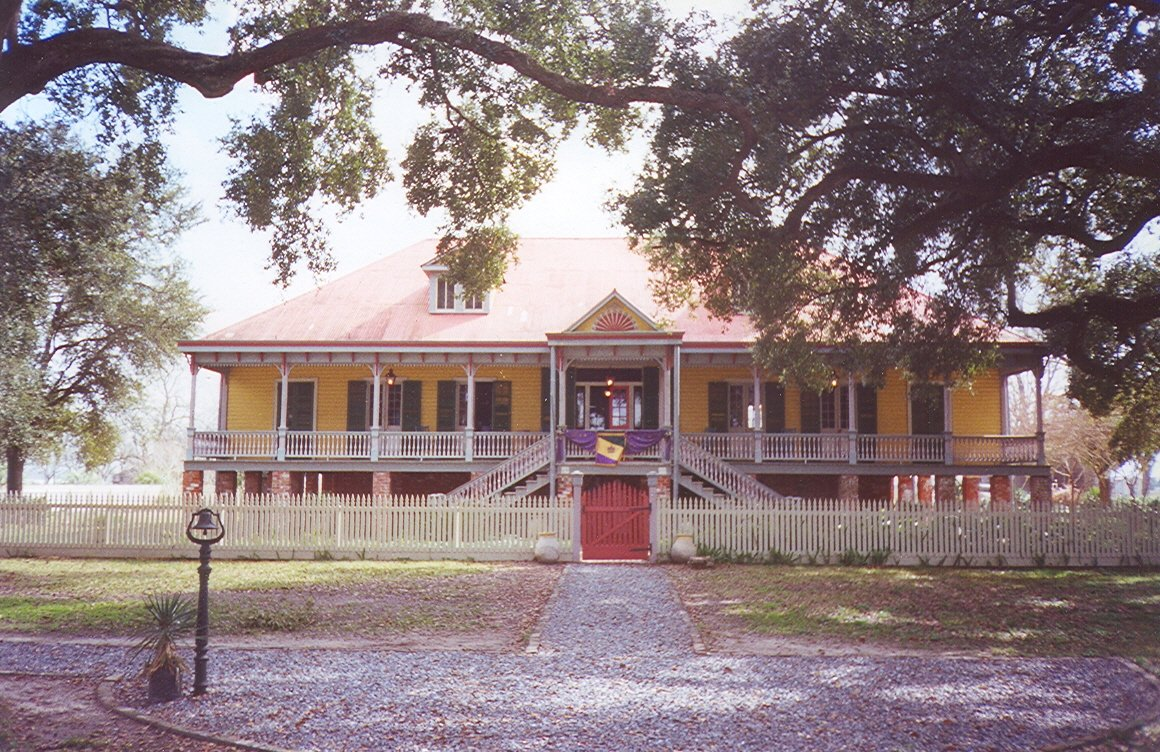
Main building at "Laura" Creole plantation, in Vacherie, St. James, 2002 photograph

The River Parishes are the parishes in Louisiana between New Orleans and Baton Rouge that span both banks of the Mississippi River, and are part of the larger Acadiana region. Traditionally they are considered to be St. Charles Parish, St. James Parish, and St. John the Baptist Parish. These parishes also made up a historical area once referred to as the German Coast of Louisiana. The River Road runs through the parishes.

Three of the parishes, St. Charles, St. John the Baptist and St. James, are also part of the New Orleans metropolitan area, based on the U.S. Census Bureau definition. Ascension Parish, was known historically as the Acadian Coast. Ascension Parish, sometimes included as part of the River Parishes sub-region, is home to the River Parishes Community College, chartered in 1997.

The area contains many architecturally significant historic plantation houses that are included among Louisiana's listings in the National Register of Historic Places.

The three traditional parishes have a combined land area of 1,939.04 km^{2} (748.67 sq mi). They have a total 2010 census population of 120,459 inhabitants. If Ascension Parish is included, the total land area is 2,694.10 km^{2} (1,040.198 sq mi) and the census population is 228,345.

Its four largest communities are all unincorporated census-designated places: LaPlace, Luling, Destrehan, and Reserve. Its two largest incorporated cities are located in Ascension Parish, which may not be considered by some to be within the community: Gonzales and Donaldsonville. Its largest community is also an unincorporated community in Ascension Parish census-designated place: Prairieville according to 2020 estimates. Another sizable community within the traditional parishes is St. Rose, also unincorporated. Still smaller in population, however, are the largest incorporated towns in the three-parish area: Lutcher and Gramercy. The largest of all communities in this region is LaPlace in St. John the Baptist Parish. But with Ascension Parish, the largest community would be instead Prairieville.

== Regional business and civic organizations ==
The River Parishes are served by the River Region Chamber of Commerce, a regional business advocacy organization representing St. Charles, St. John the Baptist, and St. James parishes. Since its founding in 2004, the Chamber has promoted economic development, regional collaboration, workforce development, and business networking across the River Parishes region.

The Chamber has been involved in regional economic initiatives and advocacy, including supporting infrastructure and industrial growth projects that affect the River Parishes' business community.

== See also ==
- Cancer Alley – health impacts from industrial plants in the parishes
