= Paulina, Louisiana =

- Unincorporated community
- Location within Louisiana Location within the United States
- Coordinates: 30°01′35″N 90°42′47″W
- Country: United States
- State: Louisiana
- Parish: St. James

Area
  - Total: 5.31 sq mi (13.76 km^{2})
  - Land: 4.62 sq mi (11.96 km^{2})
  - Water: 0.69 sq mi (1.80 km^{2})
- Elevation: 7 ft (2.1 m)

Population (2020)
  - Total: 1,778
  - Density: 385.1/sq mi (148.68/km^{2})
- Time zone: UTC-6 (Central (CST))
  - Summer (DST): UTC-5 (CDT)
- ZIP code: 70763
- Area code: 225
- GNIS feature ID: 2583544

Paulina is an unincorporated community and census-designated place in St. James Parish, Louisiana, United States. As of the 2020 census, Paulina had a population of 1,778. The community is located on the east bank of the Mississippi River in the eastern part of the parish, west of Lutcher and across the river from Vacherie. Paulina has a post office with ZIP code 70763.

== Demographics ==
Historical population
Census	Pop.	Note	%±
2010	1,178		—
2020	1,778		50.9%
U.S. Decennial Census; 2010 2020

Paulina first appeared as a census designated place in the 2010 U.S. census.

Paulina CDP, Louisiana – Racial and ethnic composition Note: the US Census treats Hispanic/Latino as an ethnic category. This table excludes Latinos from the racial categories and assigns them to a separate category. Hispanics/Latinos may be of any race.
Race / Ethnicity (NH = Non-Hispanic)	Pop 2010	Pop 2020	% 2010	% 2020
White alone (NH)	976	1,521	82.85%	85.55%
Black or African American alone (NH)	167	185	14.18%	10.40%
Native American or Alaska Native alone (NH)	4	0	0.34%	0.00%
Asian alone (NH)	4	0	0.34%	0.00%
Native Hawaiian or Pacific Islander alone (NH)	0	0	0.00%	0.00%
Other race alone (NH)	0	1	0.00%	0.06%
Mixed race or Multiracial (NH)	11	34	0.93%	1.91%
Hispanic or Latino (any race)	16	37	1.36%	2.08%
Total	1,178	1,778	100.00%	100.00%

In 2010, the CDP had a population of 1,178 and by 2020 its population grew to 1,778.
