= Perique =

Type of tobacco from Louisiana

Perique (/pəˈriːk/) is a type of tobacco from Grand Point, Louisiana (St James Parish), known for its strong, powerful, and fruity aroma. When the Acadians made their way into this region in 1776, the Choctaw and Chickasaw tribes were cultivating a variety of tobacco with a distinctive flavor. A farmer named Pierre Chenet is credited with first turning this local tobacco into what is now known as Perique in 1824 through the labor-intensive technique of pressure-fermentation. It is reported by John C. Leffingwell, PhD, an authority on tobacco, that Perique is based on a variety of Red Burley (USDA Type 72) leaf. The Tobacco Institute says perique has been shipped out of New Orleans for more than 250 years and is considered to be one of America's first export crops.

== Production ==
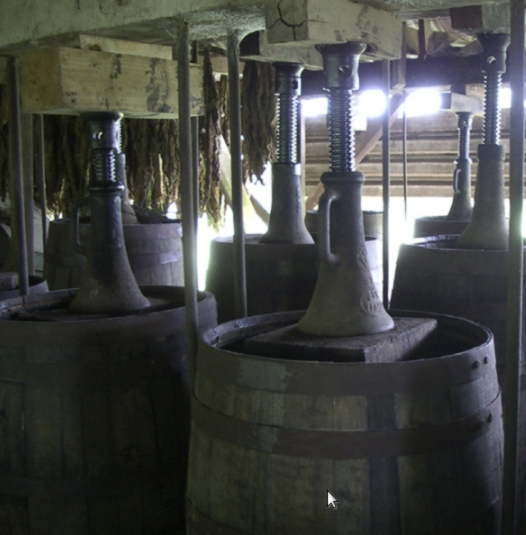
Perique tobacco leaves being fermented in bourbon barrels

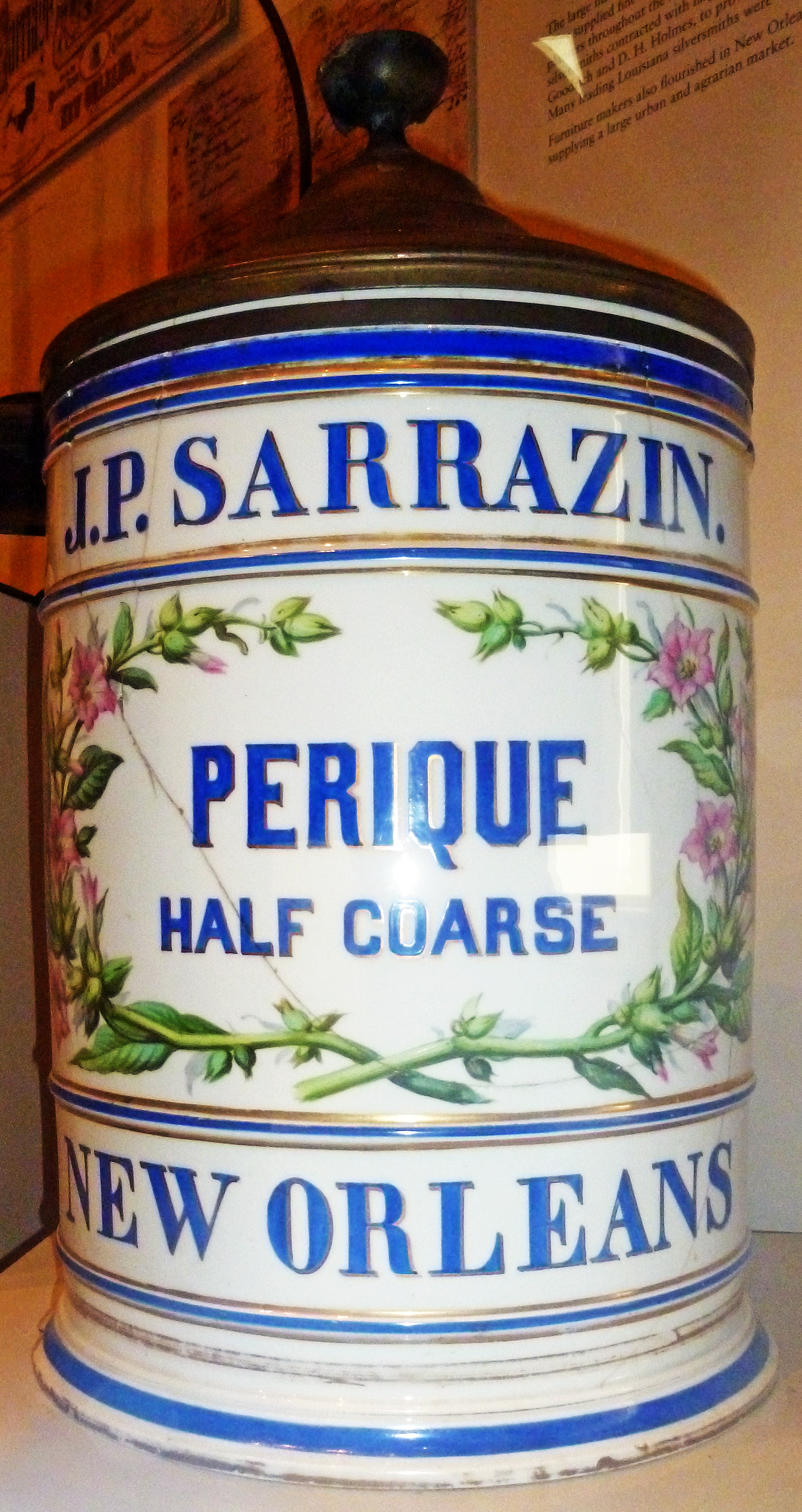
An antique jar for dispensing perique tobacco

The tobacco plants are manually kept suckerless and pruned to exactly 12 leaves through their early growth. In late June, when the leaves are a dark, rich green and the plants are 24–30 inches (60–75 cm) tall, the whole plant is harvested in the late evening and hung to dry in a sideless curing barn. Once the leaves have partially dried but are still supple (usually less than 2 weeks in the barn), any remaining dirt is removed and the leaves are moistened with water and stemmed by hand. The leaves are then rolled into "torquettes" of approximately 1 pound (450 g) and packed into hickory whiskey barrels. The tobacco is kept under pressure using oak blocks and massive screw jacks, forcing nearly all the air out of the still-moist leaves. Approximately once a month the pressure is released, and each of the torquettes is worked by hand to permit a little air back into the tobacco. After a year of this treatment, the perique is ready for consumption, although it may be kept fresh under pressure for many years. Extended exposure to air degrades the particular character of perique. The finished tobacco is dark brown - nearly black - very moist with a fruity, slightly vinegary aroma. The fruity aroma is the result of hundreds of volatile compounds created by anaerobic fermentation of the tobacco. Many of these are responsible for the flavors of fruits and are often found in wine.

Often considered the truffle of pipe tobaccos by connoisseurs, perique is used as a component of various blended pipe tobaccos, as many people consider it too strong to be smoked pure. At one time, the fresh and moist perique was also chewed, but none is now sold for this purpose.

Pierre Chenet's grand daughter, Coralie Decareau, married Celestin Poche in February 1829, and the Poche family has been involved in the cultivation and processing of Perique tobacco through current times. By the late 1990's, Perique had fallen out of favor, and the number of farmers growing it had dwindled to just one. But interest in the variety rebounded, and as of May 2017, the number of growers planting Perique tobacco commercially in Saint James Parish has risen to 25.

While traditionally a pipe tobacco (and still available from some specialist tobacconists), perique can also be found in Santa Fe Natural Tobacco Company's perique cigarettes under the Natural American Spirit brand in an approximately 1 part to 5 blend with lighter tobaccos. These cigarettes are marketed in a black box (Perique Rich Robust) and in a gray box (Perique Rich). Loose tobacco for rolling is sold by the same company in black pouches. Perique is also featured in the Mysterioso line of cigars made by the Connecticut Valley Tobacconist. Mysterioso is available with a genuine Connecticut shade wrapper, genuine aged Louisiana Perique, and Honduran tobacco. In 2014, Philippine-based cigar manufacturer Tabacalera Incorporada created the 1881 Perique. These cigars use Louisiana Perique alongside Brazilian and Philippine filler tobacco. Following this, Tabacalera released other cigars using Perique tobacco in 2016: the Tabacalera Gran Reserva, the Don Juan Urquijo Perique, and the 1881 Perique Bold, which is the same as the 1881 Perique but finished in a dark Maduro wrapper.

== Perique liqueur ==
Distiller Ted Breaux has been distilling Perique Liqueur de Tabac, a liqueur from Perique tobacco since 2006. The liqueur is distilled in the Combier distillery in Saumur, France.

== See also ==
- Agriculture in Louisiana
- Desire Plantation: a former slave-labor perique plantation

== General and cited references ==
- Fuller, R. Reese (Spring 2003). "Perique, the Native Crop". Louisiana Life.
- Poche, L. Aristee (2002). Perique Tobacco: Mystery and History.
