= St. James Parish, Louisiana =

Parish in Louisiana, United States

St. James Parish
- Parish
- Parish of St. James; Paroisse de Saint-Jacques (French)
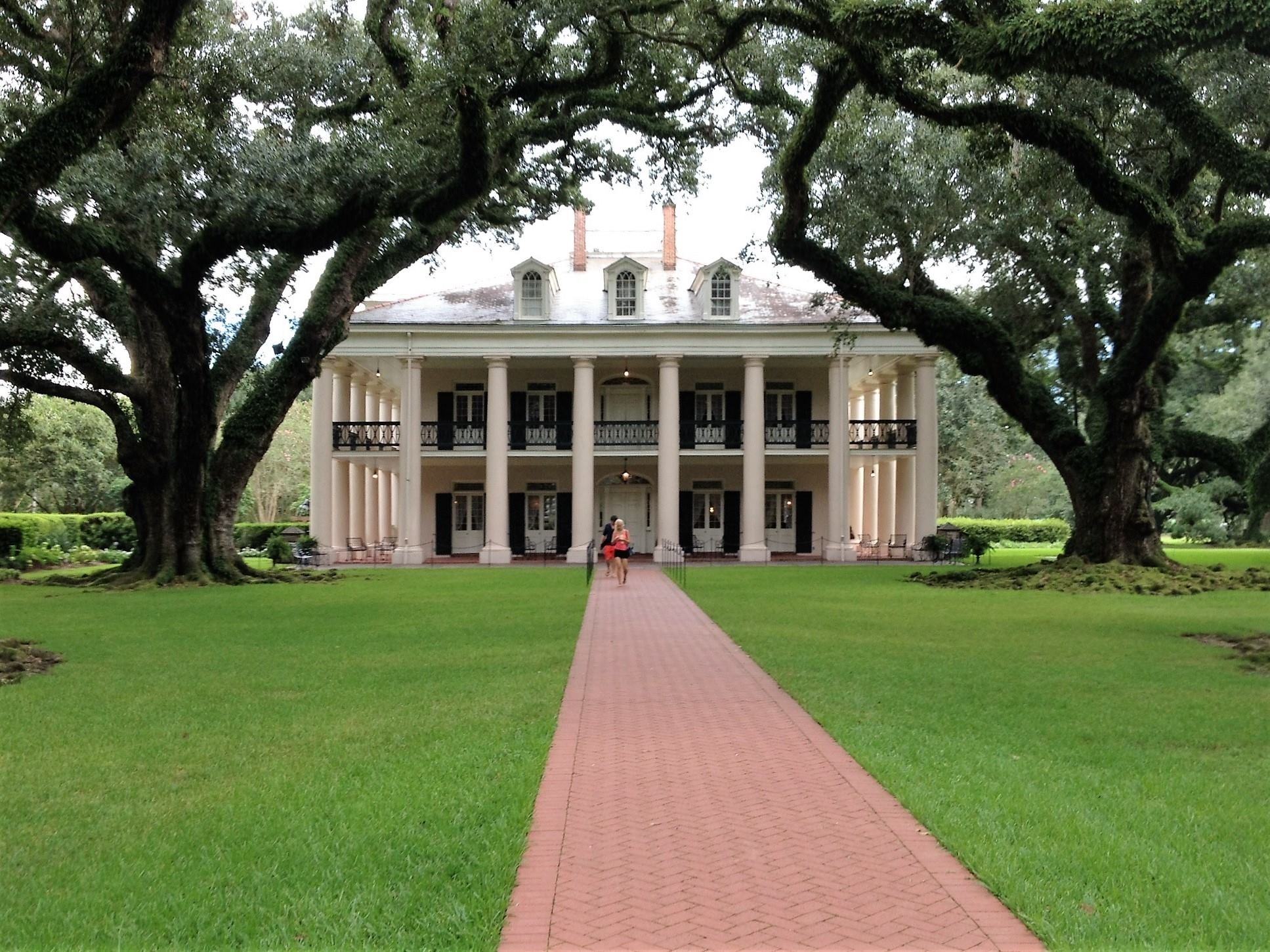
- Oak Alley Plantation Mansion

- Seal

- Location within the U.S. state of Louisiana
- Coordinates: 30°02′N 90°48′W
- Country: United States
- State: Louisiana
- Founded: March 31, 1807
- Named for: St. James
- Seat: Convent
- Largest town: Lutcher

Area
  - Total: 258 sq mi (670 km^{2})
  - Land: 242 sq mi (630 km^{2})
  - Water: 16 sq mi (41 km^{2}) 6.4%

Population (2020)
  - Total: 20,192
  - Estimate (2025): 18,938 ▼
  - Density: 83.4/sq mi (32.2/km^{2})
- Time zone: UTC−6 (Central)
  - Summer (DST): UTC−5 (CDT)
- Congressional district: 2nd
- Website: www.stjamesla.com

St. James Parish (French: Paroisse de Saint-Jacques) is a parish located in the U.S. state of Louisiana. The parish seat is Convent. The parish was created in 1807. St. James Parish is a part of the New Orleans–Metairie, Louisiana metropolitan statistical area, sitting between New Orleans and Baton Rouge on the Mississippi River. According to the 2020 United States census, the population was 20,192.

== History ==
St. James is one of the state's nineteen original parishes, created by act of the territorial legislature, March 31, 1807. The original seat of government was the community of St. James, on the west bank of the Mississippi, but this was moved in 1869 to what is now Convent, on the east bank.

St. James Parish is part of the Acadian Coast. While it is possible that some Acadians did arrive prior to 1755 or between 1755 and 1764, the first documented group of Acadians [4 families: 20 individuals] arrived in New Orleans in February 1764. The arrival was documented in a letter dated April 6, 1764, from Governor D'Abbadie to his superior in France. They were settled along the Mississippi River in present-day St. James.

St. James is known for its tradition, Bonfires on the Levee, which takes place every Christmas Eve. Residents build large bonfires along the River levee, lighting them all at nightfall. The townsfolk tell the children that the purpose of this tradition is so Papa Noel can easily see his way down the Mississippi as he is delivering gifts.

St. James is the only cultivation site in the world for Perique tobacco, introduced by an Acadian exile, Pierre Chenet, whose nickname was "Perique." It has been produced by his descendants for nearly two centuries (now covering only a 300-acre (1.2 km^{2}) tract) and is in great demand by large tobacco companies.

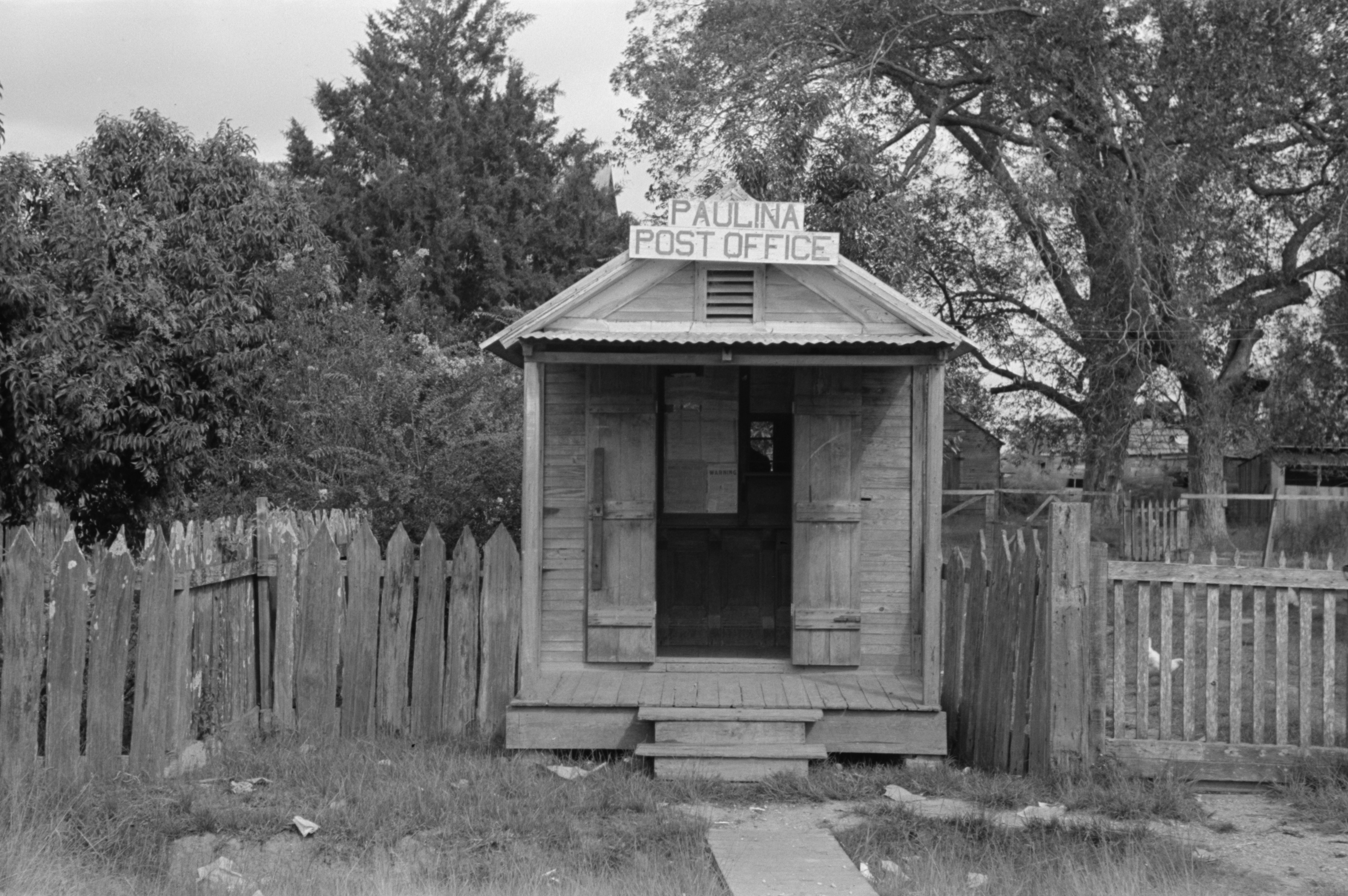
Post office in Paulina, 1938

== Geography ==
According to the U.S. Census Bureau, the parish has a total area of 258 square miles (670 km^{2}), of which 242 square miles (630 km^{2}) is land and 16 square miles (41 km^{2}) (6.4%) is water. It is the fourth-smallest parish in Louisiana by land area and second-smallest by total area.

=== Major highways ===
- Interstate 10
- U.S. Highway 61
- Louisiana Highway 18
- Louisiana Highway 20
- Louisiana Highway 44
- Louisiana Highway 70 (Sunshine Bridge across Mississippi River)
- Louisiana Highway 641
- Louisiana Highway 642
- Louisiana Highway 643
- Louisiana Highway 644
- Louisiana Highway 3125
- Louisiana Highway 3127
- Louisiana Highway 3193
- Louisiana Highway 3213 (Gramercy Bridge across Mississippi River)
- Louisiana Highway 3214
- Louisiana Highway 3219
- Louisiana Highway 3274

=== Adjacent parishes ===
- Ascension Parish (north)
- St. John the Baptist Parish (east)
- Lafourche Parish (south)
- Assumption Parish (west)

=== Communities ===
==== Towns ====
- Gramercy
- Lutcher (largest town)

==== Census-designated places ====
- Convent (parish seat)
- Grand Point
- Hester
- Lemannville
- Moonshine
- North Vacherie
- Paulina
- Romeville
- South Vacherie
- St. James
- Union
- Welcome

==== Other unincorporated community ====
- Vacherie

== Demographics ==
Historical population
Census	Pop.	Note	%±
1820	5,660		—
1830	7,146		26.3%
1840	8,548		19.6%
1850	11,098		29.8%
1860	11,499		3.6%
1870	10,152		−11.7%
1880	14,714		44.9%
1890	15,715		6.8%
1900	20,197		28.5%
1910	23,009		13.9%
1920	21,228		−7.7%
1930	15,338		−27.7%
1940	16,596		8.2%
1950	15,334		−7.6%
1960	18,369		19.8%
1970	19,733		7.4%
1980	21,495		8.9%
1990	20,879		−2.9%
2000	21,216		1.6%
2010	22,102		4.2%
2020	20,192		−8.6%
2025 (est.)	18,938	▼	−6.2%
U.S. Decennial Census; 1790-1960 1900-1990; 1990-2000 2010-2013

St. James Parish, Louisiana – Racial and ethnic composition Note: the U.S. Census Bureau treats Hispanic/Latino as an ethnic category. This table excludes Latinos from the racial categories and assigns them to a separate category. Hispanics/Latinos may be of any race.
Race / Ethnicity (NH = Non-Hispanic)	Pop 1980	Pop 1990	Pop 2000	Pop 2010	Pop 2020	% 1980	% 1990	% 2000	% 2010	% 2020
White alone (NH)	11,155	10,420	10,538	10,478	9,917	51.90%	49.91%	49.67%	47.41%	49.11%
Black or African American alone (NH)	9,983	10,329	10,444	11,145	9,486	46.44%	49.47%	49.23%	50.43%	46.98%
Native American or Alaska Native alone (NH)	2	5	19	43	28	0.01%	0.02%	0.09%	0.19%	0.14%
Asian alone (NH)	25	16	10	29	28	0.12%	0.08%	0.05%	0.13%	0.14%
Native Hawaiian or Pacific Islander alone (NH)	x	x	0	3	0	x	x	0.00%	0.01%	0.00%
Other race alone (NH)	0	2	3	13	28	0.00%	0.01%	0.01%	0.06%	0.14%
Mixed race or Multiracial (NH)	x	x	72	135	362	x	x	0.34%	0.61%	1.79%
Hispanic or Latino (any race)	330	107	130	256	343	1.54%	0.51%	0.61%	1.16%	1.70%
Total	21,495	20,879	21,216	22,102	20,192	100.00%	100.00%	100.00%	100.00%	100.00%

As of the 2020 United States census, there were 20,192 people, 7,719 households, and 5,732 families residing in the parish. Its racial and ethnic makeup in 2020 was 49.11% non-Hispanic white, 46.98% Black and African American, 0.145 Native American, 0.14% Asian, 1.93% other or mixed race, and 1.7% Hispanic or Latin American of any race. In 2019, the racial and ethnic makeup was 48.2% non-Hispanic white, 49.6% Black and African American, 0.2% Asian, 0.4% two or more races, and 1.7% Hispanic or Latin American of any race. At the 2010 census, the racial and ethnic composition of the parish was 50.6% Black or African American, 48.0% White, 0.2% Native American, 0.1% Asian, 0.4% of some other race and 0.7% of two or more races. 1.2% were Hispanic or Latin American (of any race). An estimated 15.2% of the parish were of French ancestry at the 2019 census estimates. In 2000, 93.78% of the population spoke only English at home, while 4.97% spoke French or Cajun French .

There were 7,719 households and 8,919 housing units in 2019, and the median household income was $51,603; the median housing value was $158,500 and the median rent was $644. From 2015 to 2019, the parish had a poverty rate of 17.0%. In 2000, the median income for a household in the parish was $35,277, and the median income for a family was $41,751. Males had a median income of $37,487 versus $21,712 for females. The per capita income for the parish was $14,381. 20.70% of the population and 18.00% of families were below the poverty line. Out of the total people living in poverty, 27.70% are under the age of 18 and 15.10% are 65 or older.

According to the Association of Religion Data Archives in 2020, the Roman Catholic Church dominated the parish, with Christianity being the area's predominant religion since colonization. Roman Catholics numbered 19,342 while the National Baptist Convention of the United States of America had 2,180 members. Non/inter-denominational Protestants among the congregationalist, Bible, and United and Uniting churches numbered 1,060.

== Economy ==
Approximately 85% of reported air pollution in the parish is produced by industries located in two small majority African American communities: Convent and St James. These include the Shell Convent Refinery, an Occidental Chemical Factory, American Styrenics, and Mosaic Fertilizer.

Formosa Plastic Group plans to build a $9.4 billion petrochemical plant in the parish. The proposed plant site includes a plantation and the graves of enslaved people. The project has become the focal point of an environmental justice protest because of the expectant rise in pollution and the disrespect of the historic nature of the land involved.

== Education ==
St. James Parish Public Schools serves all of St. James Parish.

== Politics ==
The current parish president is Peter “Pete” Dufresne (D), who took office at the beginning of 2020. In 2016, his predecessor Timmy Roussel was indicted on corruption charges, when he was accused of having parish employees build a private natural gas line.

St. James Parish has been strongly Democratic for a century. However, Donald Trump performed well during his two campaigns, coming within ten points of carrying the parish in 2016 and within five points in 2020. Trump would later win the parish in the 2024 election, the first Republican to do so since 1972. The last Republican to win a majority of the parish's vote until 2024 was Warren G. Harding in 1920, when Louisiana's Acadian population revolted against Woodrow Wilson because of his bitter disagreement with French President Georges Clemenceau. Dwight D. Eisenhower won a 17-vote plurality in 1956, and Richard Nixon also won a plurality in his 2,900-plus-county 1972 landslide.

United States presidential election results for St. James Parish, Louisiana
Year	Republican		Democratic		Third party(ies)	
Year	No.	%	No.	%	No.	%
1912	228	33.58%	367	54.05%	84	12.37%
1916	185	25.45%	520	71.53%	22	3.03%
1920	533	60.91%	342	39.09%	0	0.00%
1924	278	31.03%	615	68.64%	3	0.33%
1928	128	7.93%	1,486	92.07%	0	0.00%
1932	240	12.28%	1,715	87.72%	0	0.00%
1936	259	14.12%	1,575	85.88%	0	0.00%
1940	506	25.70%	1,463	74.30%	0	0.00%
1944	265	16.04%	1,387	83.96%	0	0.00%
1948	453	21.40%	859	40.58%	805	38.03%
1952	1,353	38.46%	2,165	61.54%	0	0.00%
1956	1,849	49.19%	1,832	48.74%	78	2.08%
1960	620	11.67%	4,362	82.09%	332	6.25%
1964	1,467	25.82%	4,214	74.18%	0	0.00%
1968	778	11.91%	2,987	45.74%	2,765	42.34%
1972	3,112	49.47%	2,633	41.85%	546	8.68%
1976	2,751	36.85%	4,531	60.69%	184	2.46%
1980	3,429	34.90%	6,206	63.17%	189	1.92%
1984	4,627	43.10%	5,989	55.79%	119	1.11%
1988	3,799	35.44%	6,707	62.57%	213	1.99%
1992	3,339	29.85%	6,609	59.08%	1,238	11.07%
1996	2,832	26.36%	7,247	67.46%	664	6.18%
2000	3,813	35.62%	6,523	60.93%	369	3.45%
2004	4,545	40.92%	6,407	57.68%	156	1.40%
2008	5,432	43.23%	6,994	55.67%	138	1.10%
2012	5,209	42.03%	7,059	56.95%	127	1.02%
2016	5,456	45.15%	6,418	53.11%	211	1.75%
2020	5,954	47.29%	6,510	51.71%	126	1.00%
2024	5,902	50.06%	5,792	49.13%	95	0.81%

== See also ==
- National Register of Historic Places listings in St. James Parish, Louisiana
- Acadian Coast
- German Coast
- River Parishes
- Perique
- George T. Oubre
