= Acadian Coast =

The Acadian Coast is a name which is applied by historians to the section of Louisiana along the Mississippi River that was settled by the exiled Acadians, beginning in 1764.

While applying particularly to the present Saint James Parish, the term is sometimes used to designate the Acadian settlements just up the Mississippi in Ascension Parish.

The Acadian Coast can also apply to the Gulf coast of north-eastern and south-eastern New Brunswick, where the majority of the population and communities are Acadian. These regions have been populated by the Acadians since 1764, when the British allowed them to return to Nova Scotia following their expulsion nine years earlier. The coast was detached from Nova Scotia and included in the new province of New Brunswick in 1784.

== See also ==
- Acadiana - geography
