= Lutcher, Louisiana =

Lutcher
- Town
- Town of Lutcher
- Motto: “Go Bulldogs!”
- Location of Lutcher in St. James Parish, Louisiana.

- Location of Louisiana in the United States
- Coordinates: 30°02′56″N 90°41′59″W
- Country: United States
- State: Louisiana
- Parish: St. James
- Named for: Henry J. Lutcher

Area
  - Total: 3.41 sq mi (8.82 km^{2})
  - Land: 3.37 sq mi (8.73 km^{2})
  - Water: 0.035 sq mi (0.09 km^{2})
- Elevation: 16 ft (4.9 m)

Population (2020)
  - Total: 3,133
  - Density: 929.4/sq mi (358.86/km^{2})
- Time zone: UTC-6 (CST)
  - Summer (DST): UTC-5 (CDT)
- Postal code: 70071
- Area code: 225
- FIPS code: 22-46720

Lutcher is a town in St. James Parish, Louisiana, United States, on the east bank of the Mississippi River. It is part of the Greater New Orleans metropolitan area . The population was 3,559 at the 2010 U.S. census, and 3,127 at the 2020 population estimates program.

== History ==
Lutcher was established as a sawmill town, named after Henry J. Lutcher who was a sawmill operator and businessman. Lutcher is also where James Mather and his family established a sugar plantation, and where Mather died in 1821. The Bank of Lutcher was organized by George H. Jones, M. D., son of Dr. John Welch Jones.

Starting in the late 1800s, Christmas bonfires are built along the Mississippi River levee near Lutcher. This tradition has often occurred on Christmas Eve and it says that the bonfires are made to light a path for Papa Noel.

On August 29, 2005, Lutcher sustained damage from Hurricane Katrina. On the same day sixteen years later, the town sustained significant damage from Hurricane Ida.

== Geography ==
Lutcher is located at 30°2′56″N 90°41′59″W (30.048867, -90.699744). According to the United States Census Bureau, the town has a total area of 3.4 square miles (8.8 km^{2}), of which 3.4 square miles (8.7 km^{2}) is land and 0.04 square mile (0.1 km^{2}) (0.88%) is water. Lutcher is bordered by the Mississippi River and the town of Gramercy. Lutcher is approximately 36 miles west of New Orleans

== Demographics ==
Historical population
| Census | Pop. | Note | %± |
|---|---|---|---|
| 1920 | 1,700 | | — |
| 1930 | 1,481 | | −12.9% |
| 1940 | 2,167 | | 46.3% |
| 1950 | 2,198 | | 1.4% |
| 1960 | 3,274 | | 49.0% |
| 1970 | 3,911 | | 19.5% |
| 1980 | 4,730 | | 20.9% |
| 1990 | 3,907 | | −17.4% |
| 2000 | 3,735 | | −4.4% |
| 2010 | 3,559 | | −4.7% |
| 2020 | 3,133 | | −12.0% |
| 2025 (est.) | 2,822 | ▼ | −9.9% |
U.S. Decennial Census

Lutcher town, Louisiana – Racial and ethnic composition Note: the U.S. Census Bureau treats Hispanic/Latino as an ethnic category. This table excludes Latinos from the racial categories and assigns them to a separate category. Hispanics/Latinos may be of any race.
| Race / Ethnicity (NH = Non-Hispanic) | Pop 2000 | Pop 2010 | Pop 2020 | % 2000 | % 2010 | % 2020 |
|---|---|---|---|---|---|---|
| White alone (NH) | 1,854 | 1,634 | 1,405 | 49.64% | 45.91% | 44.85% |
| Black or African American alone (NH) | 1,859 | 1,861 | 1,623 | 49.77% | 52.29% | 51.80% |
| Native American or Alaska Native alone (NH) | 2 | 3 | 4 | 0.05% | 0.08% | 0.13% |
| Asian alone (NH) | 1 | 7 | 8 | 0.03% | 0.20% | 0.26% |
| Native Hawaiian or Pacific Islander alone (NH) | 0 | 0 | 0 | 0.00% | 0.00% | 0.00% |
| Other race alone (NH) | 0 | 5 | 9 | 0.00% | 0.14% | 0.29% |
| Mixed race or Multiracial (NH) | 6 | 33 | 43 | 0.16% | 0.93% | 1.37% |
| Hispanic or Latino (any race) | 13 | 16 | 41 | 0.35% | 0.45% | 1.31% |
| Total | 3,735 | 3,559 | 3,133 | 100.00% | 100.00% | 100.00% |

As of the 2020 United States census, there were 3,133 people, 1,321 households, and 942 families residing in the town. At the 2019 American Community Survey, the racial and ethnic makeup of Lutcher was 51.9% non-Hispanic white, 46.4% Black and African American, and 1.7% Hispanic and Latin American of any race. The median household income from 2015 to 2019 was $44,347, and males had a median annual income of $52,589 versus $41,722 for females. An estimated 11.2% of the population lived at or below the poverty line.

At the 2000 U.S. census, there were 3,735 people, 1,252 households, and 986 families residing in the town. The population density was 1,107.3 inhabitants per square mile (427.5/km^{2}). There were 1,368 housing units at an average density of 405.5 per square mile (156.6/km^{2}). The racial makeup of the town was 49.91% White, 49.77% African American, 0.05% Native American, 0.03% Asian, 0.05% from other races, and 0.19% from two or more races. Hispanics or Latin Americans of any race were 0.35% of the population.

There were 1,252 households, out of which 36.1% had children under the age of 18 living with them, 54.9% were married couples living together, 19.9% had a female householder with no husband present, and 21.2% were non-families. 18.9% of all households were made up of individuals, and 7.9% had someone living alone who was 65 years of age or older. The average household size was 2.90 and the average family size was 3.33. In the town, the population was spread out, with 26.7% under the age of 18, 10.0% from 18 to 24, 25.5% from 25 to 44, 23.8% from 45 to 64, and 14.0% who were 65 years of age or older. The median age was 36 years. For every 100 females, there were 90.5 males. For every 100 females age 18 and over, there were 85.1 males.

In 2000, the median income for a household in the town was $34,167, and the median income for a family was $42,317. Males had a median income of $40,769 versus $22,257 for females. The per capita income for the town was $15,129. About 21.1% of families and 23.1% of the population were below the poverty line, including 31.2% of those under age 18 and 18.9% of those age 65 or over.

== Education ==
St. James Parish Public Schools operates public schools:

- Lutcher High School (7–12)

== Notable people ==
- Roy Bourgeois, human rights activist and laicized Catholic priest
- Randal Gaines, former resident and member of the Louisiana House of Representatives for St. Charles and St. John the Baptist parishes
- David Jones, jazz musician
- Jarvis Landry, American football player
- Ron Landry, lawyer and Louisiana state senator
- Henry J. Lutcher, sawmiller
- James Mather, mayor of New Orleans
- Leon Roppolo, early jazz clarinetist
- Lionel Washington, American football player and coach
- Lenny Webster, former resident and former catcher for the Minnesota Twins.

== See also ==
- Christmas bonfires
