= List of American houses =

This is a list of American houses by state.

== California ==
- Bidwell Mansion: home of John Bidwell and Annie Bidwell in Chico, California
- Bourn Mansion; Georgian-style mansion built for William Bowers Bourn II and his wife, Agnes Moody Bourn in Pacific Heights, San Francisco, California
- Carolands: the 65,000 sq ft mansion of Harriet Pullman Carolan in Hillsborough, California.
- Eames House: the residence of Charles and Ray Eames
- El Fureidis: the Bertram Grosvenor Goodhue house owned by Sergey Grishin in Montecito, California
- Ennis House: a Mayan Revival architecture home, designed by Frank Lloyd Wright in Los Angeles, California.
- Filoli: a free Georgian style mansion built for William Bowers Bourn II and his wife, Agnes Moody Bourn in Woodside, California; the setting for the American soap opera Dynasty
- Gamble House: the residence of David Gamble (of Procter & Gamble) in Pasadena, California built by Greene & Greene.
- Garden of Alla: an estate owned by actress Alla Nazimova in West Hollywood, California during the 1920s. It was demolished in 1959.
- George W. Marston House: 1905 home of George Marston and wife, Anna Marston. Located in Balboa Park, San Diego, California.
- Harold Lloyd Estate: is a large mansion and landscaped estate located in the Benedict Canyon section of Beverly Hills, California; residence of silent film star Harold Lloyd
- Hearst Castle: the grand mansion of publisher William Randolph Hearst at San Simeon, California
- Lovell House by Richard Neutra
- Neverland Ranch, the home of musician Michael Jackson, in Santa Barbara County, California
- The Playboy Mansion: magazine publisher Hugh Hefner's mansion
- Pickfair: the former Beverly Hills, California residence of film actors and married couple Mary Pickford and Douglas Fairbanks.
- The Manor: a Châteauesque mansion and the former residence of television producer Aaron Spelling, it is located in the Holmby Hills neighborhood of Los Angeles, California, and is currently listed as the most expensive home in the United States
- Von Sternberg House
- Winchester Mystery House: the haunted mansion of Winchester Rifle heiress, Sarah Winchester
- Wrigley Mansion: former home of William Wrigley Jr., of the famous chewing gum company, now headquarters of the Tournament of Roses Association in Pasadena, California

== Colorado ==
- Hala Ranch: an estate located just north of Aspen, Colorado, in the Rocky Mountains, originally purchased and given its name by part-time resident Prince Bandar bin Sultan of Saudi Arabia
- Molly Brown House: home of Unsinkable Molly Brown, the famous RMS Titanic survivor in Denver, Colorado

== Connecticut ==
- Gillette Castle: the eccentric residence of actor William Gillette in East Haddam, Connecticut
- Lockwood-Mathews Mansion: a 62-room Second Empire mansion open to the public in Norwalk, Connecticut
- Mark Twain House: the American High Gothic style house where Samuel Langhorne Clemens (Mark Twain) and his family lived from 1874 to 1891 in Hartford, Connecticut.
- Loomis Homestead: one the oldest timber-frame houses in America in Windsor, Connecticut.

== Delaware ==
- Hagley Museum and Library: the Brandywine Valley home of Eleuthere Irenee du Pont in Wilmington, Delaware
- Nemours: the 300-acre French estate of Alfred I. du Pont in Wilmington, Delaware
- Winterthur: the fifth largest residence in America was home to industrialist Henry Francis du Pont in Winterthur, Delaware

== District of Columbia ==
- Dumbarton Oaks: the mansion of Robert Woods Bliss in Washington, D.C.
- The White House: designed by James Hoban in the Palladian style, it is the official residence and workplace of the president of the United States.
- The Wylie Mansion: the former residence of judge Andrew Wylie in Washington, D.C.

== Florida ==
- Cà d'Zan: John Ringling mansion, Sarasota, Florida
- Mar-a-Lago: a mansion and estate in Palm Beach, Florida; the former residence of Marjorie Merriweather Post and Edward F. Hutton; the current residence of Donald Trump; it was added as a National Historic Landmark in 1980.
- Villa Vizcaya: James Deering mansion, Miami, Florida
- Whitehall: the estate of Florida developer and Standard Oil partner Henry Morrison Flagler in Palm Beach, Florida.

== Georgia ==
- Margaret Mitchell House and Museum: the house where Margaret Mitchell wrote Gone with the Wind

== Illinois ==
- Glessner House: Chicago, H. H. Richardson, architect
- Hull House: Jane Addams' settlement house for immigrants and the poor in Chicago, Illinois
- Robie House: Frank Lloyd Wright-designed residence, Chicago, a U.S. National Historical Landmark

== Louisiana ==
- Laura Plantation: a Créole-style historic plantation in St. James Parish, Louisiana, on the West Bank of the Mississippi River near Vacherie, Louisiana
- Oak Alley Plantation: a historic plantation located on the Mississippi River in the community of Vacherie, Louisiana; residence of Jacques Telesphore Roman.
- St. Joseph Plantation: a historic plantation located on the west bank of the Mississippi River in the town of Vacherie, Louisiana; residence of Josephine Aime Ferrie

== Maine ==
- Bush compound: the summer home of U.S. President George H. W. Bush located adjacent to the Atlantic Ocean in southern Maine, near the town of Kennebunkport; the mansion was purchased by St. Louis banker George Herbert Walker and has remained as a summer retreat for the Bush family for over a century.
- Wedding Cake House: the Gothic revival mansion of ship captain George Bourne in Kennebunk, Maine.

== Maryland ==
- Evergreen House: the mansion of B&O Railroad president John W. Garrett in Baltimore, Maryland.
- Hampton Mansion: the former largest home in America was the home to 7 generations of the Ridgely family in Towson, Maryland
- Homewood: the historical 1800 Federal-style house of Charles Carroll Jr. in Baltimore, Maryland
- Edgar Allan Poe House and Museum, Baltimore, Maryland
- Sagamore Farm: the 1920s horse breeding farm of Alfred G. Vanderbilt II in Baltimore County, Maryland, now home to Under Armour CEO Kevin Plank
- The Cloisters: the 1928 castle of Sumner and Dudrea Parker made from portions of historic estates in America and Europe, located in Lutherville, Maryland.

== Massachusetts ==
- Beauport: the waterfront summer residence of Henry Davis Sleeper in Gloucester, Massachusetts
- Castle Hill: a stately mansion and estate of 21 outbuildings situated in Ipswich, Massachusetts north of Boston; the summer residence of Richard T. Crane Jr.
- Elephant House: the house of Edward Gorey, artist, writer, illustrator, playwright, and puppeteer
- Elm Court: the largest Shingle style architecture house in America was home to William Douglas Sloane and Emily Thorn Vanderbilt in Lenox, Massachusetts
- Hammond Castle: the 1920s stone castle and laboratory of inventor John Hays Hammond Jr. in Gloucester, Massachusetts
- House of the Seven Gables: fictionalized by author Nathaniel Hawthorne in Salem, Massachusetts
- Kennedy Compound: a clapboard (architecture) home located in Hyannis Port, Massachusetts, and the residence of the Kennedy family including American businessman and political figure Joseph P. Kennedy Sr., his wife Rose Fitzgerald Kennedy, and their three sons, U.S. President John F. Kennedy and U.S. Senators Robert F. Kennedy and Ted Kennedy
- Naumkeag: the Shingle Style summer residence of Joseph Hodges Choate in The Berkshires
- Peacefield: a Colonial style mansion and the former residence of U.S. President John Adams, and other members of the Adams family, located in Quincy, Massachusetts near Boston
- The Mount: a country house in Lenox, Massachusetts, the home of noted American author Edith Wharton, who designed the house and its grounds.
- Ventfort Hall: the Jacobean mansion of George and Sarah Morgan which is now the Gilded Age Museum in Lenox, Massachusetts.

== Michigan ==
- Meadow Brook Hall: home of Matilda Dodge Wilson in Rochester Hills, Michigan
- Snowflake: home designed by Frank Lloyd Wright in Plymouth Township, Michigan

== New Hampshire ==
- The Frost Place: home of Pulitzer Prize winning poet Robert Frost in Franconia, New Hampshire, in the White Mountains Region.

== New York ==
- Arden House: the 100,000 sq ft mansion of railroad magnate Edward Henry Harriman in Harriman, New York
- Boldt Castle: legendary island estate, one of America's largest private residences
- Boscobel: the Federal style estate of States Dyckman by the Hudson River in Garrison, New York
- Camp Pine Knot: the earliest of the Great Camps of the Adirondacks, a National Historic Landmark
- Charles W. Goodyear House; home of lawyer and businessman Charles W. Goodyear in Buffalo, New York
- Coindre Hall: the 30,000 square foot mansion of pharmaceutical magnate George McKesson Brown in Huntington, New York
- Coe Hall: the 67-room mansion of William R. Coe in Oyster Bay, New York
- Cornelius Vanderbilt II House: the largest private residence ever constructed in New York City was home to the eldest grandson of tycoon Cornelius Vanderbilt
- Dark Island: fantasy castle by Ernest Flagg "(Singer Castle")
- Eagle's Nest: the residence of William Kissam Vanderbilt II in Centerport, New York, now home to a museum and planetarium
- Edgewater: in Barrytown, New York, built about 1825.
- The Frick Collection: former residence of steel magnate Henry Clay Frick, adjacent Central Park in Manhattan, New York City
- Gracie Mansion: official residence of New York City's mayor
- Grey Gardens, former home of Edith "Big Edie" Ewing Bouvier Beale, cousin of Jacqueline Kennedy Onassis, Edith "Little Edie" Bouvier Beale, Ben Bradlee, former Editor-in-Chief of the Washington Post during the Pentagon Papers and the Watergate scandal and Sally Quinn
- Harriet Phillips Bungalow
- Harbor Hill: the Gold Coast, Long Island estate of Clarence Hungerford Mackay was one of the 10 largest residences in America
- Hempstead House: the massive Gould-Guggenheim estate, and now park, on Long Island's gold coast in Sands Point, New York
- Hyde Park: the Hudson Valley estate of Frederick W. Vanderbilt.
- Indian Neck Hall: a Georgian-style country residence of Frederick Gilbert Bourne located on the Great South Bay in Oakdale, New York
- Inisfada: the huge Tudor Revival mansion of Nicholas Frederic Brady on Long Island
- Kykuit: the residence of oil tycoon John D. Rockefeller in Tarrytown on the Hudson River
- Lower East Side Tenement Museum, a six-story brick tenement building that was home to an estimated 7,000 people, from over 20 nations, between 1863 and 1935, in New York City.
- Mills Mansion: the Beaux-Arts mansion of financier Ogden Mills on the Hudson River in Staatsburg, New York.
- Oheka Castle: also known as the Otto Kahn Estate, it is a large country estate located on the Gold Coast of Long Island's north shore, at Huntington, Suffolk County, New York, and was the residence of financier and philanthropist Otto Kahn
- Petit Chateau: a Châteauesque mansion for William Kissam Vanderbilt and Alva Vanderbilt at 660 Fifth Avenue, New York City
- Red Maples: in the Village of Southampton, New York.
- Rose Hill Mansion: a restored Greek Revival mansion, a National Historic Landmark on Seneca Lake near Geneva, New York
- Sagamore Camp: one of the Great Camps of the Adirondacks, a National Historic Landmark
- Sagamore Hill (House): the home of President Theodore Roosevelt in Cove Neck, New York
- Santanoni Preserve: one of the Great Camps of the Adirondacks, a National Historic Landmark
- Springwood Estate: a Federal and Italianate mansion in Hyde Park, New York; the birthplace, lifelong home, and burial place of Franklin D. Roosevelt; added as a National Historic Site in 1945
- Templeton: the Georgian Revival mansion of Alfred I. du Pont in Brookville, New York, now the DeSeversky Conference Center.
- Westbrook: the Long Island mansion of William Bayard Cutting.
- Winfield Hall: the ornate former residence of Frank Winfield Woolworth on Long Island in Glen Cove, New York

== North Carolina ==
- Biltmore Estate: the largest private home in the United States, built by George Vanderbilt; it is located outside Asheville, North Carolina

== Ohio ==
- Stan Hywet Hall and Gardens: a Tudor Revival country estate and the residence of Frank Seiberling in Akron, Ohio.
- A Christmas Story House
- Franklin Castle
- Hawthorn Hill: Hawthorn Hill in Oakwood, Ohio, was the post-1914 home of Orville Wright.

== Oklahoma ==
- Oklahoma Governor’s Mansion
- Overholser Mansion
- LaQuinta

== Pennsylvania ==
- Belmont Mansion: home of William Peters in Philadelphia, Pennsylvania
- Clayton: the Pittsburgh home of industrialist Henry Clay Frick
- Elstowe Manor: the 60,000 sq ft mansion of William L. Elkins in Elkins Park, Pennsylvania
- Fallingwater: a Frank Lloyd Wright designed house in Bear Run, Pennsylvania
- Grange Estate: Haverford, Pennsylvania, built in 1700, home of patriot John Ross
- Lynnewood Hall: the Neoclassical mansion of industrialist and art collector Peter A. B. Widener in Elkins Park, Pennsylvania
- Edgar Allan Poe National Historic Site, Philadelphia, Pennsylvania
- Whitemarsh Hall: the 100,000 sq ft mansion of Edward T. Stotesbury designed by Horace Trumbauer outside Philadelphia, Pennsylvania.

== Rhode Island ==
- Beechwood: a mansion and the former residence of Caroline Astor in Newport, Rhode Island
- Belcourt Castle: the summer mansion of Oliver Belmont, American banking heir
- Blithewold: an 1896 waterfront mansion and gardens in Bristol, Rhode Island
- The Breakers: Newport, one of the most ambitious residences of the Gilded Age and an architectural landmark
- Carey Mansion: a Châteauesque mansion and the residence of liquor millionaire Edson Bradley in Newport, Rhode Island
- Chateau-sur-Mer: a French villa and the former residence of William Shepard Wetmore in Newport, Rhode Island
- Chepstow: the 1860s Italianate summer home of Edmund Schermerhorn in Newport, Rhode Island
- Hammersmith Farm: A Victorian mansion and estate in Newport, Rhode Island; the residence of Hugh D. Auchincloss and childhood home of Jacqueline Bouvier Kennedy Onassis
- Isaac Bell House: a Shingle style house and "summer cottage" of Isaac Bell Jr. in Newport, Rhode Island
- Kingscote: a Gothic Revival house, museum, and the former residence of George Noble Jones in Newport, Rhode Island
- Marble House: a Beaux-Arts architecture style mansion and residence of William Kissam Vanderbilt in Newport, Rhode Island
- Miramar: a French neoclassical-style mansion and the summer residence of George Dunton Widener in Newport, Rhode Island
- Ochre Court: a large Châteauesque mansion and the residence of Ogden Goelet in Newport, Rhode Island
- The Elms: a Classical Revival mansion and the "summer cottage" of Edward Julius Berwind in Newport, Rhode Island
- Rosecliff: a mansion built for Theresa Fair Oelrichs in Newport, Rhode Island
- Rough Point: an English manorial style mansion and the residence of Frederick William Vanderbilt in Newport, Rhode Island
- Vernon Court: a French classical style "summer cottage" of the young widow of Richard A. Gambrill, Anna Van Nest Gambrill in Newport, Rhode Island.
- Vinland Estate: a Romanesque Revival sandstone mansion built for Catharine Lorillard Wolfe in Newport, Rhode Island.

== Tennessee ==
- Graceland: The former residence of singer Elvis Presley in Memphis, Tennessee

== Texas ==
- Southfork Ranch: a house built by Joe Duncan located near Plano, Texas; setting for the American soap opera Dallas
- Texas Chainsaw House: (now the "Grand Central Cafe and Club Car Bar" restaurant) is a Victorian house now located on the grounds of the Antlers Hotel and was used in the filming of The Texas Chain Saw Massacre during 1973, when it was still in its original location in La Frontera.

== Utah ==
- The Beehive House: built in 1854 by Brigham Young, the house is located in Salt Lake City, Utah. The house gets its name from the beehive sculpture atop the house.
- The Lion House: a second residence built by Brigham Young in 1856. Located in Salt Lake City, Utah, it was built to accommodate his large family due to a polygamous lifestyle. The house's name references a lion statue above the front entrance.

== Vermont ==
- Shelburne Farms: a large farming estate for Dr. William Seward Webb in Shelburne, Vermont

== Virginia ==
- Arlington House (the Custis-Lee Mansion): the home of Robert E. Lee, the grounds of which became Arlington National Cemetery
- Monticello: the personal house of Thomas Jefferson, President of the United States
- Mount Vernon: the residence of President George Washington in Alexandria, Virginia
- Montpelier (Orange, Virginia): the residence of President James Madison and his family.

== Washington ==
- Xanadu 2.0: the sprawling, technologically advanced Earth sheltering home of Bill and Melinda Gates located in the side of a hill overlooking Lake Washington in Medina, Washington.

== Wisconsin ==
- Pabst Mansion: the Flemish Renaissance Revival style mansion of Captain Frederick Pabst in Milwaukee, Wisconsin.

== See also ==
- Architecture of the United States
- List of buildings and structures
- List of Gilded Age mansions
