= National Register of Historic Places listings in St. James Parish, Louisiana =

Location of St. James Parish in Louisiana

This is a list of the National Register of Historic Places listings in St. James Parish, Louisiana.

This is intended to be a complete list of the properties and districts on the National Register of Historic Places in St. James Parish, Louisiana, United States. The locations of National Register properties and districts for which the latitude and longitude coordinates are included below, may be seen in a map.

There are 21 properties and districts listed on the National Register in the parish, including 1 National Historic Landmark. Another two properties were once listed, but have been removed.

This National Park Service list is complete through NPS recent listings posted October 9, 2026.

== Current listings ==
| | Name on the Register | Image | Date listed | Location | City or town | Description |
|---|---|---|---|---|---|---|
| 1 | Bay Tree | Bay Tree | November 21, 1991 (#91001738) | 3785 Louisiana Highway 18; 30°00′11″N 90°46′51″W | Vacherie | |
| 2 | Chauvin House | Chauvin House | July 25, 2003 (#03000681) | 10138 Louisiana Highway 44; 30°05′15″N 90°54′20″W | Convent vicinity | |
| 3 | Colonial Sugars Historic District | Colonial Sugars Historic District | October 11, 1994 (#94000858) | 1250 S. 5th Ave. 30°02′56″N 90°41′01″W | Gramercy | |
| 4 | Desire Plantation House | Desire Plantation House | May 15, 1986 (#86001054) | Louisiana Highway 644; 29°56′39″N 90°41′49″W | Vacherie | Built circa 1835, French Creole perique tobacco plantation. Private. |
| 5 | Felicity Plantation | Felicity Plantation | March 8, 2010 (#10000062) | 3351 Louisiana Highway 18; 30°00′25″N 90°46′22″W | Vacherie | Sister plantation to St. Joseph Plantation, built circa 1850 and privately owned. |
| 6 | Graugnard Farms Plantation House | Graugnard Farms Plantation House | May 14, 1992 (#92000510) | 5825 Louisiana Highway 18; 29°59′28″N 90°50′07″W | St. James | |
| 7 | Lambert House | Lambert House | May 10, 2005 (#05000407) | 5669 Louisiana Highway 44; 29°59′49″N 90°48′46″W | Convent | |
| 8 | Laura Plantation | Laura Plantation | February 3, 1993 (#92001842) | 2247 Louisiana Highway 18; 30°00′21″N 90°43′26″W | Vacherie | Plantation heiress and manager Laura Lacoul Gore's (1861-1963) autobiography Memories of the Old Plantation Home: A Creole Family Album (Nov. 2000) tells the family's history and her experience living at the plantation. Open to the public. |
| 9 | Little Texas | Little Texas | May 14, 1992 (#92000511) | 2834 Louisiana Highway 44; 30°01′21″N 90°43′11″W | Paulina | |
| 10 | Lutcher & Moore Cypress Lumber Co., Ltd., Headquarters Building | Lutcher & Moore Cypress Lumber Co., Ltd., Headquarters Building | May 13, 1994 (#94000411) | 2049 Railroad St. 30°02′25″N 90°41′52″W | Lutcher | |
| 11 | Lutcher United Methodist Church | Lutcher United Methodist Church | February 13, 1992 (#92000042) | 2347 Texas St. 30°02′34″N 90°41′59″W | Lutcher | |
| 12 | Manresa House of Retreats | Manresa House of Retreats | January 31, 1985 (#85000162) | 5858 Louisiana Highway 44; 29°59′34″N 90°49′15″W | Convent | Previously Jefferson College |
| 13 | Mather House | Mather House | May 30, 2001 (#01000569) | 5666 Louisiana Highway 44; 29°59′45″N 90°48′48″W | Convent | |
| 14 | Millet House | Millet House | December 9, 1999 (#99001478) | 423 E. Jefferson Highway; 30°02′40″N 90°41′08″W | Gramercy | |
| 15 | Oak Alley Plantation | Oak Alley Plantation | December 2, 1974 (#74002187) | 2.5 miles (4.0 km) north of Vacherie; 30°00′16″N 90°46′36″W | Vacherie | Property was listed a second time on March 6, 2026. |
| 16 | OLIVE JEANETTE | OLIVE JEANETTE | October 3, 1991 (#91001421) | Main St. 30°02′30″N 90°41′47″W | Lutcher | |
| 17 | Our Lady of Peace Catholic Church | Our Lady of Peace Catholic Church | May 22, 2013 (#13000299) | 13281 LA 644; 29°56′40″N 90°40′56″W | Vacherie | |
| 18 | Pleasant Green Cemetery | | October 9, 2026 (#100013508) | Pleasant Hill Street; 30°03′52″N 90°51′01″W | Romeville | |
| 19 | Judge Felix Poché Plantation House | Judge Felix Poché Plantation House | December 3, 1980 (#80004251) | River Rd. 30°00′44″N 90°49′37″W | Convent | |
| 20 | St. Joseph Plantation House | St. Joseph Plantation House | September 6, 2005 (#05000987) | 3535 Louisiana Highway 18; 30°00′22″N 90°46′20″W | Vacherie | Early 19th-century plantation, joined in 1890 with Felicity Plantation to form the St. Joseph Plantation & Manufacturing Company. Privately owned. |
| 21 | St. Michael's Church Historic District | St. Michael's Church Historic District | November 15, 1979 (#79003121) | Louisiana Highway 44; 30°00′40″N 90°49′31″W | Convent | |

== Former listings ==
| | Name on the Register | Image | Date listed | Date removed | Location | City or town | Description |
|---|---|---|---|---|---|---|---|
| 1 | Colomb House | | August 7, 1980 (#80004250) | January 31, 2019 | Northwest of Convent on River Rd. 30°04′02″N 90°51′24″W | Convent vicinity | |
| 2 | Longview | | September 21, 1983 (#83000537) | January 31, 2019 | Louisiana Highway 44; 30°02′13″N 90°41′52″W | Lutcher | |

== See also ==
- Bagatelle Plantation: an NRHP-listed house from St. James Parish relocated to Iberville Parish
- List of National Historic Landmarks in Louisiana
- National Register of Historic Places listings in Louisiana
