= Valcour Aime =

American sugar planter (1797–1867)

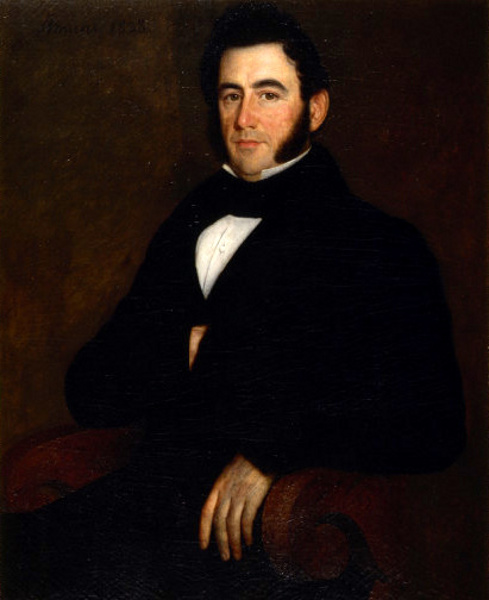
- Portrait by Jacques Amans
- Born: François-Gabriel Aime; 1797; St. Charles Parish, Louisiana, New Spain
- Died: January 1, 1867 (aged 68–69); Saint James Refinery, St. James Parish, Louisiana, U.S.
- Burial place: Saint Louis Cemetery No. 3, New Orleans
- Occupation: Planter
- Spouse: Joséphine Roman (m. 1819)
- Children: Edwige, Joséphine, Félicité "Emma," Felicie, Gabriel

François-Gabriel "Valcour" Aime (1797–1867) was an American sugar planter, slave owner, and was involved in the large-scale refining of sugar. Known as the "Louis XIV of Louisiana," he was reputedly the wealthiest slave owner in the South.

Aime owned a plantation in Vacherie, Louisiana, called the St. James Refinery Plantation, but it became known as Le Petit Versailles due to its size. (The plantation mansion burned down during the Winter of 1916-17)

== Biography ==
François-Gabriel was born in 1797 in St. Charles Parish, Louisiana at the Aime Plantation, to François-Gabriel Aime II (1768-1799) and Marie Félicité Julie Fortier (1778-1806). He was called Valcour by his nurse as a baby and was known by that name for the rest of his life. His father died when he was two years old and his mother six years later. Aime was placed in the charge of his maternal grandfather, Michel Fortier (1750-1819), who raised him.

In 1795, Étienne de Boré had succeeded in granulating sugar and making sugar cane a profitable commodity. Aime inherited the family plantation in St. Charles Parish, and a fortune of $100,000 (~$2.8 million in 2024) in 1818; but he sold his portion of the plantation and bought several other plantations in St. James Parish, where he began the cultivation of sugar cane. By the 1830s, his plantation had grown to 10,000 acres and was the leading sugar producer in the world. Valcour Aime kept a plantation diary from 1823 to 1854 documenting temperature, farming techniques, and various experiments with new varieties of cane and equipment. He is credited with perfecting the vacuum-pan method and was one of the only planters who refined sugar directly from cane juice on site. His technique gave him a competitive edge, made him the richest man in Louisiana, and earned him the title "father of white sugar." His sugar was deemed as best in the world at the 1853 World's Fair in New York. Over his lifetime, this man who lived the life of a "feudal lord" enslaved 233 people, whose births and assignments he documented in his plantation diary, along with their cause of death and purported value.

Valcour Aime was viewed as the very model of a Louisiana grand seigneur. Aime freely spent his wealth in helping the poor and giving donations to religious entities. His slaves sent cart loads of provisions to those in need along the banks of the Mississippi; and in their house were two rooms dedicated exclusively to strangers, and these were never empty. He helped build Jefferson College in Convent, and when it experienced financial difficulties and was on the verge of total collapse, Valcour rescued the complex by purchasing it. Later, he gave the entire college to the Marist Fathers. According to some accounts, his motivation in securing this transfer to a sectarian entity was to prevent the state from obligating the school to open its doors to freed blacks. De Bow's Review Vol. XI, page 437 states, as an alternative explanation, "In 1865, Valcour Aime, who held the greatest part of the shares of the College, being anxious to see the college re-opened, gave his shares to the [priests] that they might conduct the school." Aime also donated to the St. James Catholic Church priceless treasures such as two four-feet-tall solid silver candle holders, an organ, statues of the apostles, and a communion rail. His most valuable gifts were the twelve paintings of the Stations of the Cross and the two large paintings which hang over the side altars, which he commissioned a famous Italian artist to paint.

In 1854, his son Gabriel died from yellow fever, which devastated Valcour. He gave his son-in-law, Florent Fortier, complete authority over the operations of the sugar refinery and withdrew from public life. His wife, and his youngest daughter Félicie, quickly followed Gabriel in death over the next two years and Aime became a virtual recluse. He would spend most of his days and nights on his knees praying, and in reading his Bible and his son's journals.

After attending a Christmas mass, Valcour was caught in a storm on his journey home, and he caught a cold after the temperature plummeted to record lows. His condition did not improve, and Valcour Aime died of pneumonia on January 1, 1867.

== Family ==
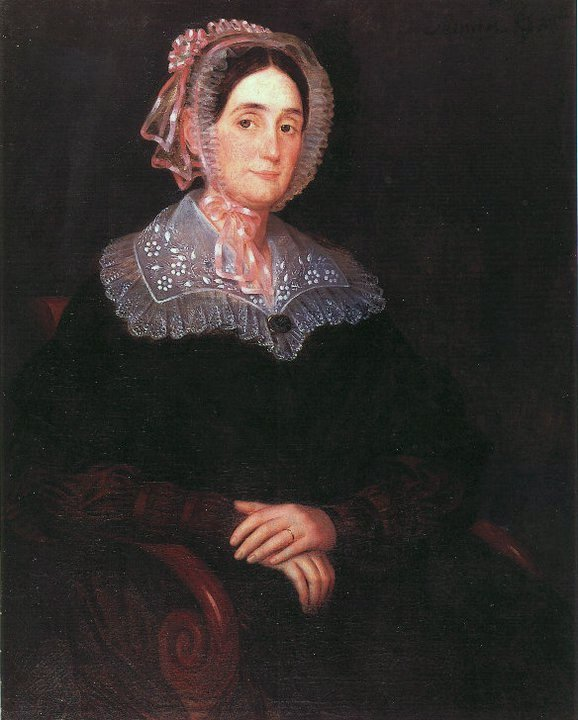
Joséphine Roman, ca. 1838

Valcour Aime married into the wealthy French Creole family of the Romans. In July 1816, he married Joséphine, daughter of Jacques Étienne Roman of Grenoble, France, and Marie-Louise Patin. Her brother was two-time governor of Louisiana, André Bienvenue Roman. Each marrying at the age of 20, Aime and Joséphine went on to have five children.

=== Issue ===
1. Edwige Aime (1819–1867), married her second cousin, Florent Louis Fortier, by whom she had issue. Fortier was the manager of Valcour Aimé's St. James Sugar Refinery.
2. Joséphine Aime (1821–?), married in 1839, Alexis Ferry II, by whom she had issue. Valcour bought the couple St. Joseph Plantation as a wedding gift.
3. Félicité Emma Aime (1823–1905), married her second cousin, Alexandre Septime Fortier, by whom she had issue. Valcour bought the couple Felicity Plantation as a wedding gift.
4. Félicie Aime (1825–1859), married her first cousin, Alfred Roman, son of Governor André Roman, by whom she had issue.
5. Gabriel Aime (1828–1854), youngest and the only son, died unmarried, had no issue.

== Le Petit Versailles ==
=== Mansion ===
In 1836, Valcour Aime exchanged with his wife's brother, Jacques Télesphore Roman, a tract of land for the Romans' house which had been the childhood home of his wife Joséphine. Jacques Roman and his wife began construction on a house the following year which was completed in 1839. They called the plantation Bon Séjour, but due to the alley (French allée) of oaks which had been planted a century before, it became known as Oak Alley Plantation.

With a growing family and a friendly rivalry with his brother-in-law Jacques, Valcour remodeled the Romans' old French Colonial house into a far larger mansion. The new house was a typical double-galleried building with massive columns, but it had wings on each end that enclosed a rear courtyard, creating a very detailed and ornate rear façade. Twin staircases on either side of the courtyard framed the rows of columns within.

The interior of the mansion boasted sixteen rooms, including a grand banquet hall and private children's dining room on the first floor and private parlors, bedrooms, and a library on the second floor. The large central hall contained a solid marble staircase and marble floors. Also, marble of various colors was found throughout the house in mantels, wainscoting, and in the rear courtyard floor.

=== Gardens ===
The gardens were designed on a twenty-acre plot as an English park. It has been suggested that Aime was inspired by Joséphine Bonaparte's English gardens at the Château de Malmaison, and it is said that over 120 enslaved African Americans were forced to create the botanical gardens at Petit Versailles. A large artificial lake filled with exotic fish was built and a stream known as La Riviere was supplied with pumped water from the nearby Mississippi River. Roman bridges spanned the rivulet at various intervals.

A large hill was constructed, covered entirely with violets, with a grotto below used as an icehouse, and on top a crowning Chinese pagoda contained stained-glass windows and chiming bells. A small fort, complete with a cannon, was constructed and came to be known as St. Helene, in honor the island where Napoléon Bonaparte was exiled. Artificial ruins, some detailed with oyster shells and marble statuary, added a decorative flair to the gardens.

Large hothouses were filled with much tropical vegetation, while outside, the landscape was planted with fruit trees, shrubbery, and other plants from exotic locations. A small zoo was installed that included many species of songbirds, peacocks, and even kangaroos. In addition, the plantation's own railroad ran through the gardens to carry guests around the estate.

After the death of Valcour Aime in 1867, the plantation and its finances were in disarray, and the estate was sold to settle debts. Nothing remains of Le Petit Versailles. The mansion burned down around 1920 and the gardens have been taken over by nature, leaving hardly a clue of the mansion that was there before.

== Posthumous honors ==
In 1977, he was honored on a Mardi Gras doubloon as a "great man of Louisiana."
