= Judge Poché Plantation House =

Historic house in Louisiana, United States

- Judge Felix Poché Plantation House
- U.S. National Register of Historic Places
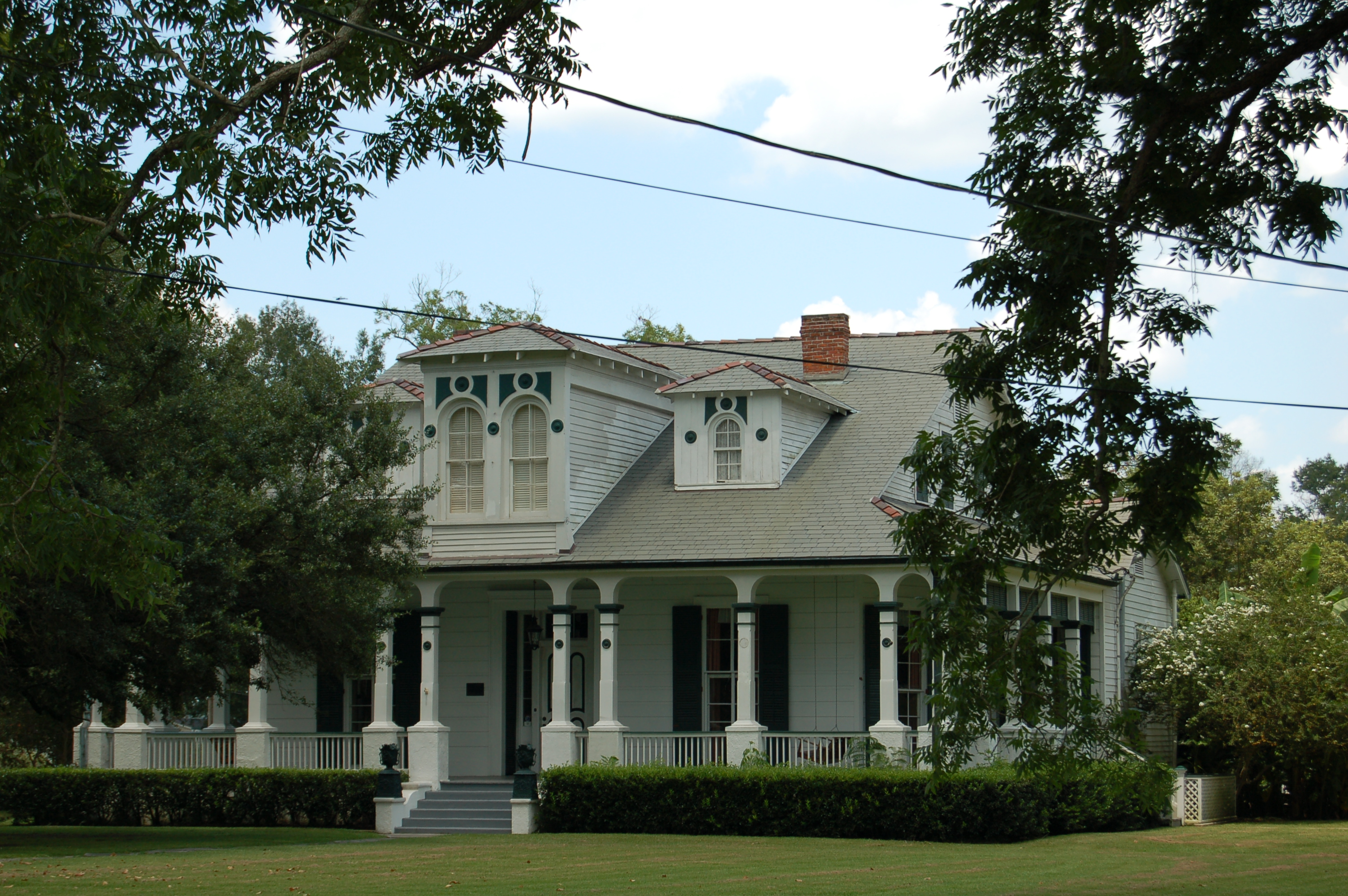

- Location within Louisiana Location within the United States
- Location: River Rd., Convent, Louisiana
- Coordinates: 30°0′44″N 90°49′37″W
- Area: 2 acres (0.81 ha)
- Built: 1870
- Architectural style: Renaissance, Raised plantation house
- NRHP reference No.: 80004251
- Added to NRHP: December 3, 1980

The Judge Felix Poché Plantation House is a historic house in Convent, Louisiana. It was built c. 1870 and placed on the National Register of Historic Places on December 3, 1980. The house's name derives from its ownership by Louisiana Supreme Court Justice Felix Pierre Poché, who was best known for having participated in the founding of the American Bar Association, in 1877–78.

== See also ==
- National Register of Historic Places listings in St. James Parish, Louisiana
