= Desire Plantation House =

Historic house in Louisiana, United States

- Desire Plantation
- U.S. National Register of Historic Places
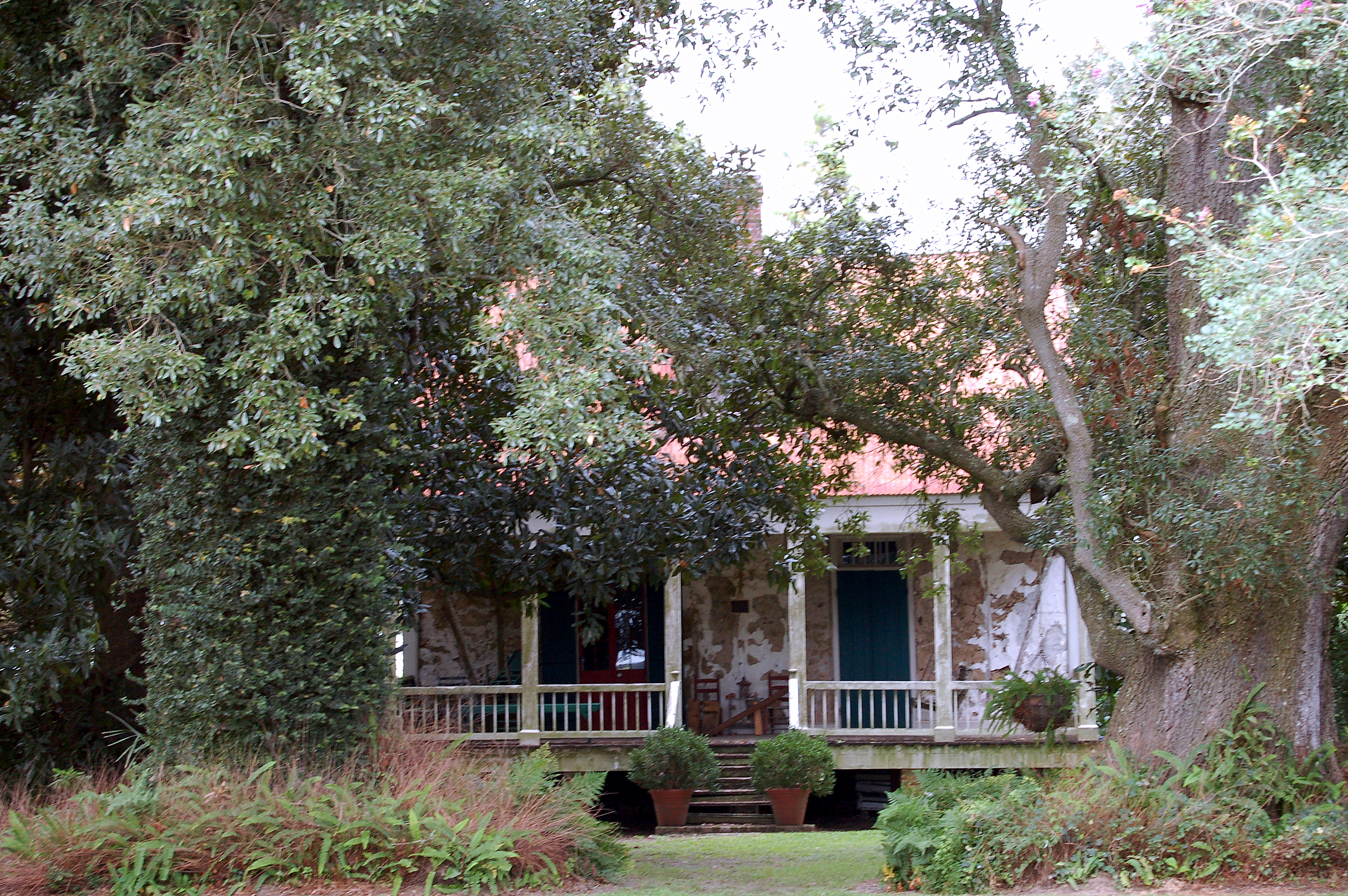

- Location within Louisiana Location within the United States
- Nearest city: Vacherie, Louisiana
- Coordinates: 29°56′39″N 90°41′32″W
- Built: 1835
- Architectural style: French Creole
- NRHP reference No.: 86001054
- Added to NRHP: 15 May 1986

Desire plantation, also known as Alcidesire, is an historic Perique tobacco plantation built circa 1835, and located in Vacherie, Louisiana, St. James Parish. The plantation house was listed on the National Register of Historic Places in 1986.

== History ==
Desire LeBlanc was born in 1831, the son of Dominique LeBlanc and Perosine Bourgeois. He married Aglaé Bourgeois in 1854 and had a daughter, Alcidie LeBlanc, in the same year.

In April 1885, Alcidie married Louis S. Webre, who bought the Bellevue (Belleview) Plantation located on Bayou Grosse Tete in Iberville Parish. They had a son, Joseph M. Webre, in 1888.

== See also ==
- National Register of Historic Places listings in St. James Parish, Louisiana
- List of plantations in Louisiana
