= Felix Pierre Poché =

American judge (1836–1895)

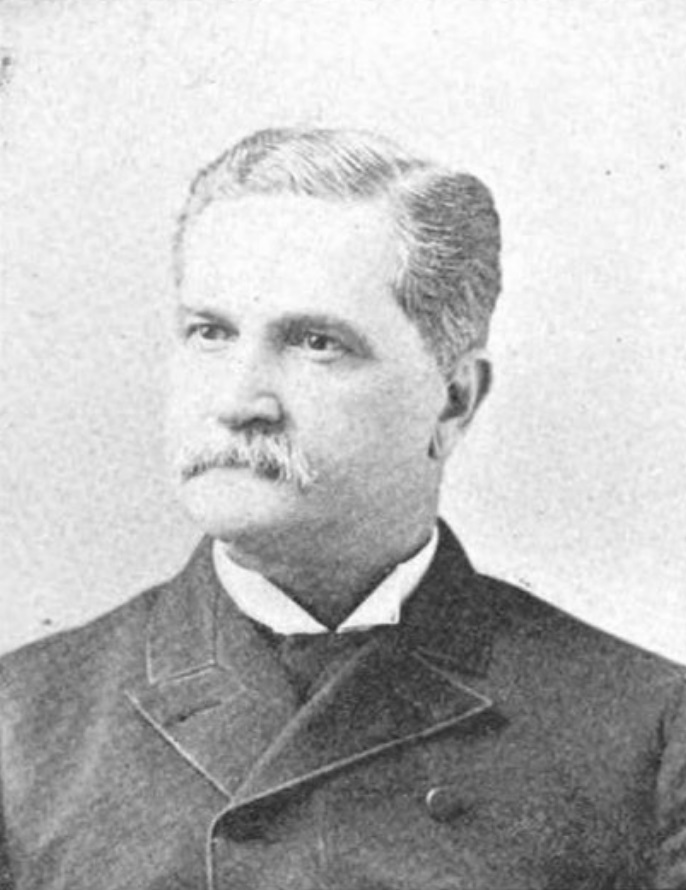
- Felix Pierre Poché

Justice of the Louisiana Supreme Court
- In office April 5, 1880 – April 5, 1890

Personal details
- Born: May 18, 1836 St. James Parish, Louisiana
- Died: June 21, 1895 (aged 59) New Orleans, Louisiana, U.S.
- Education: St. Joseph's College, Bardstown, Kentucky
- Occupation: Lawyer, Justice
- Profession: Attorney, Judge

Felix Pierre Poché (May 18, 1836 – June 21, 1895) was a justice of the Louisiana Supreme Court from April 5, 1880, to April 5, 1890.

Born in St. James Parish, Louisiana to a family of French Acadian origin, Poché was educated at the public schools of Louisiana until he reached the age of sixteen, and was then sent to St. Joseph's College at Bardstown, Kentucky, and after leaving that school in 1855 he remained for a time in Bardstown, reading law in the office of former Governor Charles A. Wickliffe. After having been admitted to the bar of Kentucky, he went to Louisiana and continued his legal studies in the office of Judge Roman of Thibidiaux, in the Parish of Lafourche, and was admitted to the bar of Louisiana in 1859. The following year he returned to St. James Parish and begun practice.

Poché served in the Confederate Army during the American Civil War, entering the service as Captain of Infantry in June, 1862. After the war, he was prominent in state politics, being elected to the Louisiana State Senate in 1866, and serving in the Constitutional Convention of 1879 which restricted voting by freedmen. In 1878, Poché was one of the founders and charter members of the American Bar Association, and was a vice-president of that organization for eight years. In 1880, Poché was appointed the senior associate justice of the newly reconstituted Louisiana Supreme Court for a term of ten years. His retention in office "was urged by the people of the whole State, in testimonials never before showered on any judge in the history of the State", but he was not appointed to another term.

He died at New Orleans. His former home, the Judge Poché Plantation House, was later placed on the National Register of Historic Places. He was a member of The Boston Club of New Orleans

Political offices
Preceded by Newly reconstituted court.	Justice of the Louisiana Supreme Court; 1880–1890	Succeeded by Joseph A. Breaux
