= Olive Jeanette =

- U.S. National Register of Historic Places
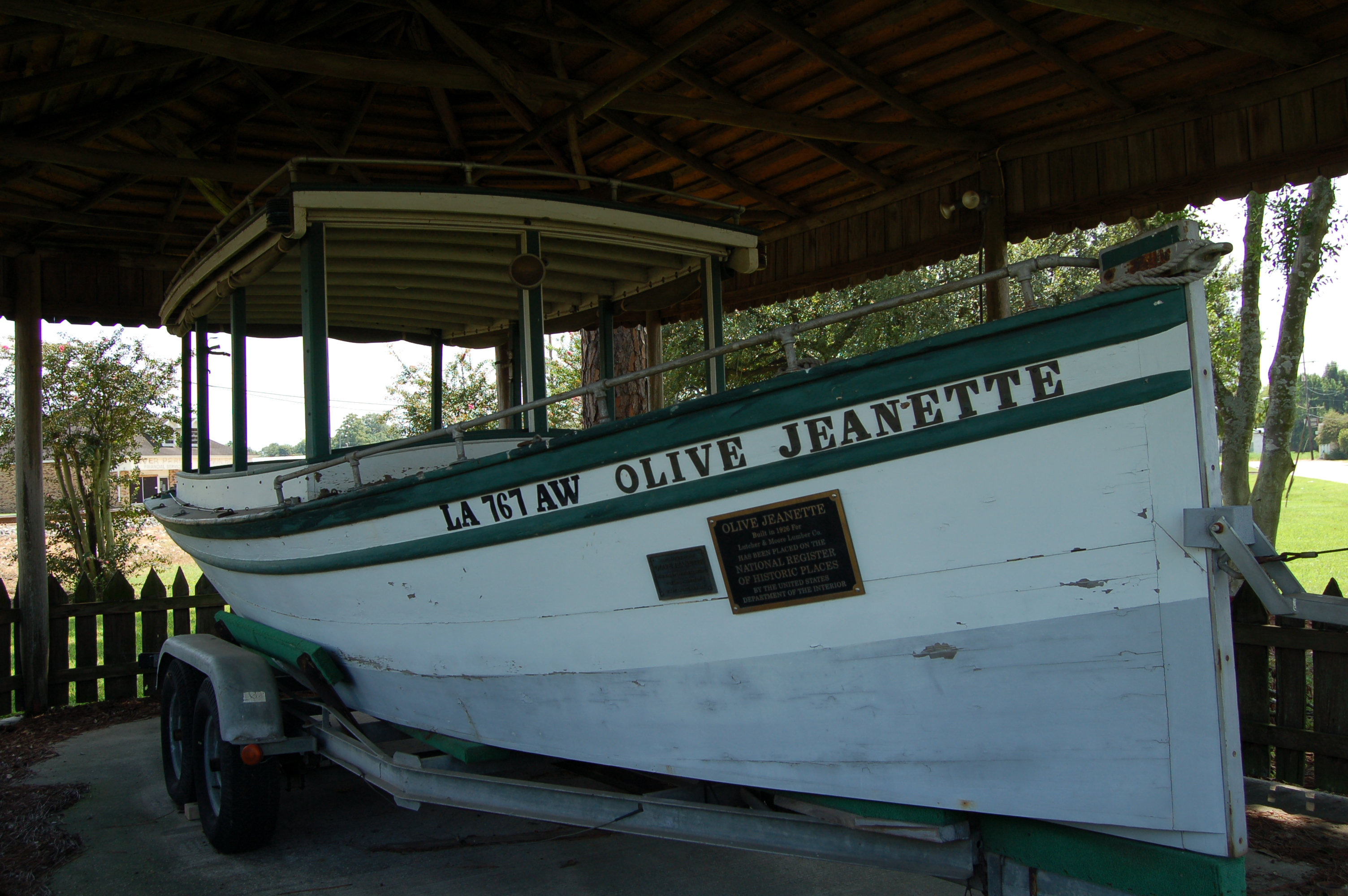

- Location within Louisiana Location within the United States
- Location: Main Street; Lutcher, Louisiana
- Coordinates: 30°2′30″N 90°41′47″W
- Area: less than one acre
- Built: 1930
- Built by: Horace Hebert
- Architectural style: Fur-trapping boat
- NRHP reference No.: 91001421
- Added to NRHP: October 3, 1991

The Olive Jeanette is a twenty-four-foot cypress vessel built in 1926 by Lutcher and Moore Cypress Lumber Company. It was placed on the National Register of Historic Places on October 3, 1991.

== See also ==
- Olive Jeanette (schooner-barge): unrelated ship sunk in 1905
- National Register of Historic Places listings in St. James Parish, Louisiana
