= George T. Oubre =

American politician

Member of the Louisiana State Senate
- In office 1968–1972

Personal details
- Born: George Telesmar Oubre; February 22, 1918 Vacherie, Louisiana, U.S.
- Died: May 28, 1998 (aged 80) Vacherie, Louisiana, U.S.
- Party: Democratic
- Education: Tulane University Law School

George Telesmar Oubre Sr. (February 22, 1918 – May 28, 1998) was an American politician. A member of the Democratic Party, he served in the Louisiana State Senate from 1968 to 1972.
