= St. Michael's Church Historic District =

Historic church in Louisiana, United States

- U.S. National Register of Historic Places
- U.S. Historic district
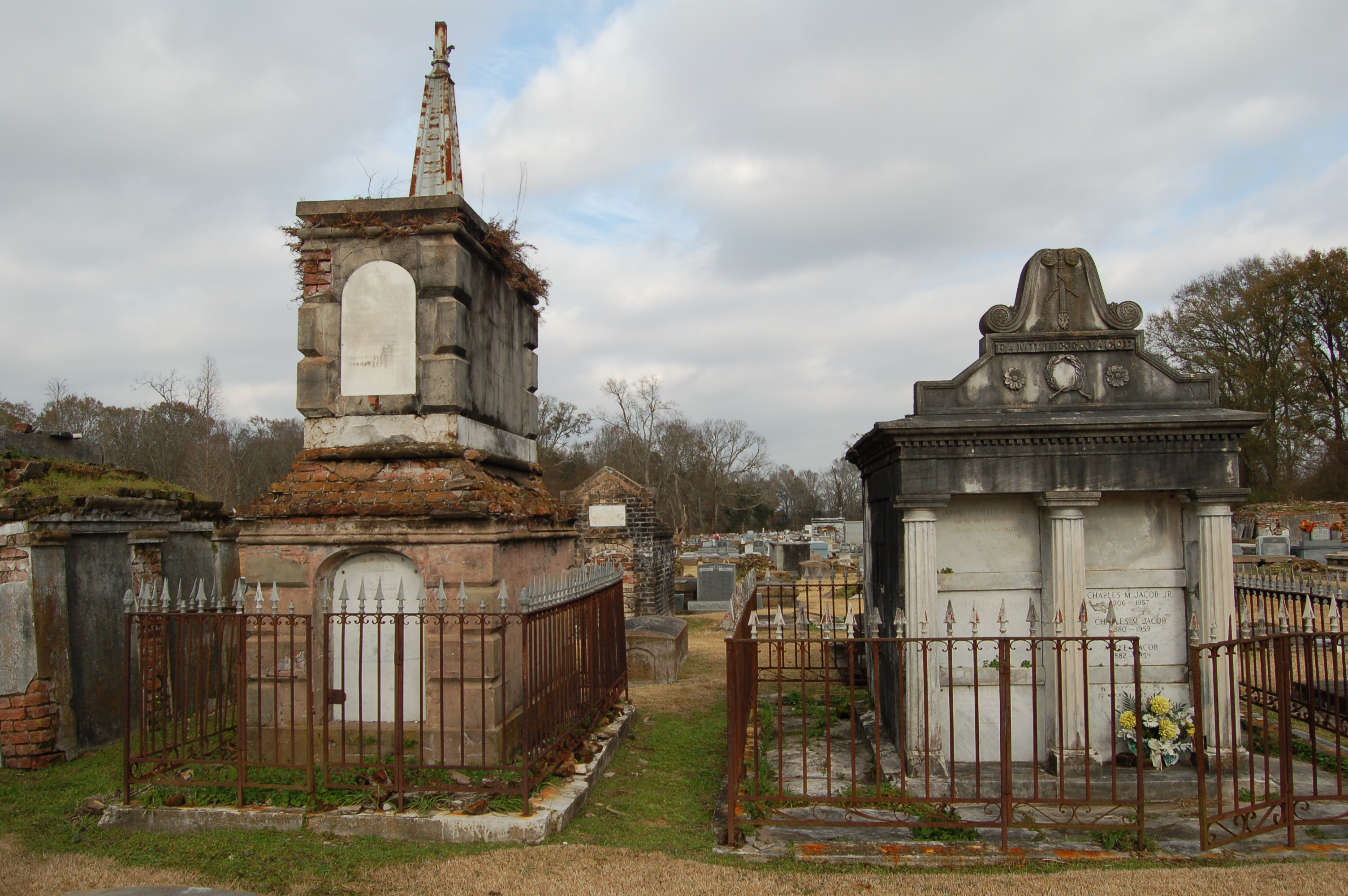

- Location within Louisiana Location within the United States
- Location: LA 44, Convent, Louisiana
- Coordinates: 30.01005°N 90.82705°W
- Area: 23 acres (9.3 ha)
- Built: 1833
- Architectural style: Greek Revival, Late Victorian
- NRHP reference No.: 79003121
- Added to NRHP: November 15, 1979

St. Michael's Church Historic District is a historic district in Convent, Louisiana, in St. James Parish, Louisiana. The area was added to the National Register of Historic Places in 1979.

It is located on River Road (Louisiana Highway 44), about 7 miles (11 km) downriver from Sunshine Bridge. It included six contributing buildings and a contributing site on 23 acres (9.3 ha).

It includes:

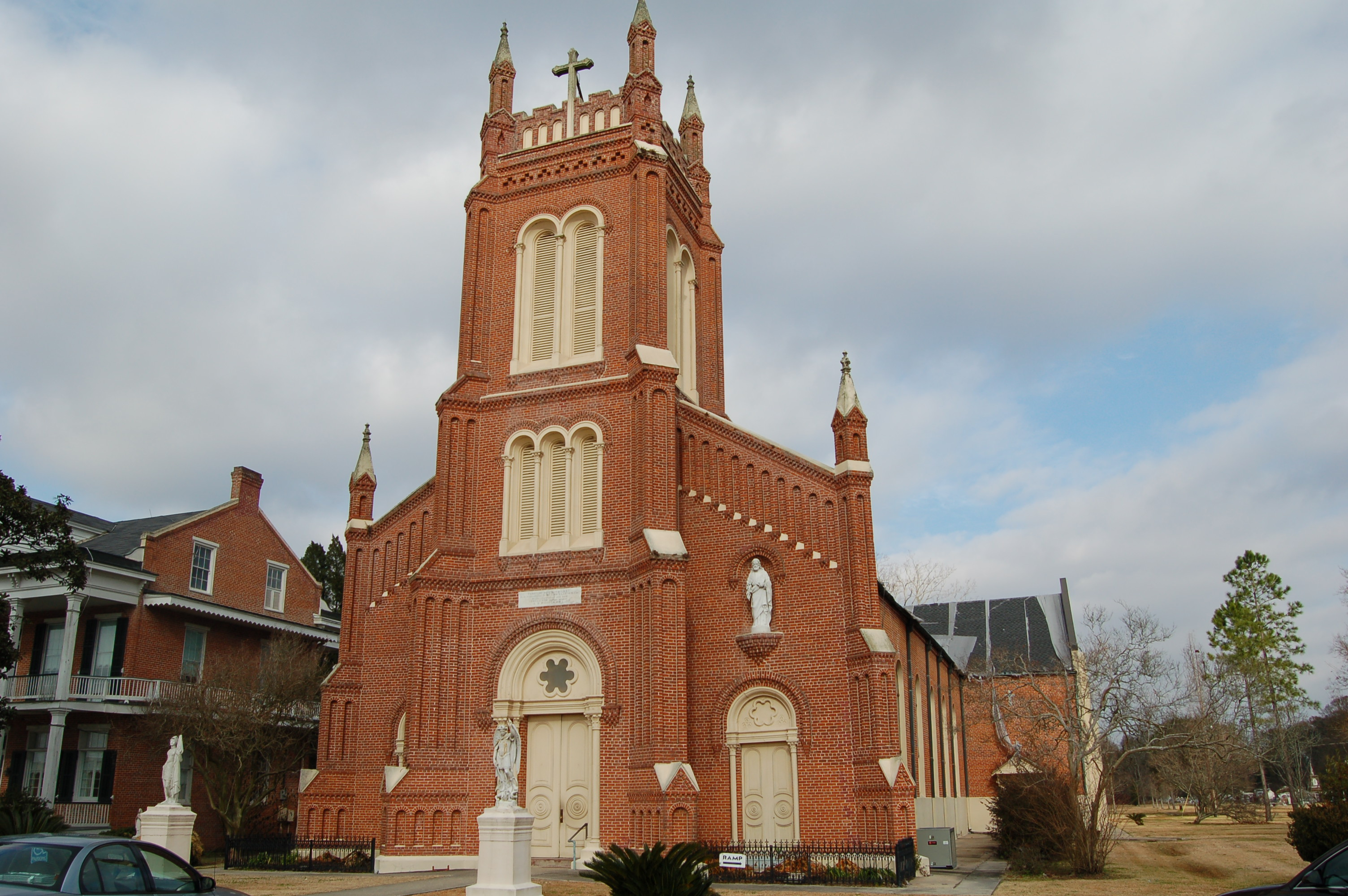
St. Michael's Church

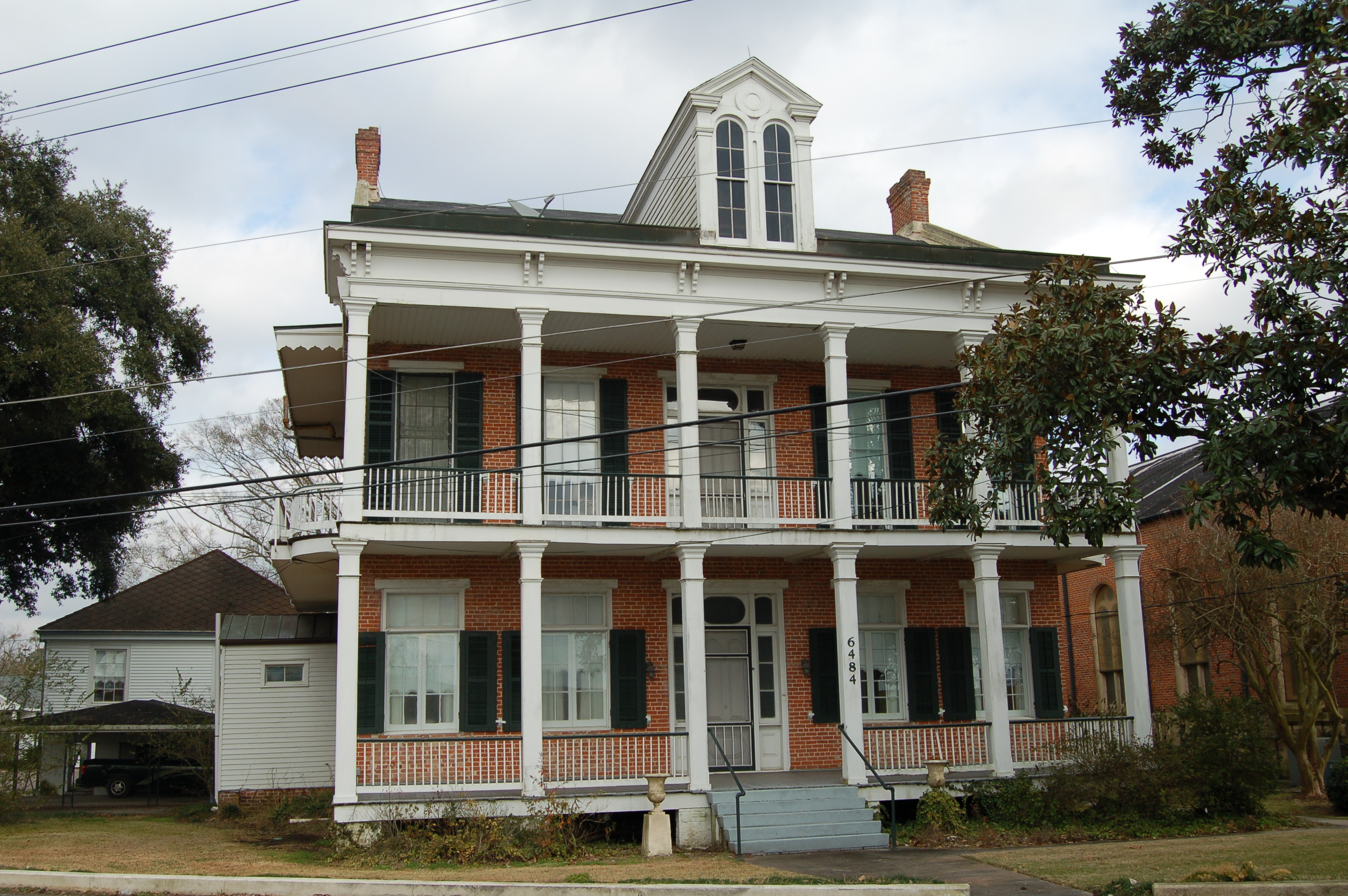
Rectory

- St. Michael's Church (c. 1875), a cruciform basilica with a tower in Gothic Revival and Romanesque styles. It has a "five bay, aisled nave, and a massive altar set in a great niche whose back wall is cut through with a colonnade screen. The church is entered through a vestibule set in the base in a single central tower. In the ornate nave, multishaft columns rise to foliated capitals which support sets of Romanesque double arches. The exposed truss roof features King posts and foliated hanging pendants. The building is constructed of brick laid up in common bond. The exterior features the verticality, pinnacles, buttresses, and multiple arches of the Gothic style. Yet the numerous semicircular arches and blind arcading are Romanesque. Despite the mixture of styles, the blend is entirely harmonious and elegant. At one time there was an octagonal spire; however, it was blown down in the 1975 hurricane."
- a rectory
- a large school building, "the old St. Michael's School for white children, which operated from 1940 to about 1966. From 1966 to 1971 it was an integrated Catholic school."
- a small school building, "the old St. Joseph's School for Negroes, which originally occupied a different site. The school began in 1867 and operated until the coming of integration to the parish in the late 1960s. The building, which dates from the middle to late nineteenth century, was moved to the church grounds in 1932 and continued to function as a Negro Catholic school. It may be the same building in which the school was inaugurated in 1867."
- two cottages
- "the Shed"
- a cemetery "consisting mainly of fairly ordinary above-ground tombs ... noteworthy for three high style Renaissance Revival tombs near the entrance. The Welham tomb is particularly significant with its castiron vermiculated quoins and arches."
