= Felicity Plantation =

Human settlement in United States of America

- U.S. National Register of Historic Places
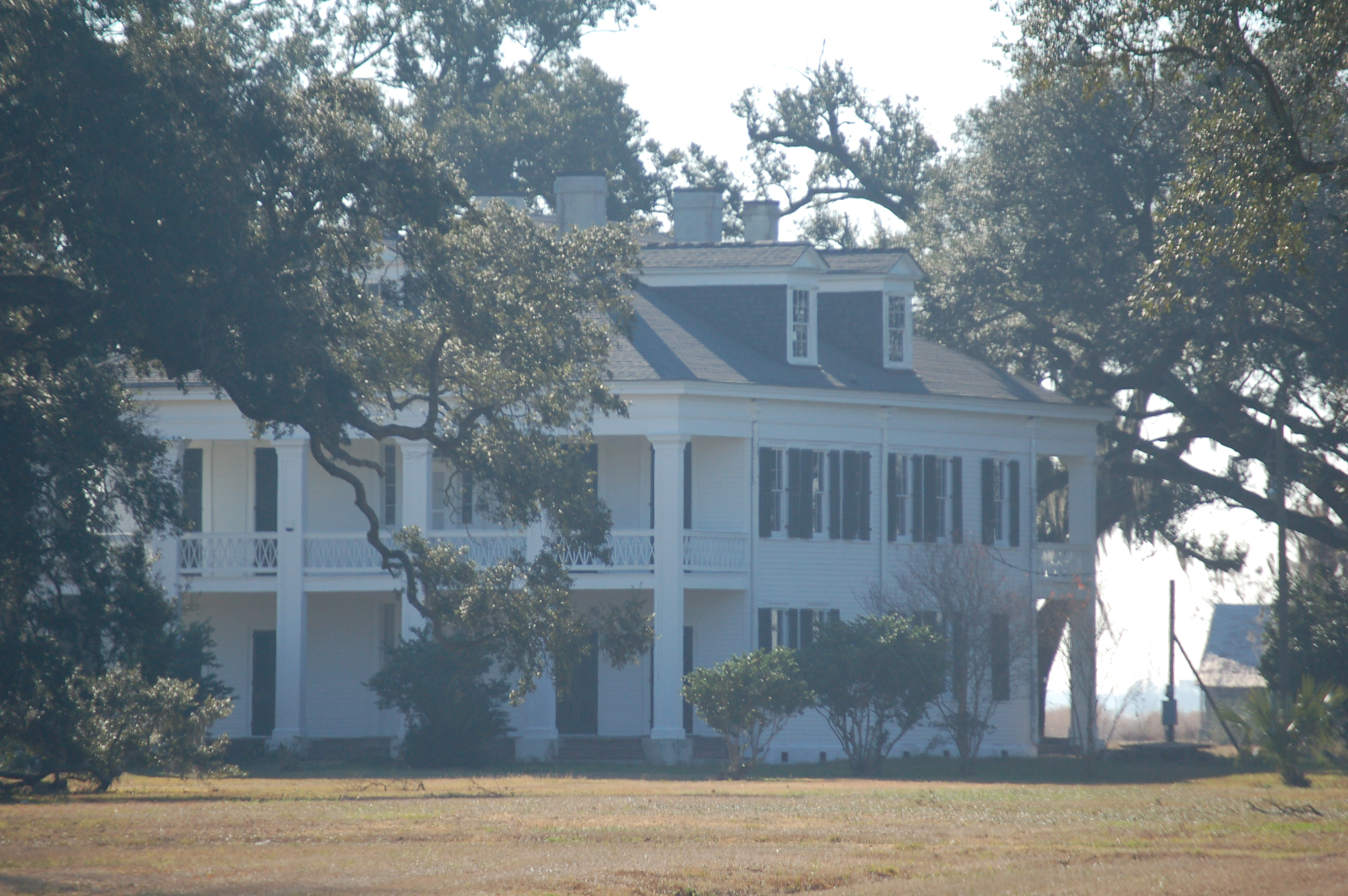
- The plantation house in 2010

- Location within Louisiana
- Location: 3351 Louisiana Highway 18; Vacheria, Louisiana
- Coordinates: 30°0′25″N 90°46′22″W
- Built: 1846
- NRHP reference No.: 10000062
- Designated: March 8, 2010

Felicity Plantation is a historic sugarcane plantation on the banks of the Mississippi River in the U.S. state of Louisiana. It is located along Louisiana Highway 18 in Vacherie, St. James Parish. Felicity is a sister plantation to St. Joseph Plantation, and was built around 1846 (or 1850) by Valcour Aime as a wedding gift to his daughter, Felicite Emma, and her spouse, Septime Fortier, who was also her cousin. Acquired by a bank in 1873, the plantation was purchased by Saturnine Waguespack in 1890, who merged it with the St. Joseph Plantation to form the St. Joseph Plantation and Manufacturing Company. The house still remains in the Waguespack family.

== Architecture ==
The antebellum plantation house has elements of French Colonial and Anglo-American styles. It is characterized by its wide hallways and high-ceilinged rooms, while featuring a carved cypress balustrade. Several of the rooms contain red Italian marble mantlepieces. Six wooden pillars are large in size and square in shape. The house was damaged during Hurricane Katrina in 2005 and has since been restored.

== Grounds ==
The grounds still contain an original barn and slave quarters houses.

== In film ==
Several films have used the plantation as a location, including The Skeleton Key (2005) and 12 Years a Slave (2013), along with Season One of the WGN television series, Underground.

== See also ==
- List of plantations in Louisiana
- National Register of Historic Places listings in St. James Parish, Louisiana
