= Joseph Arsenne Breaux =

American judge (1838–1926)

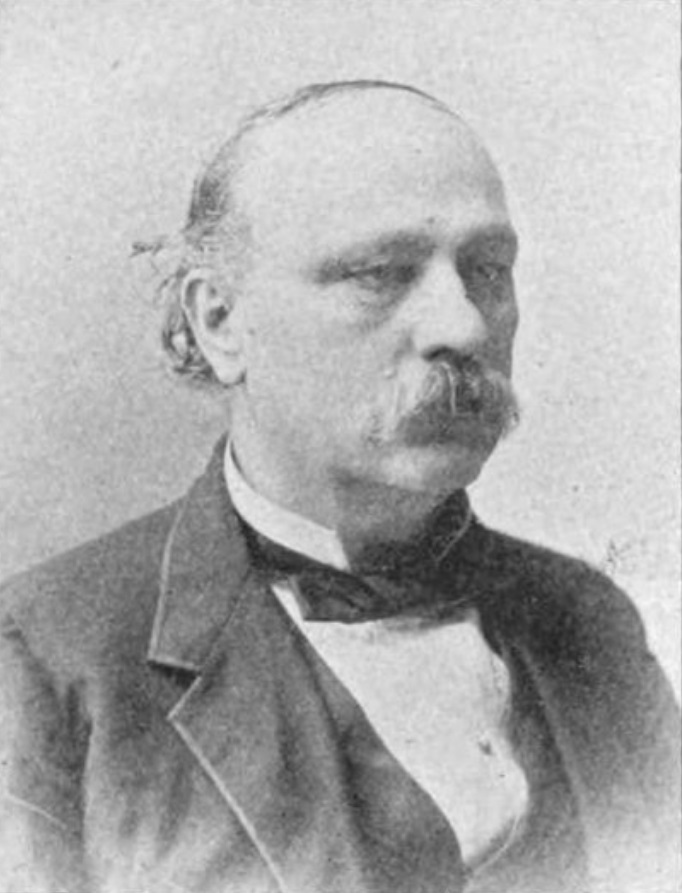
Joseph Arsenne Breaux

Joseph Arsenne Breaux (February 18, 1838 – July 26, 1926) was an associate justice of the Louisiana Supreme Court from 1890 to 1904, serving as chief justice from 1904 to 1914, and a reformer in education.

Breaux was of Acadian (Cajun) descent. He was the son of Jean Baptiste Breaux and his wife, the former Margaret Walsh, who was raised by Comeaux. He was born on the family plantation in Bayou Goula Iberville Parish, Louisiana a thriving town in the early 19th century. He studied at Georgetown College in Kentucky and then at Tulane University, graduating from the later in 1859. In 1861 he married Eugenie Mille, the daughter of Thomas Mille from Iberville Parish.

Breaux joined the Confederate States of America and fought in the American Civil War. He eventually reached the rank of lieutenant in the Confederate States Army. After the rebellion was put down in 1865, he moved to Lafayette and then in 1867 to New Iberia, Louisiana where he was the first lawyer in the new parish.

In New Iberia, Breaux became a prominent citizen as the founder and president of the city's First National Bank until 1922 and as president of the New Iberia School Board. In 1888 he was elected Louisiana State Superintendent of Schools. He navigated a school law through the Louisiana State Legislature while in this position.

In 1890, Governor Francis T. Nicholls appointed him to the Louisiana Supreme Court. In 1902, Breaux was reacquainted with Acadians from Canada at a meeting in Waltham, Massachusetts, with whom he developed some ties. In 1904 he became the court's chief justice. He served on the court until 1914. He was the compiler of a collection of laws called Breaux's Digest and historians suspect that he was a co-author of the Ditchy Manuscript which he left in his will to the Louisiana State Museum. He was a philanthropist for Charity Hospital, Louisiana State Museum, Tulane Medical School and Tulane Law School, Loyola Law School, and Evangeline Longfellow State Park.

Judge Breaux was married to Eugenie Milles, daughter of Thomas Milles and Pauline Dupuy on April 12, 1861 in Plaquemine, Iberville. Her parents were Thomas and Pauline, who died in the hurricane that swept Isle Derniere on August 10, 1856. Dr. Duperrier from New Iberia had married her oldest sister so they finally moved to New Iberia. The Breauxs did not have any children.

== Sources ==
- Dictionary of American Biography. Vol. 2, p. 3.

Political offices
Preceded by Felix Pierre Poché	Justice of the Louisiana Supreme Court; 1890–1914	Succeeded by Charles Austin O'Niell
