= Jacques Telesphore Roman =

American planter

- Born: March 22, 1800; Opelousas, Louisiana
- Died: April 11, 1848 (aged 48); Vacherie, Louisiana
- Spouse: Joséphine Thérèse
- Children: 6
- Relatives: André B. Roman (brother)

Jacques Telesphore Roman (March 22, 1800 – April 11, 1848) was a Louisiana Creole businessman and sugar planter. He was the builder of the Oak Alley Plantation.

== Early years ==
Born near Opelousas, Louisiana, the son of Jacques Etienne Roman of Grenoble, France, and Marie Louise Patin, Jacques Telesphore Roman and his family later moved to St. James Parish and engaged in the lucrative sugar trade.

As the Roman family achieved greater prominence as leaders in society, their activities alternated between their sugar plantations in St. James Parish and in New Orleans. Among the latter was the house now known as Madame John's Legacy on Rue Dumaine – which was purchased by Jacques Etienne's widow for herself and her bachelor sons shortly after her husband's death. From here Jacques Telesphore Roman began his courtship of Marie Joséphine Thérèse Célina Pilie, whose prominent family lived around the corner on Royal Street. They were married on June 14, 1834.

== Oak Alley ==
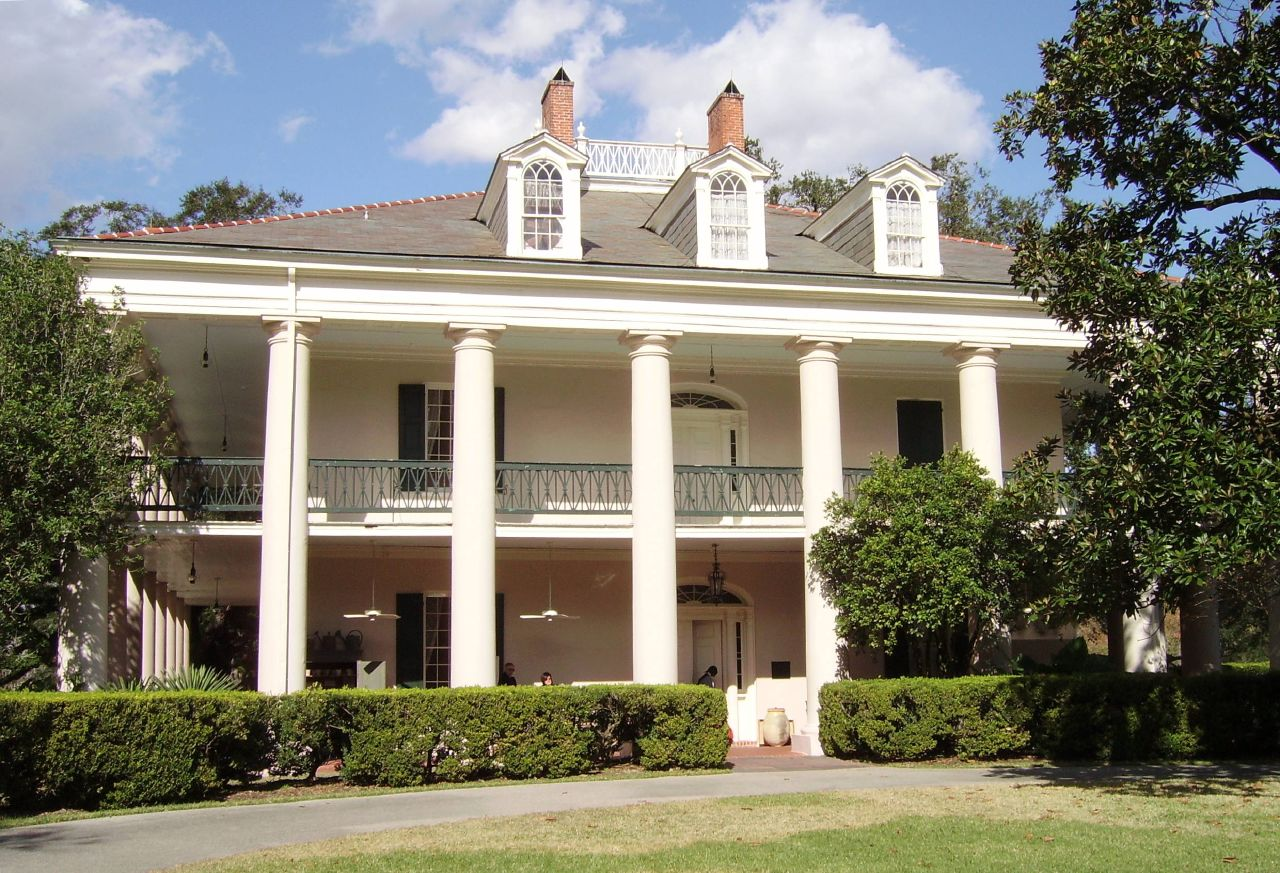
Oak Alley Plantation mansion

At this point, the fortunes of the Roman family had reached their pinnacle. Jacques' brother Andre was serving his first term as Governor of Louisiana, and his sister Josephine, was married to Francois Gabriel "Valcour" Aime, whose wealth, interest in the sugar industry, and opulent lifestyle had won him the title of "Sugar King Of Louisiana." On May 19, 1836, Valcour Aime sold Jacques T. Roman the plantation which riverboat captains later dubbed "Oak Alley."

In keeping with the standards of the elite of that period, Jacques and Celina plunged with enthusiasm into the building of their own mansion on their newly acquired plantation. The architect is believed to have been Celina's father, Gilbert Joseph Pilie. Master builder George Swainy was contracted to direct the construction, which took over two years to complete.

== Death ==
Roman died from tuberculosis in 1848. He was buried in the St. James Catholic Cemetery, but his wife later moved his body to St. Louis Cemetery No. 3 in New Orleans. Without any experience in business or sugarcane farming, his widow Celina Roman took over management of the plantation. Mixing her lack of experience with her penchant for opulent spending, Celina drove the plantation into near bankruptcy.

Her only surviving son, Henri Roman, assumed responsibility for family affairs in 1859. His efforts to preserve the position and holdings of the family failed — against the overwhelming economic and political turmoil resulting from the Civil War and Reconstruction. The Romans joined the ever-growing tide of once powerful and proud Creoles caught in a downhill slide toward oblivion.
