= Laura Plantation =

Historic house in Louisiana, United States

Coordinates: 30.008730°N 90.725328°W

- U.S. National Register of Historic Places
- U.S. Historic district
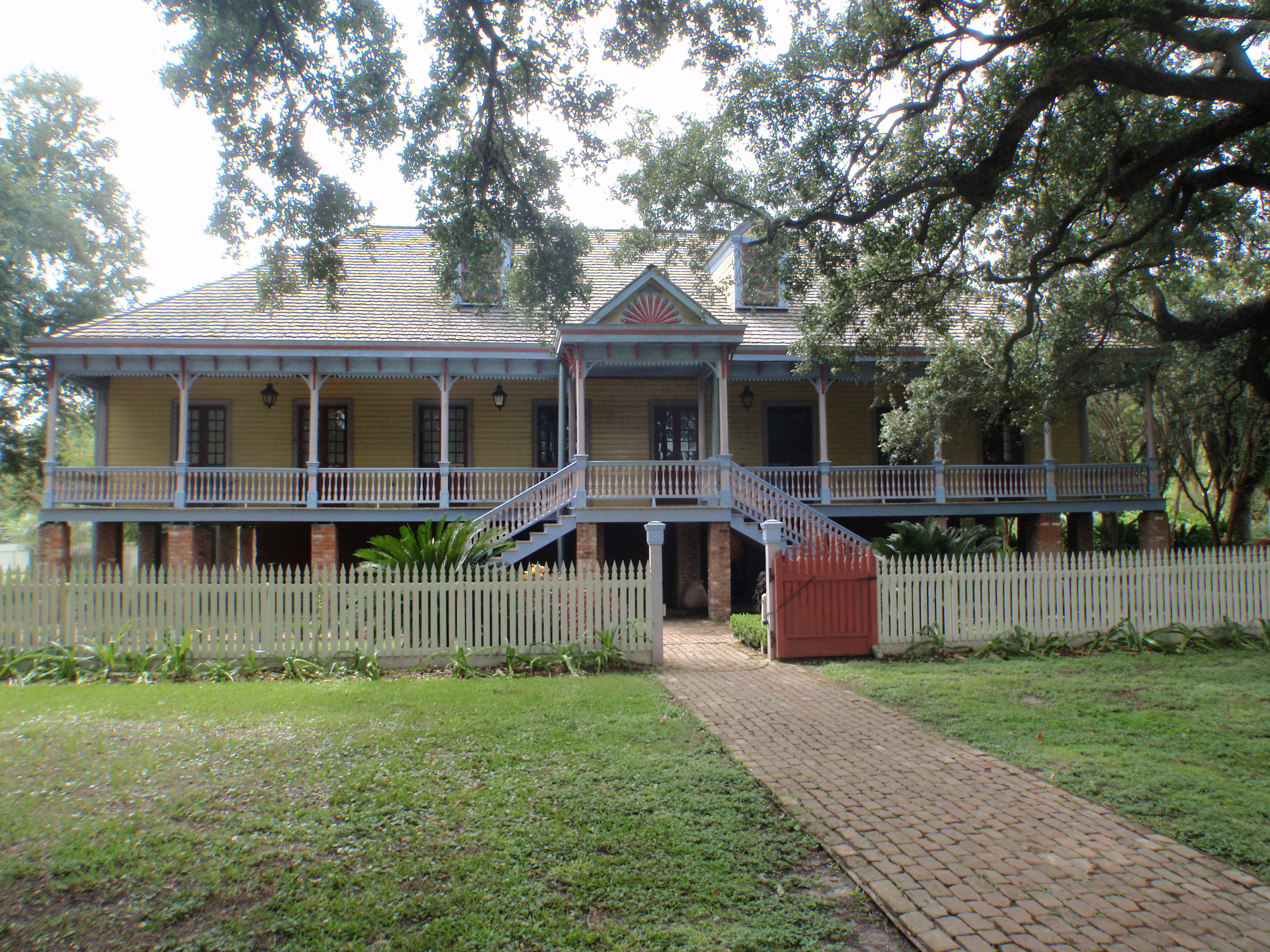
- Laura Plantation house in 2011 after restoration

- Location within Louisiana Location within the United States
- Nearest city: Vacherie, Louisiana
- Area: 37 acres (15 ha)
- Built: 1805
- Architectural style: Creole
- Website: Laura Plantation
- MPS: Louisiana's French Creole architecture MPS
- NRHP reference No.: 92001842
- Added to NRHP: February 3, 1993

Laura Plantation is a restored historic Louisiana Creole plantation on the west bank of the Mississippi River in Vacherie, Louisiana. Formerly known as Habitation Duparc, it is significant for its early 19th-century Créole-style raised big house and several surviving outbuildings, including four slave cabins. It is one of only 15 plantation complexes in Louisiana with this many complete structures. Due to its historical importance, the plantation is on the National Register of Historic Places. The site, in St. James Parish, Louisiana, is also included on the Louisiana African American Heritage Trail.

Alcée Fortier, who later became Professor of Romance Languages and folklore at Tulane University, was said to have collected Louisiana Creole versions of the West African Br'er Rabbit stories here in the 1870s.

The parents and family of U.S. singer-songwriter Fats Domino ("Blueberry Hill") had lived on the plantation.

== Architecture ==
Shaded by the low branches of large oak trees, the main house is almost hidden from the road. Constructed in 1804–1805, the "big house" at Laura Plantation has a raised brick basement story and a briquette-entre-poteaux (brick between posts) upper floor. Much of the house was pre-fabricated, as its wooden beams were pre-cut off-site and arrived ready to be installed. It is one of only 30 substantial Créole raised houses in the state. Also noteworthy are the Federal-style interior woodwork and Norman roof truss, unusual for later Créole houses.

The floor plan consists of two rows of five rooms that all open directly into each other without any hallways. The interior of the "big house" is furnished with original antiques. Some pieces were donated to the plantation by families of the original owners. Owners have left some areas inside the home unrestored to give visitors a sense of history and show wall-construction methods.

The remaining plantation complex consists of the "big house" with several outbuildings, including four original slave cabins, and a maison de reprise (a second house, or mother-in-law cottage). The existence of the slave quarters, where farm workers continued to live until 1977, contributes to the historic significance of the complex. Because of its importance, it has been listed on the U.S. National Register of Historic Places. The complex is used to interpret history and for heritage tourism.

== History ==
=== Background ===
In the early 1700s, a large Acolapissa village called Tabiscanja, meaning "long river view," was located on high ground above the Mississippi River in this area. In 1785, Acadian refugees settled on the site.

=== Duparc and Locoul families ===
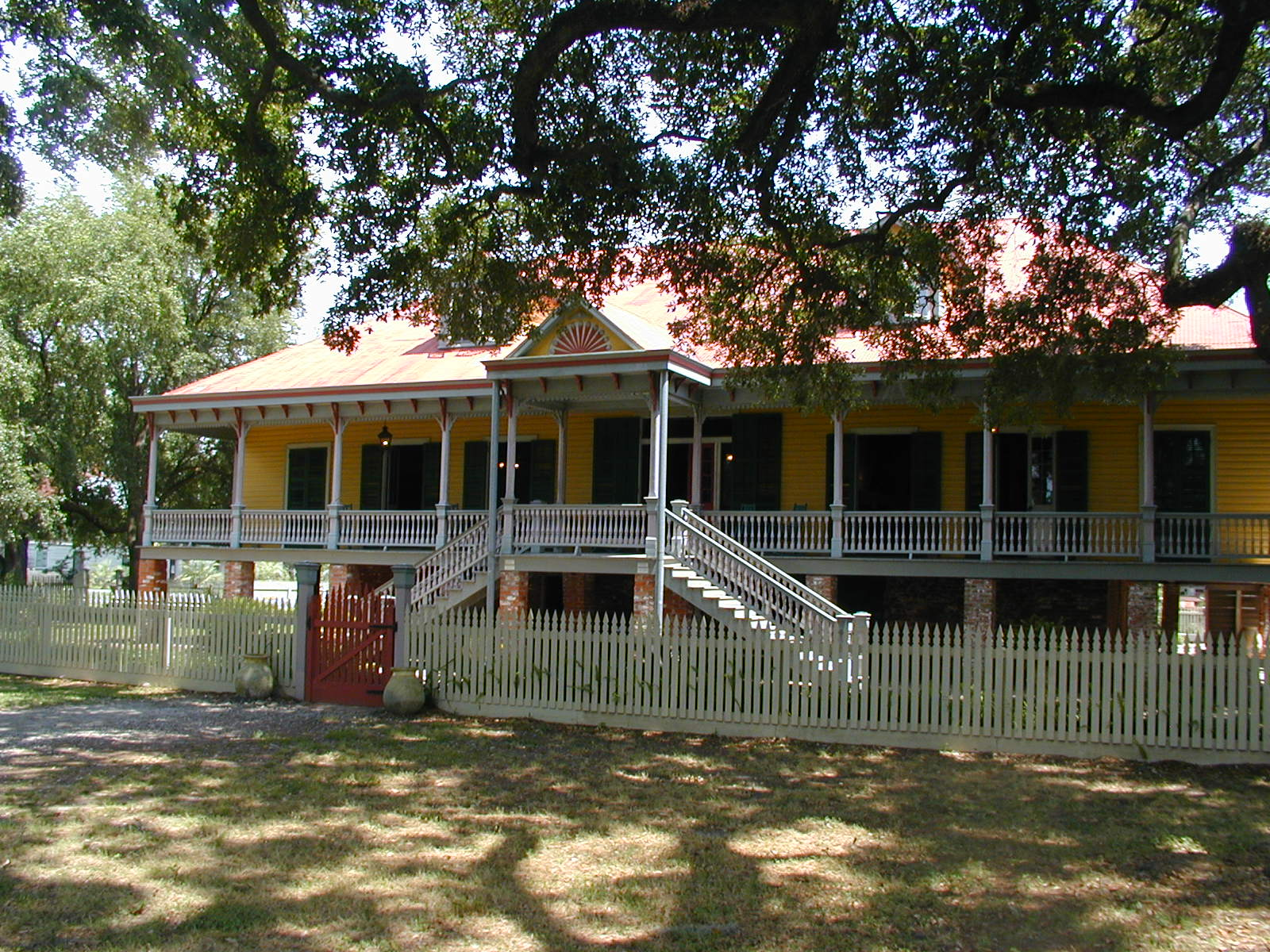
Front of the big house, painted in multiple colors.

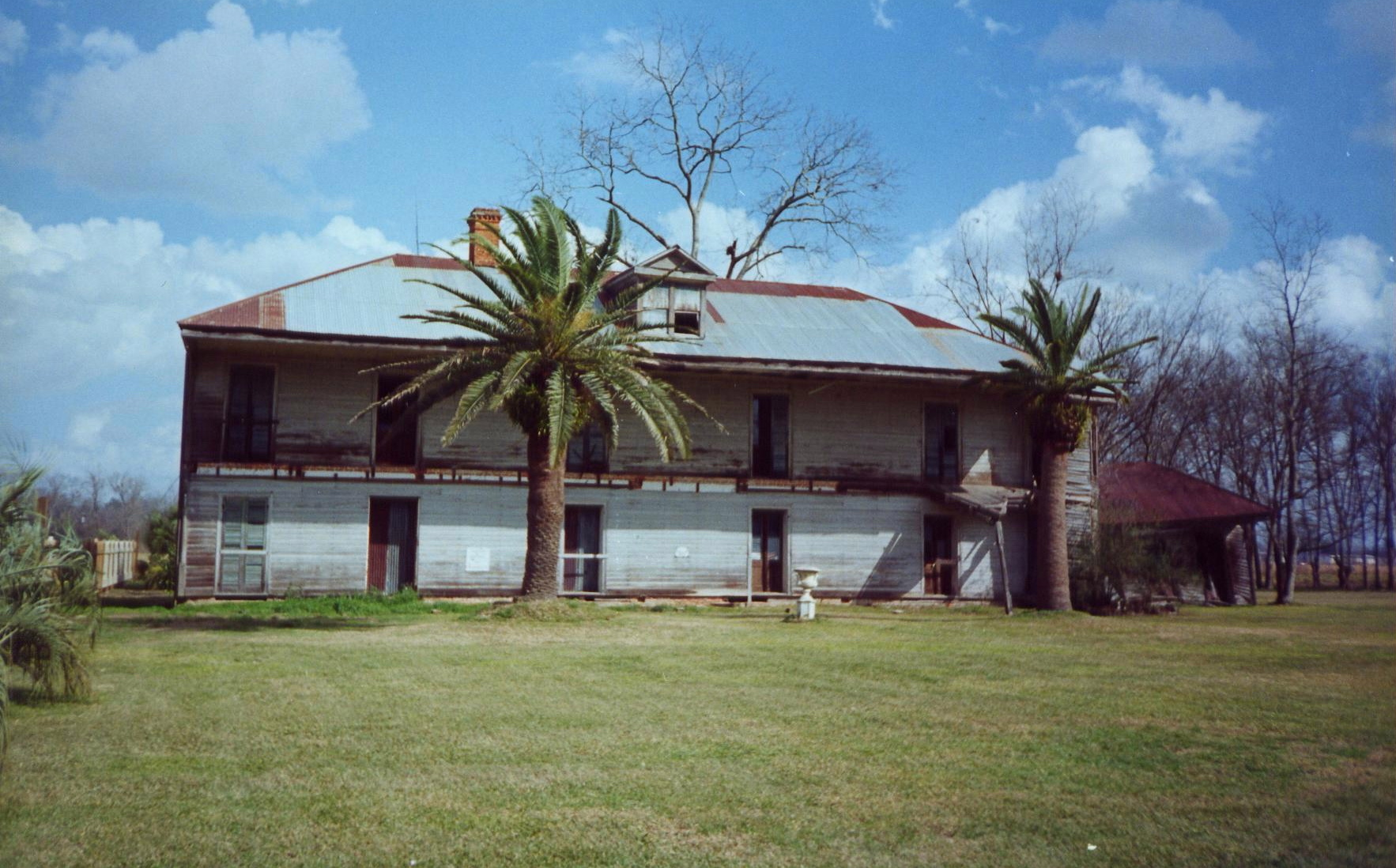
Maison de Reprise, remains of the retirement home built 500 feet away from the "big house." It was built for the first female president of the Duparc Plantation, Nannette Prud'homme Duparc.

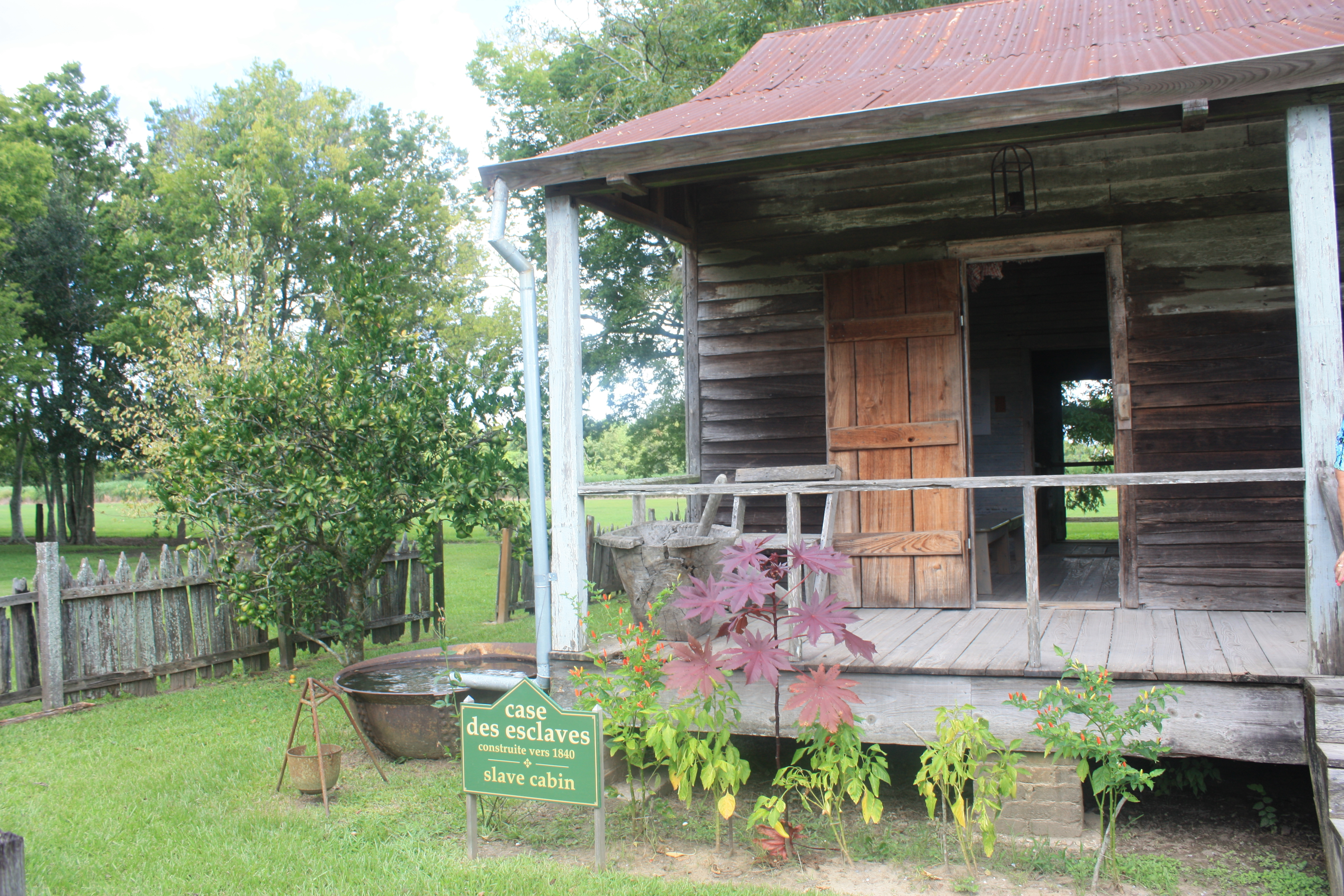
A slave cabin

In 1804, the Frenchman Guillaume Duparc, a naval veteran from the American Revolutionary War, had petitioned then-President Thomas Jefferson, for land. Jefferson secured Duparc's loyalty to the U.S., which had just acquired additional territory through the Louisiana Purchase, by granting him land along the Mississippi River. Considering the natives to be Frenchmen, the French did not force them off the riverlands. Instead, the Colapissa continued to live on the rear part of the plantation until 1915.

Duparc's enslaved population built his plantation house during 1804 and 1805. The house had a U-shape, with the two back wings around a central courtyard. A detached kitchen building in the back, separate to protect the main house from fire and keep it cooler in summer. The Duparc family acquired adjacent parcels of land, and expanded the sugarcane plantation to more than 12,000 acres (5,000 ha) of real estate. The plantation size, wings of the manor house, and outbuildings have changed over the years since the original plantation house completed in 1805.

The sugar mill was located about 1 mile (1.6 km) behind the big house, surrounded by sugarcane fields. A longer dirt road extended behind the house for 3.5 miles (6 km), which was lined with the slave cabins to house the enslaved workers.

In the years before the American Civil War, the slave quarters included a slave infirmary, approximately 69 cabins, communal kitchens, and several water wells located along the road. Each slave cabin was occupied by two families, who had separate doors and shared a central double fireplace. Near each cabin they kept a vegetable garden plus a chicken coop and/or pigpen. By the time of the Civil War, there were 186 slaves working the farm. The DuParc Plantation exported commodity crops of indigo, rice, pecans, and sugar cane.

The first owner, Guillaume Duparc, lived at the plantation for 4 years, dying in 1808, 3 years after the house was completed. His daughter Elisabeth in 1821 married George Raymond Locoul, a native of Bordeaux, France, and the Locoul family continued to own the house in subsequent generations.

Generations later, Laura Locoul Gore, who was born in the big house in 1861, inherited the plantation. (Her memoir was published posthumously in 2000.) She ran the plantation as a sugar cane business until 1891, the year before her marriage.

=== Waguespack family ===
Locoul Gore sold the plantation in 1891 to Aubert Florian Waguespack. The Waguespack family ran, resided on, and lived at the plantation for nearly another century, until 1984.

The complex continued operating as a plantation into the 20th century. The two back wings of the manor house were removed, widening the back balcony, and a back kitchen wing was added off the back porch.

=== Later history ===
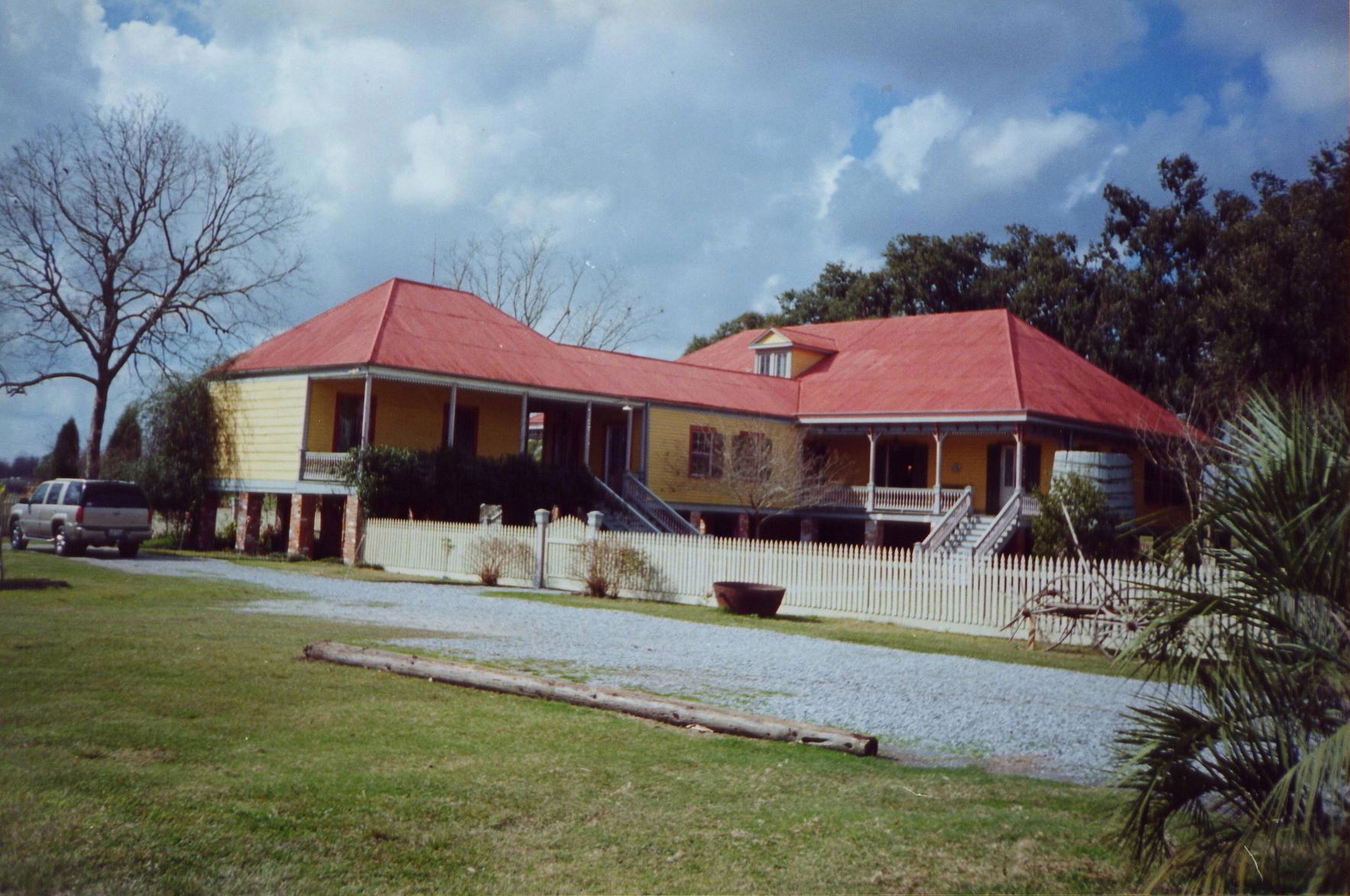
Back of house, showing kitchen wing (in 2002), which burned in the fire of 2004.

On August 9, 2004, the plantation house was significantly damaged by an electrical fire which destroyed 80% of the house, including the kitchen wing behind the house. The left half of the house survived, but even the elevated foundation of the right side was burned. Restoration work was completed in 2006, despite the interruption of Hurricane Katrina in August 2005. The ashes of the kitchen wing were cleared, but the back wing was not rebuilt. Instead, the back corners of the house were capped with old gray boards to indicate where two back wings of the house had existed when Laura Locoul, the last DuParc descendant, sold the plantation in 1891.

== Br'er Rabbit connection ==
The Br'er Rabbit and Br'er Fox tales recounted in Louisiana and the South are variations on traditional stories that originated in Senegal and were brought by enslaved Senegalese to America around the 1720s as part of their culture. According to the plantation's history, Alcée Fortier, a neighbor of the family and student of folklore, visited there in the 1870s to listen to the freedmen. He collected the stories, which freedmen told their children in the Louisiana Creole language that had developed since colonial times. It was a creole language based in French and absorbing African languages. These stories were about Compair Lapin and Compair Bouki (the clever rabbit and stupid fool), in which the rabbit plays a traditional trickster role. Twenty-five years later in 1894, Fortier published stories which he had collected and translated in the edition Louisiana Folk Tales: In French Dialect and English Translation. Fortier may have collected some of the tales at Laura Plantation and his own family's plantation.

In the late 20th century, Laura Plantation's association with Fortier's Br'er Rabbit tales drew the attention of preservationist Norman Marmillion. He created a for-profit company to attract enough investors to embark on a ten-year plan of restoration of the plantation. Some investors are descendants of former owners.

== See also ==
- Whitney Plantation
- Rural African American Museum, Opelousas
- List of plantations in Louisiana
- National Register of Historic Places listings in St. James Parish, Louisiana
