= Alcée Fortier =

American philologist and folklorist

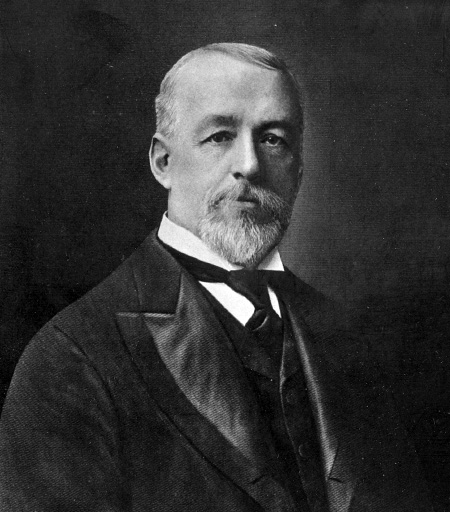
- Alcée Fortier, c. 1900s
- Born: June 5, 1856; Saint James Refinery, St. James Parish, Louisiana, U.S.
- Died: February 14, 1914 (aged 57); New Orleans, Louisiana, U.S.
- Resting place: Saint Louis Cemetery No. 2, New Orleans
- Occupations: Professor, scholar
- Years active: 1880–1914
- Known for: Linguistics, folklore, history
- Spouse: Marie Lanauze
- Parents: Florent-Louis Fortier (father); Marie-Edwige Aime (mother)

Alcée Fortier (June 5, 1856 – February 14, 1914) was a renowned Professor of Romance Languages at Tulane University in New Orleans. In the late 19th and early 20th century, he published numerous works on language, literature, Louisiana history and folklore, Louisiana Creole languages, and personal reminiscence. He had French Creole ancestry dating to the colonial period.

He became president of the Modern Language Association and the Louisiana Historical Society, was appointed to the State Board of Education, and was active in the American Folklore Society and the New Orleans Academy of Sciences.

== Early life and education ==
Fortier was born in St. James Parish, on Petit Versailles Plantation, which was owned by his maternal grandfather Valcour Aime and had long been cultivated for sugar cane. Alcée Fortier was the son of Florent-Louis Fortier and Marie-Edwige Aime. His father and grandfathers were sugar cane planters of French Creole ancestry. The Fortier family had been in the Louisiana territory since the early 18th century, when it was a French colony. The families were prominent in the social and political life of the parish and the state.

Fortier was a child when the American Civil War broke out. His family suffered a loss in fortune following the war, losing the property value of their slaves and struggling to adapt to a free labor market in a period of agricultural decline. Fortier completed classes at the classical school of A.V. Romain in New Orleans and entered the University of Virginia. Serious illness prevented him from completing his studies there. Fortier returned to New Orleans and read law, then started working as a clerk.

== Career ==
Fortier taught French in the city high school for a time. He was hired as principal in the preparatory department of the University of Louisiana.

In 1880 Fortier was elected professor of French in the University of Louisiana. He was reelected when it became Tulane University. He worked as a Professor of Romance Languages there his entire career. In addition to teaching European languages, he expanded his studies to include Louisiana Creole, Acadian French, and the Louisiana folklore of Acadians and African-American freedmen.

Fortier was a prolific author, publishing a range of studies on the French literature of Louisiana and France; dialect studies of Louisiana Creoles, Acadians and Isleños; and Louisiana Creole folk tales translated into English. In 1903 he published a four-volume history of Louisiana that was well reviewed by the New York Times. He was a contributor to the Catholic Encyclopedia.

He was also active in a range of new local, state, and national professional organizations. He was president of the Louisiana Historical Society (founded 1835) and the national Modern Language Association (founded 1883). He was appointed to the State Board of Education. In addition, he was active in the New Orleans Academy of Sciences (founded 1859) and American Folklore Society (founded 1888).

== Marriage and family ==
On October 22, 1881, Fortier married Marie Lanauze, daughter of Adolphe Lanauze and Augustine Henriette Feraud. They had eight children. Her father Adolphe Lanauze was a native of France who had immigrated to New Orleans. He was a hardware merchant and the first commercial tenant in the Pontalba Buildings. Today, his former shop houses the 1850 Museum gift shop.

Alcée Fortier died at his home in New Orleans on February 14, 1914.

== Works ==
Books

- Sept grands auteurs du dix-neuvième siècle, 1899.
- Histoire de la Littérature Française
- Louisiana Folk Tales: In French Dialect and English Translation, 1895.
- Louisiana Studies: Literature, Customs and Dialects, History and Education, New Orleans: F.F. Hansell & Bro., 1894.
- A History of Louisiana, New York: Manzi, Joyant & Co., 1904.
- Louisiana; Comprising Sketches of Counties, Towns, Events, Institutions, and Persons. Atlanta: Southern Historical Association, 1909.
- The Louisiana Sugar Planters of the Old Regime. New Orleans, 1914.

Papers presented to the Modern Language Association:

- "The French Language in Louisiana and the Negro-French Dialect"
- "The French Literature of Louisiana"
- "Bits of Louisiana Folk Lore", 1887
- "The Acadians of Louisiana and Their Dialect"
- "The Yalinos [Isleños] of Louisiana and Their Dialect"

== Legacy and honors ==
Fortier was significant in the study of French language and literature in Louisiana and the United States, as well as the study of Louisiana Creole dialects - he did work in Louisiana Creole, Cajun and Isleño forms.

His name is remembered in New Orleans:

- Alcée Fortier Hall, Tulane University
- Alcée Fortier High School
- Alcée Fortier Street, in New Orleans East
- Alcée Fortier Park at Esplanade Avenue and Mystery Street
