= St. Joseph Plantation =

Historic house in Louisiana, United States

- St. Joseph Plantation House
- U.S. National Register of Historic Places
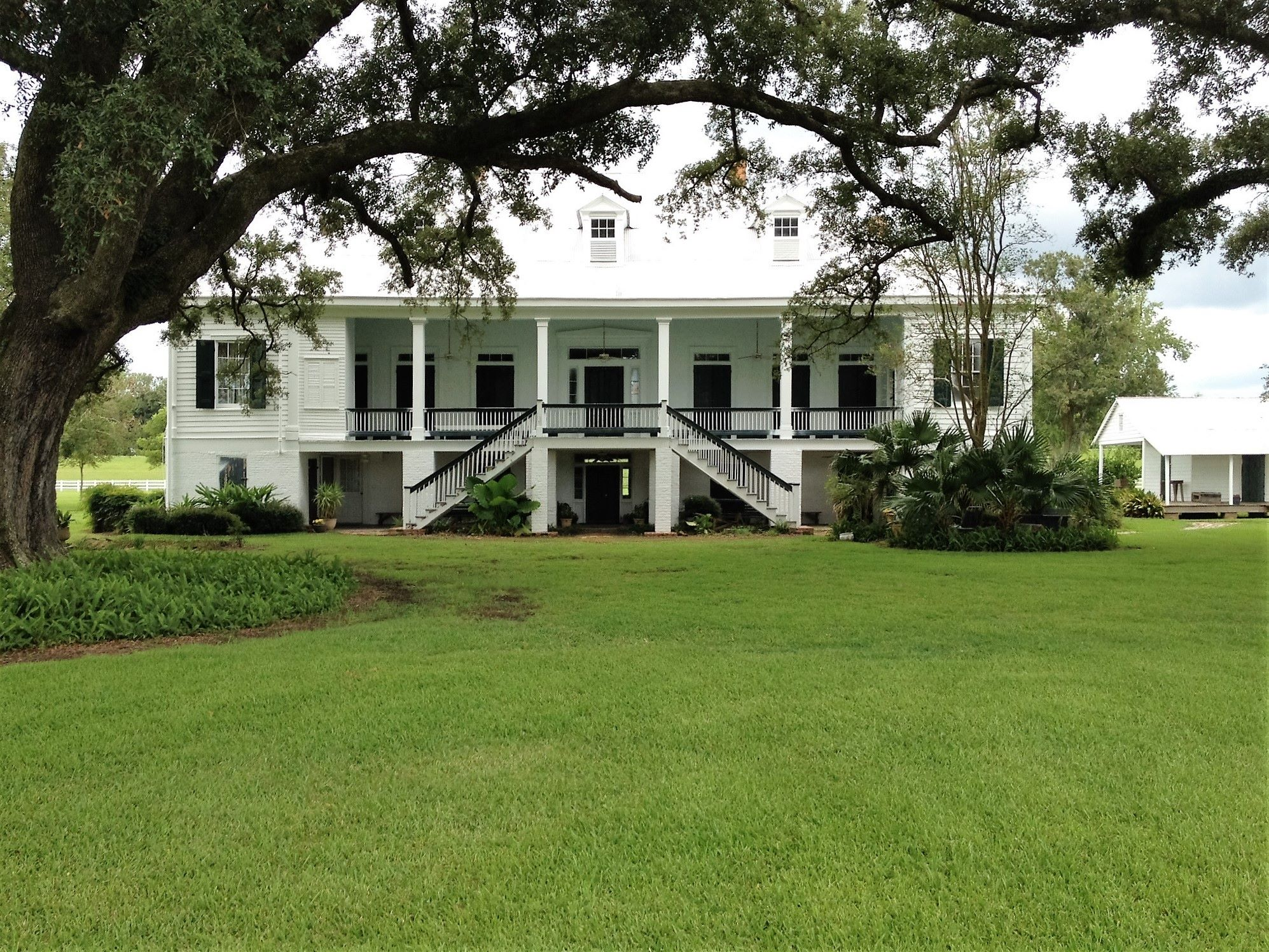
- St. Joseph Plantation House in 2020

- Location within Louisiana
- Nearest city: Vacherie, Louisiana
- Coordinates: 30°0′21.5″N 90°46′20.1″W
- Built: 1840
- Architectural style: Greek Revival
- MPS: Louisiana's French Creole Architecture MPS
- NRHP reference No.: 05000987
- Added to NRHP: September 6, 2005

St. Joseph Plantation is a historic plantation located on the west bank of the Mississippi River in the town of Vacherie, Louisiana, United States. It is listed on the National Register of Historic Places.

St. Joseph Plantation is located at 3535 Hwy 18 Vacherie, LA 70090, adjacent to Oak Alley Plantation and up-river from Laura Plantation. The plantation was first owned by Josephine Aime Ferry in 1830, but the Ferry family sold it to Joseph Waguespack (1802-1892) in 1877 (Waguespack's son, Aubert Florian, owned Laura Plantation). In 1890 Saturnine Waguespack merged St. Joseph Plantation with Felicity Plantation to form the St. Joseph Plantation and Manufacturing Company. It is today maintained by descendants of the Waguespack and Simon families.

== See also ==
- List of plantations in Louisiana
- National Register of Historic Places listings in St. James Parish, Louisiana
