= Convent, Louisiana =

- Census-designated place
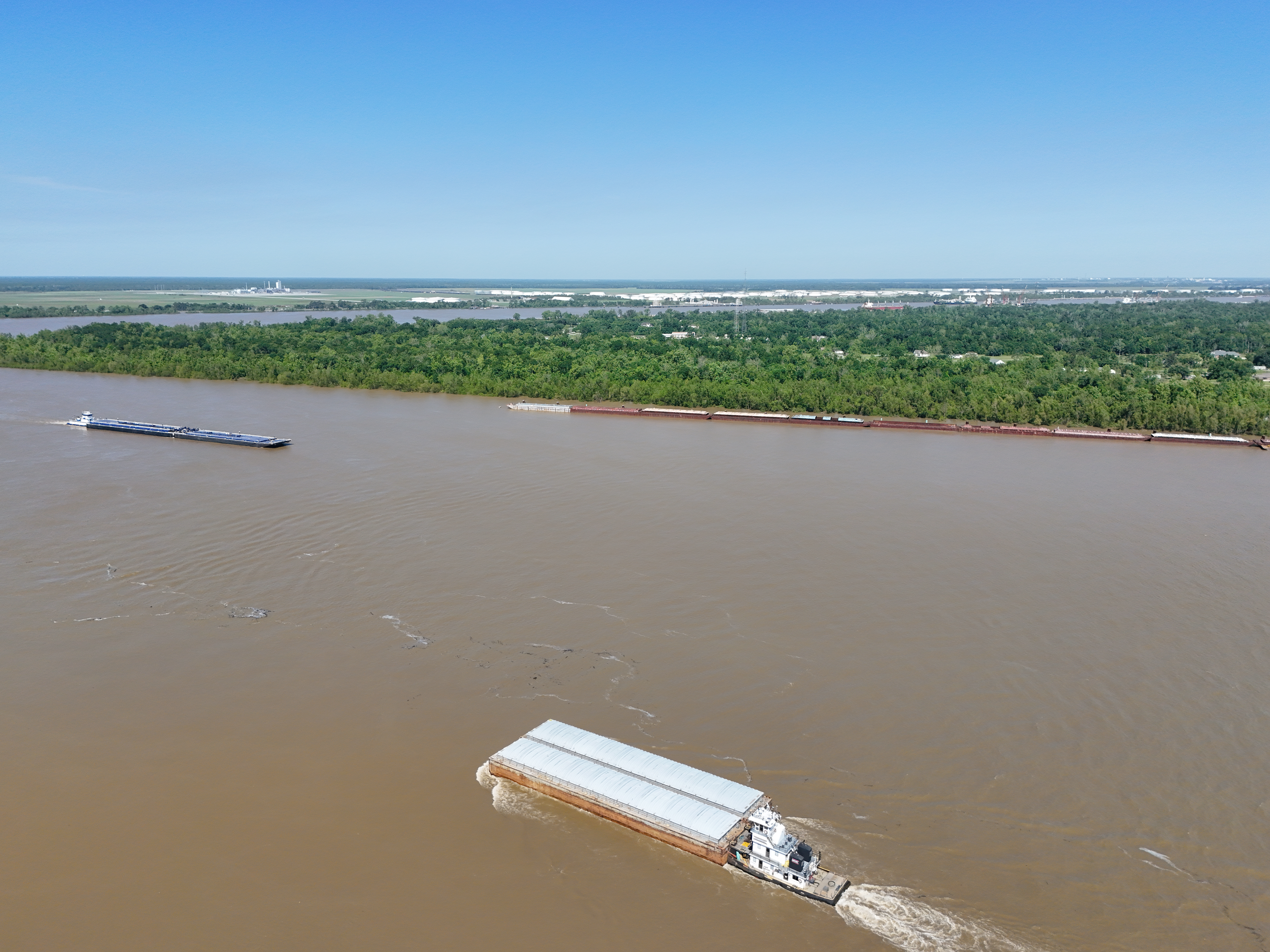
- Barges in the Mississippi River near Convent

- Location of Convent in Louisiana
- Coordinates: 30°01′15″N 90°49′47″W
- Country: United States
- State: Louisiana
- Parish: St. James

Area
  - Total: 5.33 sq mi (13.81 km^{2})
  - Land: 3.89 sq mi (10.07 km^{2})
  - Water: 1.44 sq mi (3.74 km^{2})
- Elevation: 10 ft (3.0 m)

Population (2020)
  - Total: 483
  - Density: 124.2/sq mi (47.97/km^{2})
- Time zone: UTC-6 (CST)
  - Summer (DST): UTC-5 (CDT)
- ZIP Code: 70723
- Area code: 225
- FIPS code: 22-17180
- GNIS feature ID: 2583534

Convent (French: Couvent) is a census-designated place in and the parish seat of St. James Parish, Louisiana, United States. It has been the parish seat since 1869. It is part of the New Orleans metropolitan area.

As of the 2020 census, Convent had a population of 483. The 2018 median household income was $52,292 above the state's average.

== History ==
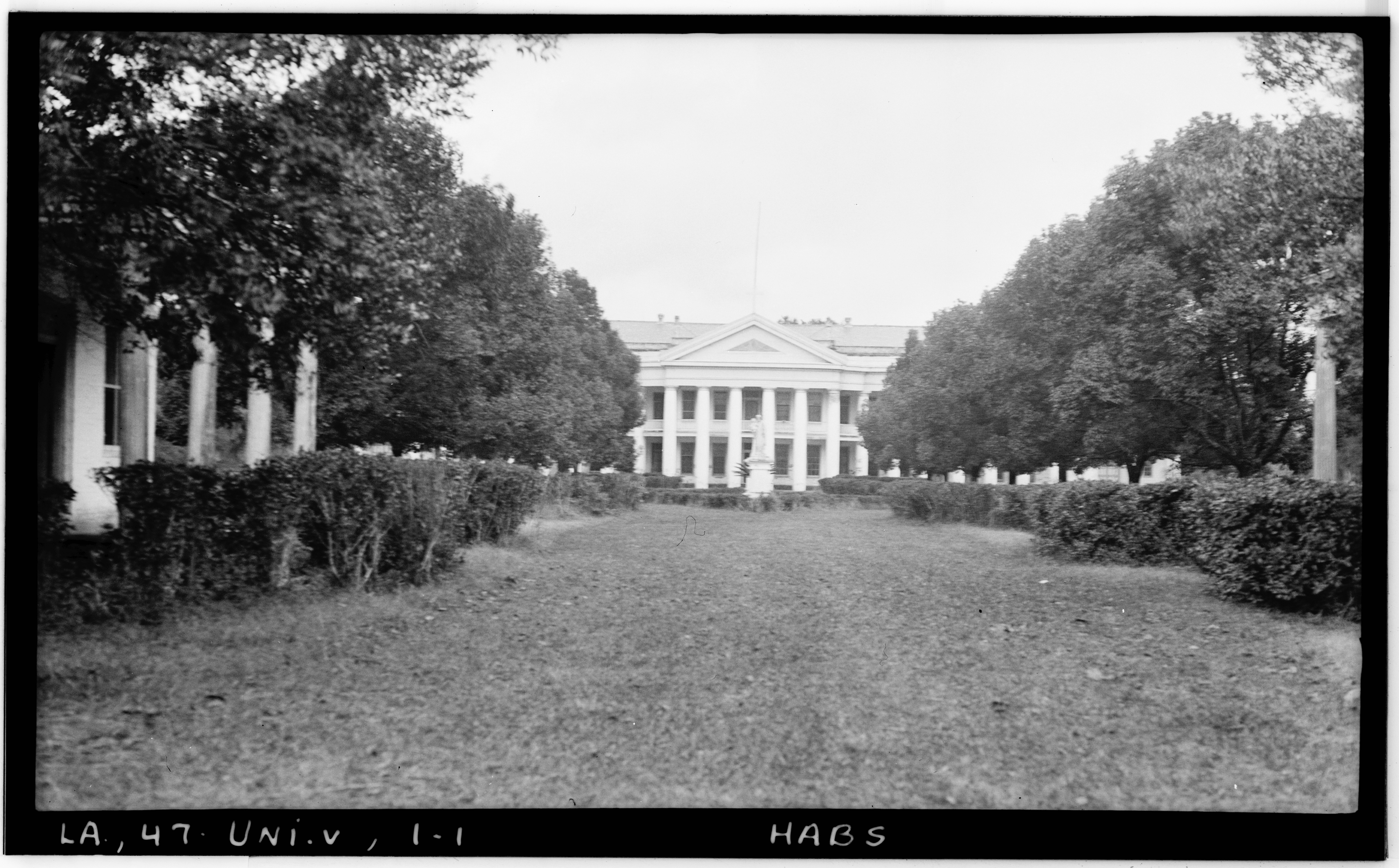
Manresa House of Retreats (formerly Jefferson College) in 1934

The area now known as Convent was originally settled between 1722 and 1739 and called Baron. The town’s name derives from the Convent of the Sacred Heart, established in 1825 by the Religious of the Sacred Heart, who operated a girls’ school until 1932.

St. Michael Parish, founded in 1809, is among the oldest Catholic parishes in Louisiana. The present church, built in 1833 and enlarged in the 1870s, features Romanesque and Gothic architectural elements and includes a Lourdes Grotto constructed in 1876. The church and its associated historic district are listed on the National Register of Historic Places.

Jefferson College, chartered in 1831 and opened in 1834, operated under several names before closing in 1928. The campus was occupied by Union troops during the Civil War and later donated to the Marist Fathers. In 1931, it became the Manresa House of Retreats, a Jesuit retreat center that remains active today. The main building, rebuilt after an 1842 fire, is an example of Greek Revival architecture.

The community’s history is closely tied to sugar plantation culture, and records indicate that both the convent and college relied on enslaved labor during the antebellum period.

On February 23, 2016, an EF-3 tornado struck the area, causing severe damage at the Sugar Hill RV Park, killing two people and injuring dozens.

== Geography ==
Convent is located on the east bank of the Mississippi River in St. James Parish, Louisiana, at 30°01′15″N 90°49′47″W. The census-designated place covers 5.33 square miles (13.8 km^{2}), of which 3.89 square miles (10.1 km^{2}) is land and 1.44 square miles (3.7 km^{2}) is water. Its average elevation is about 16 feet (4.9 m) above sea level.

Convent lies approximately 35 miles (56 km) west of New Orleans and 35 miles (56 km) southeast of Baton Rouge, accessible via Louisiana Highway 44 and Louisiana Highway 3125. The area has a humid subtropical climate, typical of southern Louisiana.

== Demographics ==
Historical population
Census	Pop.	Note	%±
2010	711		—
2020	483		−32.1%
U.S. Decennial Census; 2010 2020

Convent first appeared as a census designated place in the 2010 U.S. census.

Convent CDP, Louisiana – Racial and ethnic composition Note: the U.S. Census Bureau treats Hispanic/Latino as an ethnic category. This table excludes Latinos from the racial categories and assigns them to a separate category. Hispanics/Latinos may be of any race.
Race / Ethnicity (NH = Non-Hispanic)	Pop 2010	Pop 2020	% 2010	% 2020
White alone (NH)	226	203	31.79%	42.03%
Black or African American alone (NH)	467	255	65.68%	52.80%
Native American or Alaska Native alone (NH)	0	0	0.00%	0.00%
Asian alone (NH)	1	2	0.14%	0.41%
Native Hawaiian or Pacific Islander alone (NH)	0	0	0.00%	0.00%
Other race alone (NH)	2	0	0.28%	0.00%
Mixed race or Multiracial (NH)	6	6	0.84%	1.24%
Hispanic or Latino (any race)	9	17	1.27%	3.52%
Total	711	483	100.00%	100.00%

At the 2010 census, it had a population of 711; in 2020, its population declined to 483.

== Industry ==
Convent’s economy has historically centered on petrochemical and heavy industry along the Mississippi River. The most notable facility was the Shell Convent Refinery, which processed up to 239,000 barrels per day of crude oil and employed over 1,000 workers. In 2020, Shell permanently closed the refinery after failing to find a buyer, citing market conditions and its shift toward renewable energy.

Shell plans to repurpose the 4,400-acre site into a renewable fuels complex producing sustainable aviation fuel and renewable diesel, with construction targeted for 2025–2028. Other major employers include Nucor Steel Louisiana, Occidental Chemical, and cement producers such as Holcim, supporting the region’s petrochemical and construction sectors.

== Notable person ==
- Jarvis Landry is an American football wide receiver and return specialist for the New Orleans Saints of the National Football League. He also played college football at LSU.
- Pete Herman was a World Bantamweight Champion boxer (1917–1921), born in Convent, Louisiana.
