= Vacherie, Louisiana =

Vacherie
- Unincorporated community
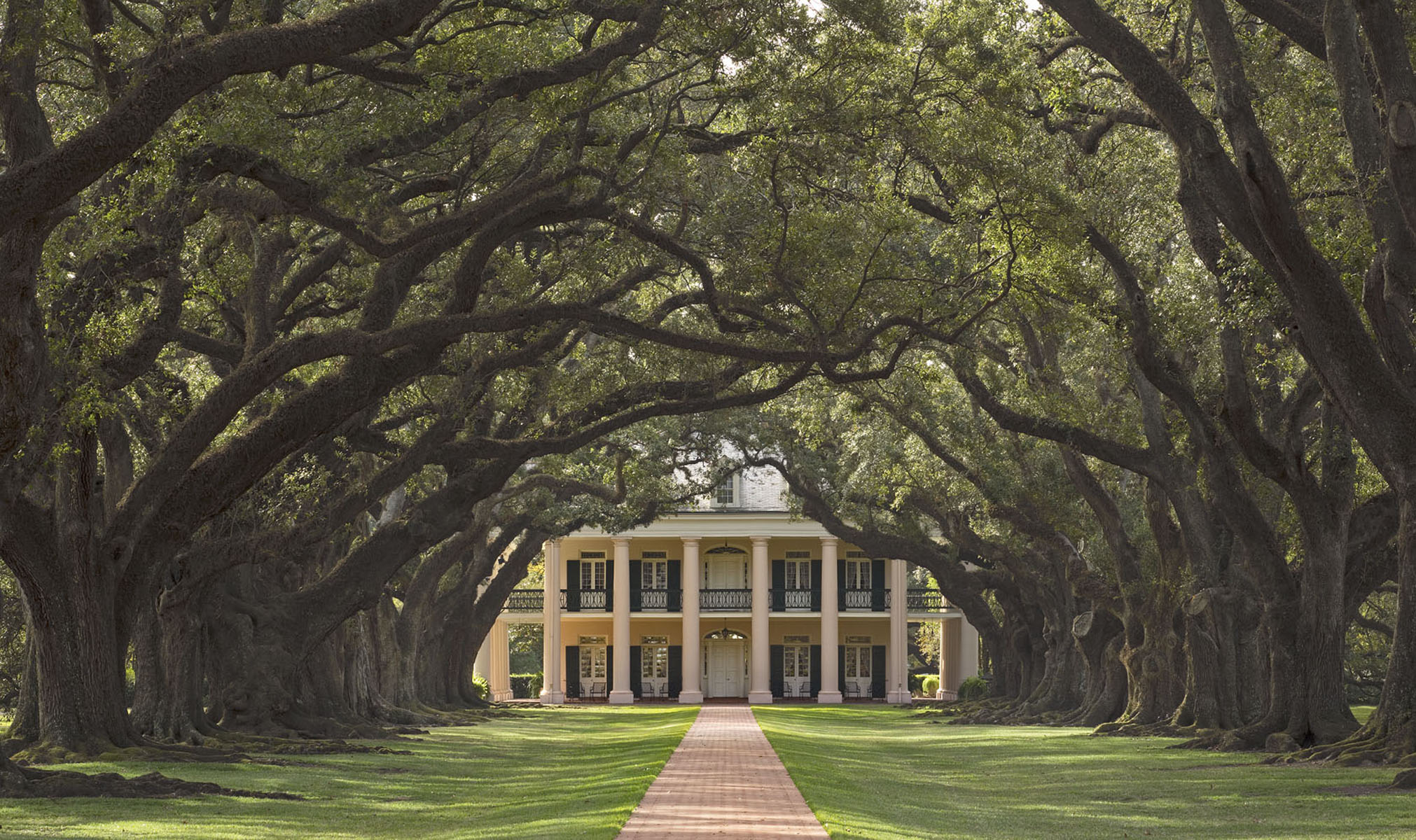
- The Oak Alley Plantation house, built in 1839

- Location of Vacherie in Louisiana
- Coordinates: 30°00′40″N 90°43′10″W
- Country: United States
- State: Louisiana
- Parish: St. James
- Elevation: 16 ft (4.9 m)

Population (2020)
  - Total: 5,481
- Time zone: UTC-6 (CST)
  - Summer (DST): UTC-5 (CDT)
- Area code: 225

Vacherie is an unincorporated community in St. James Parish, Louisiana, United States. It is part of the New Orleans Metropolitan Area. The name of the place derives from the French word for cowshed. On the SW side of the community used to be the 1,969 ft (600 m) WZRH/KVDU-Tower, a guyed mast noted as the tallest tower in the state of Louisiana. It fell in 2021 after being damaged by Hurricane Ida.

The best known location in the community is the Oak Alley Plantation. There are several other historic plantations in the area: Laura, Desire, St. Joseph, and Felicity. The last two were combined in 1890.

Vacherie was used as a filming location for the TV series True Detective.

== Census-designated places ==
Vacherie is split into two census-designated places, North Vacherie and South Vacherie, by the United States Census Bureau. As of the 2020 census, North Vacherie had a population of 2,093 and South Vacherie had a population of 3,388.

== Education ==
St. James Parish Public Schools operates public schools. St. James High School is located in Vacherie. Vacherie Elementary School in South Vacherie serves the community.

== Notable people ==
- Valcour Aime, planter and plantation owner
- Alcée Fortier, philologist and folklorist
- George T. Oubre, state senator
- H. H. Richardson, architect
- Corey Webster, football player for the New York Giants
- Alfred C. Williams, state representative for East Baton Rouge Parish
